= Miodrag Rajičić =

Miodrag Rajičić (Serbian Cyrillic: Миодраг Рајичић; February 14, 1898—November 23, 1977) was a Yugoslav Serbian historian. He was an editor for the Sveznanje Encyclopaedia.

== Life ==
=== Early life ===
He was born on February 14, 1898, in Veliko Gradište, Kingdom of Serbia (today's Serbia). He attended school in his hometown and then in Smederevo and Požarevac, while his final classes and matura were in the Serb gymnasium in Nice, France. He studied at the philosophical faculties of the universities of Auvergne (Clermont-Ferrand), and Paris, while he graduated at the Philosophical Faculty in Belgrade in 1922.

=== Professor ===
Miodrag Rajičić became a professor in 1929. He worked as an official in the Ministry of Finance from 1920, then he was a temporary teacher in Aleksinac, Šabac, Novi Pazar, Dubrovnik, Kragujevac and Kavadar. He taught at the State Trade Academy, which became the First Economical School in Belgrade from 1928 until his retirement in 1958.

He wrote several books on history and geography for high school, and translated French works, and was an editor for the Sveznanje (Omniscience) Encyclopaedia. Of his acclaimed historiographical work are the discussions on the topic of Medieval Serbian history, notably Osnovno jezgro države Dejanovića (1952) and Sevastokrator Dejan (1953), which are about the Serbian magnate Dejan who served Emperor Stefan Dušan (r. 1331–55) as despot, and Emperor Uroš V (r. 1355–71) as sevastokrator, and was the progenitor of the Dejanović noble family, with his two sons, despot Jovan and gospodin Konstantin becoming powerful in the fall of the Serbian Empire. He was one of the authors of Memorandum of the First Economical School in Belgrade (1956).

== Death ==
He died on November 23, 1977, in Belgrade.

== Work ==
- Osnovno jezgro države Dejanovića, 1952
- Sevastokrator Dejan, 1953
- Istorija
- Domina Despina
