= Dejanović noble family =

Serbian noble family

Dejanović Дејановић Dragaš Драгаш
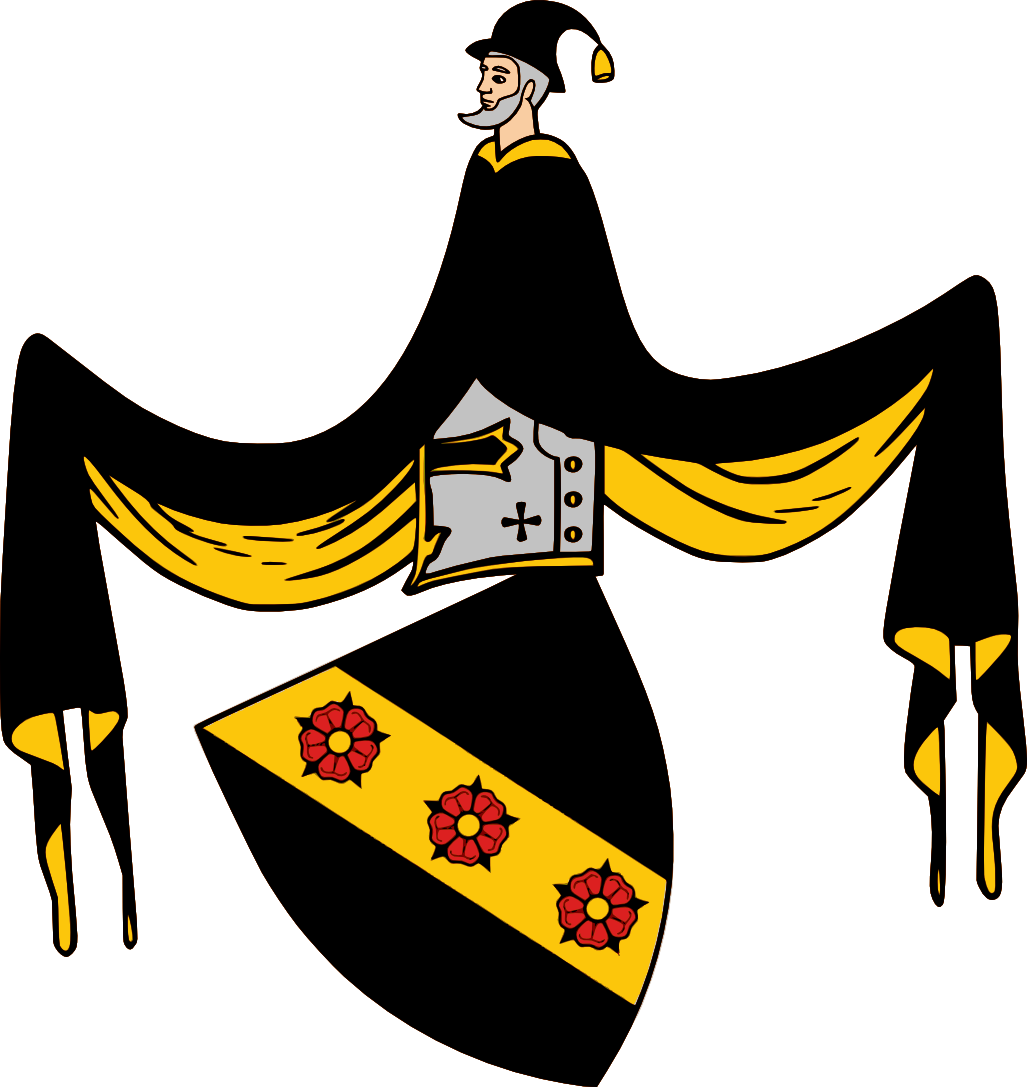
- Country: Kingdom of Serbia (medieval); Serbian Empire (until 1371); Ottoman Empire (1373–95)
- Founded: 1346
- Founder: Dejan
- Final ruler: Konstantin
- Titles: gospodin sevastokrator despot
- Estates: župe (counties) of Žegligovo and Preševo (1355)
- Dissolution: 1395

The House of Dejanović (Serbian Cyrillic: Дејановић, pl. Dejanovići / Дејановићи) or House of Dragaš (Serbian Cyrillic: Драгаш, pl. Dragaši / Драгаши) originates from a medieval noble family that served the Serbian Empire of Dušan the Mighty (r. 1331–1355) and Uroš the Weak (r. 1355–1371), and during the fall of the Serbian Empire, after the Battle of Maritsa (1371), it became an Ottoman vassal. The family was one of the most prominent during these periods. The Dejanović/Dragaš held a region roughly centered where the borders of Serbia, Bulgaria and North Macedonia meet. The last two Byzantine Emperors were maternal descendants of this house.

The progenitor, sevastokrator Dejan, was a magnate in the service of Emperor Dušan, and also the Emperor's brother-in-law through his marriage with Teodora-Evdokija. Dejan held the župe (counties) of Žegligovo and Preševo under Dušan, and later received the title of despot during the rule of Dušan's son, Emperor Uroš V, when he was appointed the administration Upper Struma with Velbužd, after the death of powerful despot Jovan Oliver. After Dejan's death between 1358 and 1365, most of his province was given to Vlatko Paskačić, besides the initial counties of Žegligovo and Preševo, which were left to his two sons, Jovan and Konstantin. The brothers, who ruled jointly, managed to double the extent of their province during the Fall of the Serbian Empire following Emperor Uroš V's death, chiefly to the south; the lands now covered from Vranje and Preševo to Radomir, in the south to Štip, Radovište and Strumica. In 1373, two years after the devastating Battle of Maritsa, the brothers became vassals to the Ottoman Empire. After the death of Jovan in 1377, Konstantin continued to rule under Ottoman overlordship. Konstantin and his provincial neighbour and fellow Ottoman vassal, Prince Marko, fell at the Battle of Rovine in 1395.

The Dejanović family built and reconstructed several churches and monasteries throughout their province. Some of these include the Zemen Monastery and Arhiljevica Church, built by Dejan, and the Poganovo Monastery and Osogovo Monastery, built by Konstantin.

Konstantin had married his daughter Jelena to the Byzantine Emperor Manuel II Palaiologos (r. 1391–1425), from which the last Byzantine Emperors John VIII (r. 1425–1448) and Constantine XI (r. 1449–1453) sprung. Constantine XI, who died defending Constantinople from the Ottomans in 1453, was known by his mother's surname, in Greek, Dragases (Δραγάσης, tr. Dragáses).

== History ==
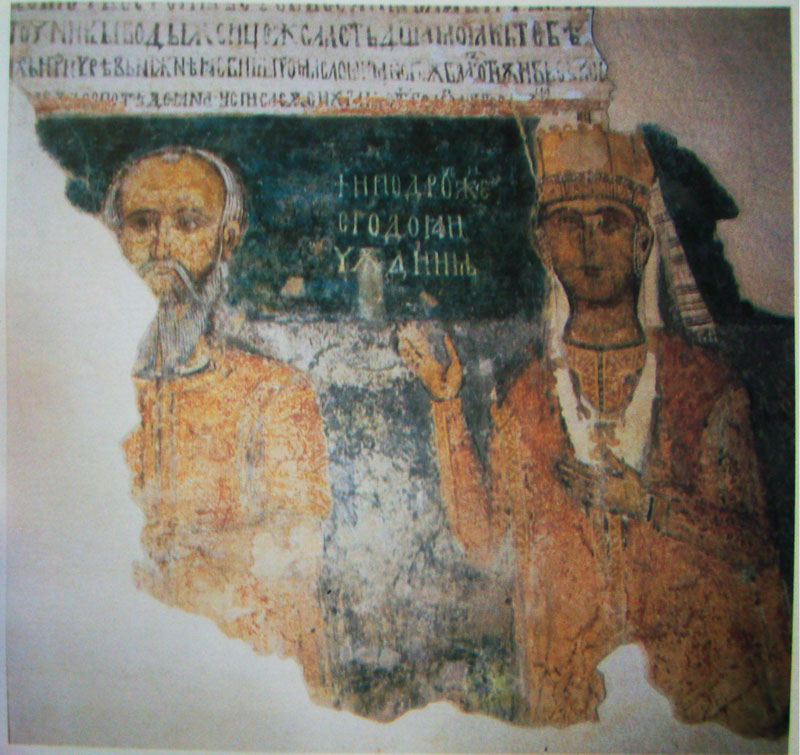
Despot Dejan and his wife, fresco from the Zemen Monastery.

The family's progenitor was Dejan, a Serbian vojvoda (military commander and lord) in the Kumanovo region, who married Teodora, the sister of Stefan Dušan. Dejan became sevastokrator in 1346. His origin is unknown. Earlier scholars believed that the Dejanović were relatives of Jovan Oliver, although this is no longer accepted (Fine 1994). K. Jirechek suggested that he was vojvoda Dejan Manjak.

On April 16, 1346 (Easter), Stefan Dušan convoked a huge assembly at Skopje, where the autocephalous Serbian Archbishopric was raised to the status of a Patriarchate. The new Patriarch Joanikije II now solemnly crowned Dušan as "Emperor (basileus) and autocrat of Serbs and Romans (Greeks)". Dušan had his son Uroš V crowned King of Serbs and Greeks, giving him nominal rule over the Serbian lands, and although Dušan was governing the whole state, he had special responsibility for the "Roman", i.e. Greek lands. A further increase in the Byzantinization of the Serbian court followed, particularly in court ceremonial and titles. In the years that followed, the Serbian nobility were elevated: Dušan's half-brother Simeon Uroš, brother-in-law Jovan Asen and Jovan Oliver were granted the title of despot. His brother-in-law Dejan and Branko were granted the title of sevastokrator. The military commanders (voivodes) Preljub, Vojihna and Grgur received the title of ćesar. The raising of the Serbian Patriarchate resulted in the same spirit - bishops became metropolitans.

He is mentioned in 1354. According to Stefan Dušan's charter to the monastery of Arhiljevica (August 1355), sevastokrator Dejan, whom he called his brother ("брат царства ми севастократор Дејан") possessed a large province east of Skopska Crna Gora. It included the old župe (counties) of Žegligovo and Preševo (modern Kumanovo region with Sredorek, Kozjačija and the larger part of Pčinja). Based on the charter, Arhiljevica was situated where the granted villages (metochion) of Podlešane, Izvor and Rućinci (Kumanovska Crna Gora) lay, in the slopes of Jezer. The fact that Dejan built Arhiljevica rather than renovate it is evidence of his economical strength. Dušan also granted a church, metochion, and two villages in the region on his own behalf.

Dejan was one of the prominent figures of Dušan's reign and during the fall of the Serbian Empire after Dušan's death. Under Emperor Dušan, despot Jovan Oliver, with his brother Bogdan and sevastokrator Dejan, ruled over all of eastern Macedonia. He is not mentioned much in Dušan's military endeavors, although the reputation of him and his successors suggest that he was involved in most of Dušan's successes. His prominence beyond Serbia is evident from the fact that Pope Innocent VI addressed Dejan in 1355, asking him to support the creation of the union between the Catholic Church and the Serbian Orthodox Church (such letters were sent to the highest nobility and the church).

Dejan received the title of despot sometime after August 1355, either from Emperor Dušan, who died on 20 December 1355, or his heir Uroš V, most likely under the latter. As despot under the rule of Uroš V, Dejan was entrusted with the administration of the territory between South Morava, Pčinja, Skopska Crna Gora (hereditary lands) and in the east, the Upper Struma river with Velbuzhd, a province notably larger than during Dušan's life. As the only despot, Dejan held the highest title in the Empire (this had earlier been Jovan Oliver).

Dejan's daughter Teodora was married to Žarko, the Lord of Lower Zeta ("gospodar donje Zete"), in 1356. Together they had a son, Mrkša (born 1363).

Until the death of knez Vojislav Vojinović in December 1363, the Serbian nobility in the Greek lands showed itself more ambitious, as it held more titles (despots Dejan and Vukašin, sevastokrator Vlatko, kesar Vojihna, etc.) and greater independence (deriving from their more extensive possessions, and therefore, wealth) in relation to the nobility of the old Serbian lands. While Vojislav lived, his influence secured the pre-eminence of the old Serbian nobility, but after his death Vukašin quickly gained a decisive influence on the Emperor. The nobility in the old Serbian lands was not at first alarmed at this, but Vukašin's ambition and his subsequent moves woke up the simmering antagonism between the two groups. It was not only Vukašin's endless ambition that paved the way to the top, as he had plenty of support from other nobles who benefited from him.

Jovan Oliver and Dejan died sometime before 1365, that is when Vukašin was elevated to King as co-ruler to Emperor Uroš V. Mandić believes that Dejan died in 1358, and that Vukašin (who until then was veliki vojvoda) took his place as despot, and that Jovan Uglješa became veliki vojvoda. It is unlikely that Dejan took monastic vows before his death, as his children were still young. His wife Teodora took monastic vows as Evdokija and lived in Strumica and Kyustendil, and she would until her death sign as "Empress", being entitled so as a female member of the dynasty.

After the death of Dejan, his province, besides the župe of Žegligovo and Upper Struma, was appropriated to nobleman Vlatko Paskačić. Vukašin Mrnjavčević, of whom there are no notable mentions until 1365, became more powerful (ultimately the most powerful in Macedonia) after the deaths of Vojislav, Dejan and despot Jovan Oliver (whose status in Macedonia was very high), as Vukašin's rise would have been unlikely during the lifetime of these. Vukašin's younger brother Jovan Uglješa is thought to have participated in the dismemberment of Dejan's province, as he used this chance to take the provinces which bordered on the oblast (province) of Ser (Serres), which he de facto held (Empress Jelena de jure). No one looked to the young sons of Dejan who would later become very important. Dejan's death brought benefit to Vukašin and Uglješa, not so much in territorial expansion (which is not so sure), but because Dejan's disappearance ended any stronger candidate to counter the Mrnjavčević family.

Jovan received the title of despot, like his father before, by Emperor Uroš. Most of Jovan Oliver's lands were later given to the brothers. It is not known why Jovan Oliver's sons did not inherit his lands; Serbian historian V. Ćorović considered turmoil and disorder the case, however not knowing the extent it developed to and what the consequences were. Earlier scholars believed that the Dejanović were relatives of Jovan Oliver, although this is no longer accepted (Fine 1994). The Dejanović brothers ruled a spacious province in eastern Macedonia, in the southern lands of the Empire, and remained loyal to Uroš V.

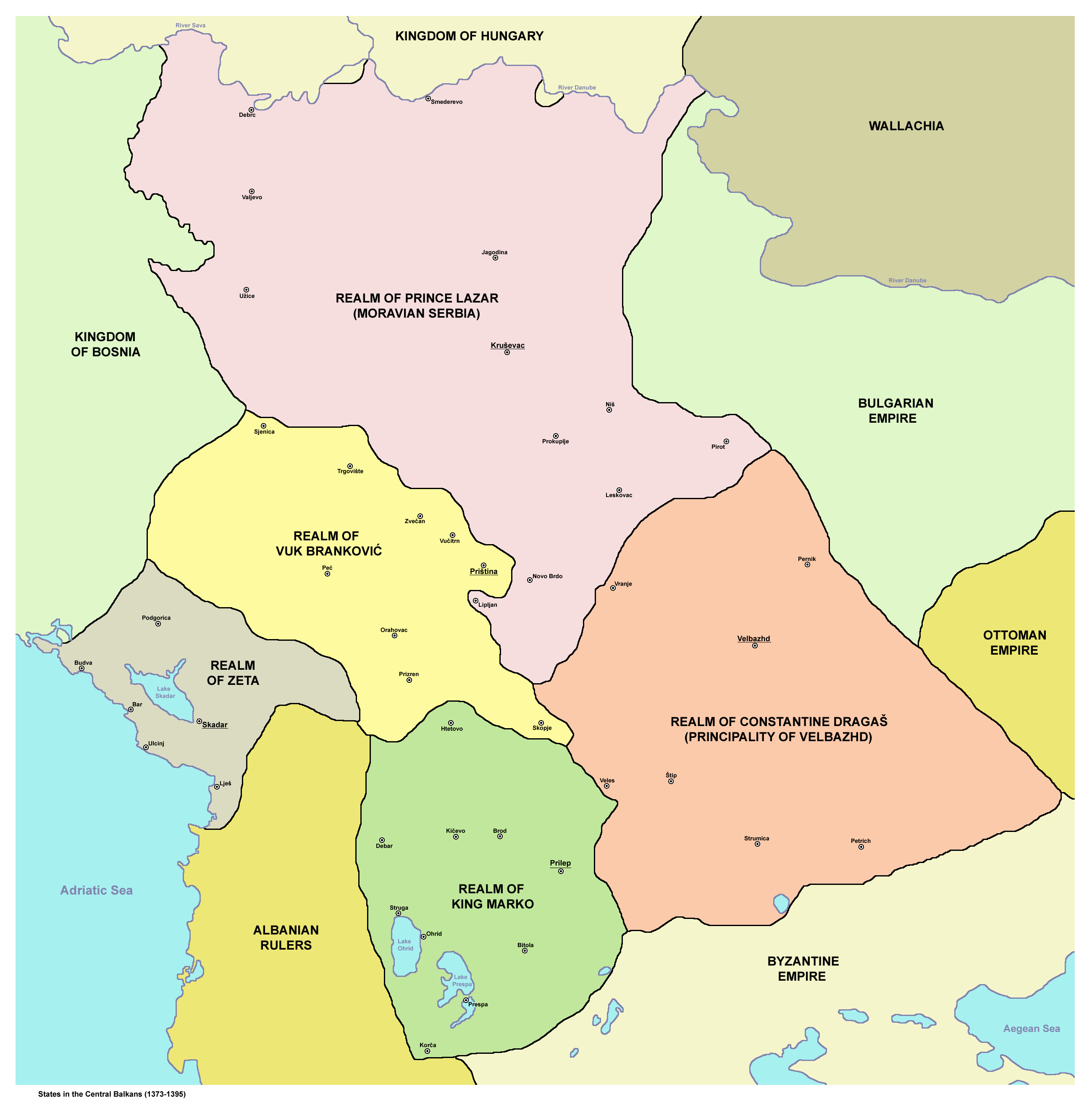
States that emerged in the fall of the Serbian Empire.

After the Ottoman victory at Maritsa (1371), the Ottomans did not immediately start with real conquests in the Balkans, but, reinforcing their positions, stopped to spread their influence and create grounds for further progress. They did not want to cause a persistent struggle from a Christian alliance until they were fully sure, so in the beginning they were satisfied with the Balkan magnate families recognizing their sovereignty and paying them tribute, in order to increase Ottoman financial resources. In that way they did not take Vukašin's province, but agreed to let his son and heir Marko rule in the Macedonia region, with the seat at Prilep (the foremost fortification of Pelagonia). In the north of Vukašin's province, Marko's younger brother Andrijaš held properties. Vukašin's successors fought with their western and northern Serbian neighbours, who after the death of Vukašin rushed to take over his possessions.

Emperor Uroš V died childless in December 2/4 1371, after much of the Serbian nobility had been destroyed in Maritsa earlier that year. This marked an end to the once powerful Empire. Vukašin's son Marko, who had earlier been crowned Young King was to inherit his father's royal title, and thus became one in the line of successors to the Serbian throne. Meanwhile, the nobles pursued their own interests, sometimes quarreling with each other. Serbia, without an Emperor "became a conglomerate of aristocratic territories", and the Empire was thus divided between the provincial lords: Marko, the Dejanović brothers, Đurađ I Balšić, Vuk Branković, Nikola Altomanović, Lazar Hrebeljanović. The Balšić family took Prizren, and Vuk Branković took Skoplje, from Marko.

In the new redistribution of feudal power, after 1371, the brothers despot Jovan and gospodin Konstantin greatly expanded their province. Not only did they recreate their father's province but also at least doubled the territory, on all sides, but chiefly towards the south. The brothers ruled on the left riverside of the Vardar, from Kumanovo to Strumica. In 1373, two years after Maritsa, the first mentions are made on the events in the province of the Dejanović brothers, as well as their mutual relation. In June 1373, on the road from Thessaloniki to Novo Brdo, some Ragusan merchants had an accident in despot Jovan's land ("in terenum despotis Dragassii"). Ottoman sources report that in 1373, the Ottoman army compelled Jovan (who they called Saruyar) in the upper Struma, to recognize Ottoman vassalage. As Marko had done, also the Dejanović brothers recognized Ottoman sovereignty. Although vassals, they had their own government. The Ottoman gazi at the time conquered more than the Empire could put under its immediate control. Thus it is not surprising that the brothers had built an internal administration, shared possessions, issued charters, minted coins. In 1376, Konstantin took up a high position in the government, and this shows that the elder brother Jovan relatively early started to share the rule with his younger brother. On June 1, 1377, the brothers wrote a charter to Hilandar, where they confirmed the earlier donations of čelnik Stanislav; the donations included the Church of St. Blasius in Štip and three villages. In 1377 and 1380 the family issued charters to the Monastery of St. Panteleimon on Mount Athos. Jovan most often signed documents of the two. As the Dejanović brothers were maternally descended from the Nemanjić dynasty as grandsons of King Stefan Uroš III, they worked on expanding their rule and perhaps ultimately rule Serbia. The brothers spoke of "our Empire", and their mother Teodora-Evdokija signed as Empress. Their state symbol was the white double-headed eagle and they minted coins according to the Nemanjić style.

Jovan died in ca. 1378, before 1381. Konstantin continued to rule under the suzerainty of the Ottoman Empire.

By 1379, Lazar Hrebeljanović, the lord of Pomoravlje, emerged as the first and most powerful among Serbian nobles. In his signatures, he titled himself as the "Autokrator of all the Serbs" (самодрьжць вьсѣмь Србьлѥмь); nevertheless, he was not powerful enough to unite all Serbian lands under his authority. Konstantin, the Balšić, Mrnjavčević, Vuk Branković, and Radoslav Hlapen, ruled in their respective domains without consulting with Lazar.

Being an Ottoman vassal did not prevent the Ottomans from annexing Konstantin's territory. During a raid in 1385, they seized Štip from him.

Konstantin let the Ottoman army cross his province into Kosovo and also supported them with armed bands, before the Battle of Kosovo (1389).

Konstantin married, but his spouse's name is unknown. Konstantin had a daughter, Jelena, who in 1392 married Byzantine Emperor Manuel II. Although Manuel II and Konstantin maintained relations, they were of no political importance. Konstantin was an Ottoman vassal, within nearest reach and always on the look from Edirne and the Sultan, and was unable to change it.

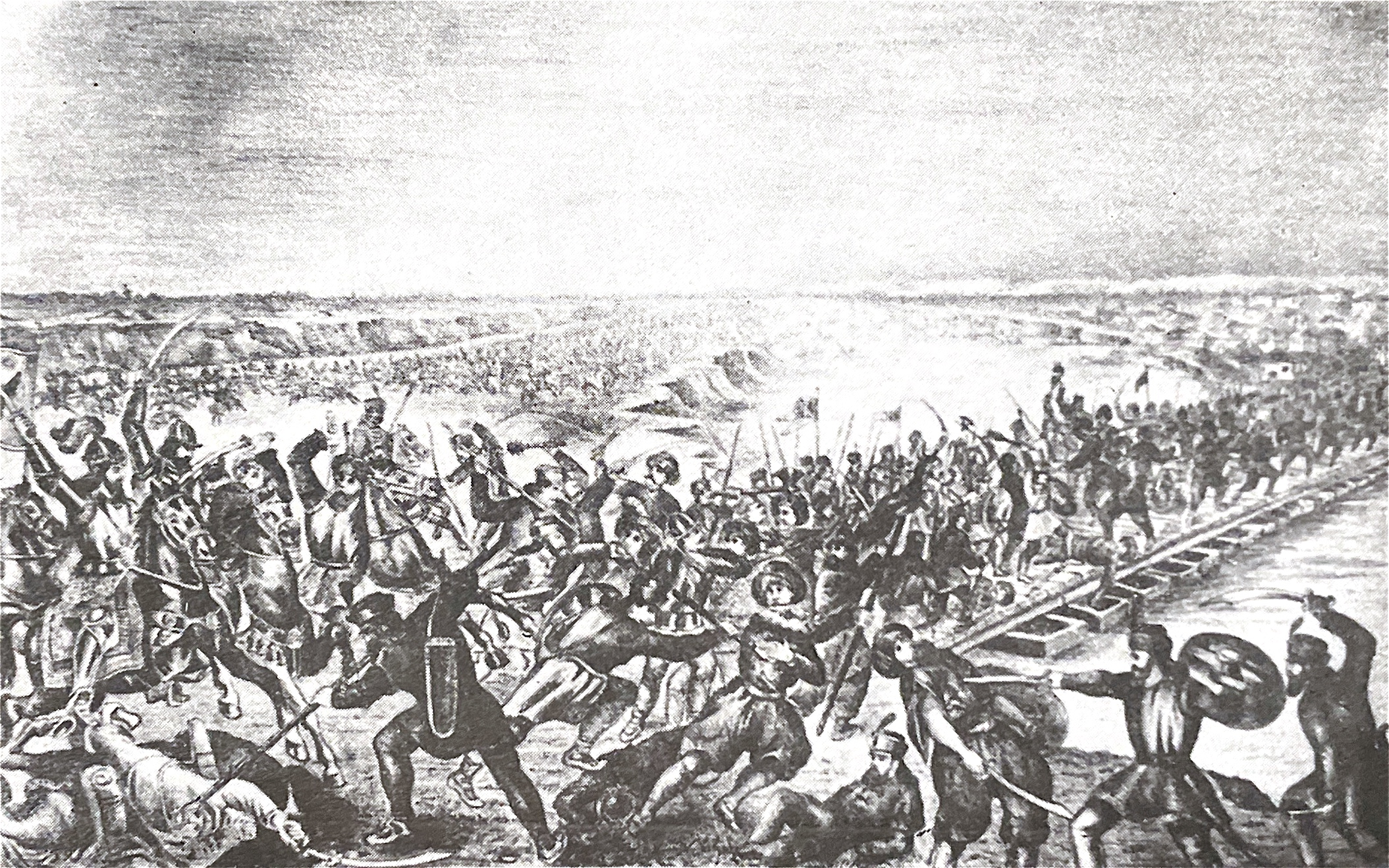
Battle of Rovine, 1395.

Bayezid, having conquered south Bulgaria, saw an opportunity for the conquest of Wallachia when dissatisfied Wallachian noblemen called for Ottoman support against Mircea I of Wallachia, which he accepted. Sigismund supported Mircea and helped him back to the throne, while Bayezid led a great army into Wallachia, composed also out of vassals Stefan Lazarević, Konstantin Dejanović and Marko. A contemporary source, Constantine the Philosopher, wrote that Marko unwillingly joined this fight against fellow Christians, and how he said to Konstantin: "I speak and pray to the Lord that he helps the Christians, even if I would be among the first to die in the battle.". In the Wallachian victory at the Battle of Rovine (17 May 1395), both Marko and Konstantin died. The provinces of Marko and Konstantin became Ottoman.

== Domain of the Dejanović family ==
=== Dejan's possessions, Serbian Empire ===
According to Emperor Dušan's Arhiljevica charter (August 1355), sevastokrator Dejan possessed the župe (counties) of Žegligovo and Preševo (modern Kumanovo region with Sredorek, Kozjačija and the larger part of Pčinja). As despot under the rule of Uroš V, Dejan was entrusted with the administration of the territory between South Morava, Pčinja, Skopska Crna Gora (hereditary lands) and in the east, the Upper Struma river with Velbužd (Kyustendil), a province notably larger than during Dušan's life.

=== Jovan's and Konstantin's possessions, Ottoman Empire ===
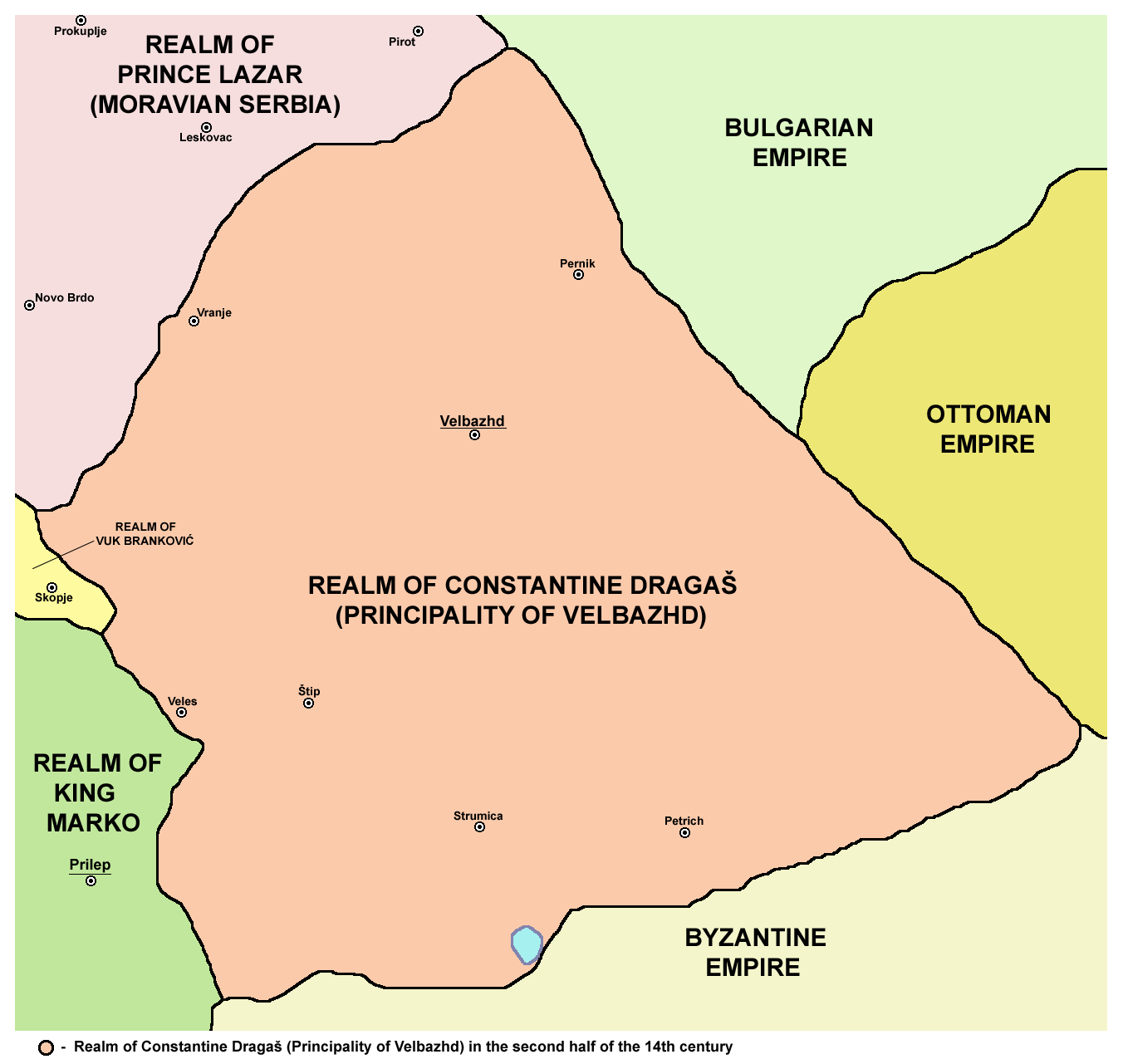
Approximate territorial extent (1373–1395).

Dejan's son Jovan became a vassal of the Ottoman Empire after the Battle of Maritsa (1371), and Konstantin also acknowledged Ottoman suzerainty. Their province (oblast) during the fall of the Serbian Empire was roughly located between the rivers Struma and Vardar and included territories of the modern countries of Bulgaria, Serbia and North Macedonia. According to Stojan Novaković, the province "spanned from Prince Lazar's border (between Kumanovo and Preševo and the Skopska Crna Gora ridge) and then much further towards the south, as it looks, to the wreath that in the south marks the border of the waterfall of the Dojran and Bulgarian lake".

There were some four disputes regarding boundaries in the Strumica region within Konstantin's province, dated year 6884 (September 1, 1375 - August 31, 1376): of the metochion (church-dependent territory) between Hilandar and Agiou Panteleimonos monastery; Hilandar and nobleman Vojin Radišić; Hilandar and Bogoslav, the lord of Nežičino village; the boundary confirmation of Prosenikov village.

=== Economy ===
The brothers minted coins according to the Nemanjić style, and used the white double-headed eagle (Serbian eagle).

The province of the brothers had business with foreign merchants, and besides the domestic currency there was also Venetian moneta in circulation. The important Via de Zenta trade route connecting the Adriatic with Serbia crossed this region; it was used for the trade between Republic of Venice and Ragusa and Serbia and Bulgaria. It started in the Zetan ports and towns, continued along the Drin Valley to Prizren, then to Lipljan, then through Novo Brdo to Vranje and Niš. The road ended its use with the Ottoman conquest of Serbia.

They had vast mines in Kratovo (until 1390) and Zletovo.

== Aftermath and legacy ==
Konstantin married, but his spouse's name is unknown, and from this marriage Konstantin had a daughter, Jelena, who in 1392 married Byzantine Emperor Manuel II Palaiologos (r. 1391–1425). Manuel II and Jelena had several children, among whom were the last Byzantine Emperors John VIII (r. 1425–1448) and Constantine XI (r. 1449–1453). Constantine XI, the last Byzantine Emperor, who died defending Constantinople from the Ottomans in 1453, was known by his mother's surname, in Greek, Dragáses (Δραγάσης). Constantine XI was named after his grandfather.

Konstantin Dragaš is attested in Serb epic poetry as "beg Kostadin", as a friend of Prince Marko.

Kyustendil, even in its turkified name, still keeps the memory of its lord, Konstantin. Turkish custendil means "Konstantin's bath/spa".

The Kumanovo region (old Žegligovo) received its geographical location and certain settlement picture in the 14th century, during the rule of the Nemanjić and Dejanović.

== Buildings ==
=== Church buildings ===
The Dejanović family built and reconstructed several churches and monasteries throughout their province. Some of these include the Zemen Monastery and Arhiljevica Church, built by Dejan, and the Poganovo Monastery and Osogovo Monastery, built by Konstantin. View the collapsible list below for a complete overview of church buildings that were located in the family's province.

List of church buildings in the Province
Name, location	Founded	Notes	Image
In the Kyustendil region (Bulgaria and Serbia):
Spasovica, in Velbužd (modern Kyustendil)	1330, by Stefan Uroš III	Built in honour of the victory at the Battle of Velbazhd against the Bulgarians, on the location where King Stefan prayed in his tent the night before the battle.	
Church of St. George, in Koluši (modern Kyustendil)		Seat of the local Metropolitanate.	
Church of Gospođino Polje, in Koluši	14th century		
Church of the Annunciation, in Slokoštica (modern Kyustendil)	1378–1395	Built during the rule of Konstantin	
Church of St. Nicholas, in Slokoštica	1378–1395	Built during the rule of Konstantin	
Church of the Sts. Archangels, in Slokoštica	1378–1395	Built during the rule of Konstantin	
Church of St. Demetrius, in Slokoštica	1378–1395	Built during the rule of Konstantin	
Church of St. Parascheva, in Slokoštica	1378–1395	Built during the rule of Konstantin	
Church of St. John the Baptist (Zemen monastery), in Zemen (modern Pernik Province)	by Dejan	Built on the ruins of an earlier 11th-century church. There are ktitor frescoes depicting Dejan in the monastery.	
Church of St. John the Baptist (Poganovo monastery), in Poganovo (modern Pirot District)	1378–1395, by Konstantin		
Churches in Tran and Breznik	1378–1395, by Konstantin		
In the Kratovo and Kriva Palanka regions (Macedonia):
Lesnovo monastery, in Lesnovo (modern Probištip)	1341, by Jovan Oliver		
Church of St. Demetrius, in Zletovo (modern Probištip)	14th century		
Church of St. Nicholas, in Zletovo	14th century		
Pirog monastery, in Zletovo	14th century		
Monastery of St. Joachim of Osogovo, in Kriva Palanka	1378–1395, by Konstantin	Endowment of Konstantin.	
Church of St. Nicholas (Psača Monastery), in Psača	ca. 1358, by Vlatko Paskačić		
In the Štip region (Macedonia):
Church of Sts. Archangels (Rila monastery), in Štip	ca. 1334, by Hrelja	Hrelja built the church on the location of an older 10th-century monastery.	
Church of Holy Salvation, in Štip	1369, by Dmitar	Built by a Dejanović relative, Dmitar.	
Church of St. Nicholas, in Štip	14th century		
Church of St. John the Baptist, in Štip	14th century		
Church of St. Demetrius, in Kočani	by Jovan Oliver		
In the Žegligovo region (Preševo, Serbia; Kumanovo, Macedonia) and Pčinja region (Serbia):
Church of St. George, in Staro Nagoričane	1313, by Stefan Milutin	Built on the location of an earlier Byzantine church built in 1071.	
Church of the Holy Mother of God, in Arhiljevica	1349, by Dejan		
Church of the Holy Mother of God (Matejić monastery), in Matejče	1331–1355	The "Church of the Holy Mother of God of the Black Mountain" in the Matejić (Matejče) mountain was reconstructed during the rule of Stefan Dušan, and is today known as the Matejić monastery.	
Church of St. Nicholas, in Norča, Preševo	by Neofit	Built by monk Neofit.	
Church of St. Prohor of Pčinja, in Pčinja	by Stefan Milutin	Built on the location of an earlier 11th-century monastery built by Byzantine Emperor Romanos IV Diogenes (r. 1068–1071).	
Church of St. Nicholas, in Pčinja	by Stefan Milutin	Later reconstructed by Dušan.	
In the Strumica region (Macedonia):
In the Crna Reka region (Macedonia):
In the Veles region (Macedonia):

== Family ==
Dejan (fl. 1345–1358/1365); Serbian nobleman, served: • Dušan (1345–1355); • Uroš V (1355–1358/1365).	Teodora-Evdokija (fl. 1345–?); Serbian princess, sister of Dušan.
Jovan (fl. 1365–†1378); Serbian nobleman, served: • Uroš V (1365–1371); • Ottoman (1371-1378).	Žarko	Teodora	Đurađ I Balšić	Unknown	Konstantin (fl. 1365–†1395); Serbian nobleman, served: • Ottoman (1378-1395).	Eudokia Megale Komnene (fl. 1378–†1395); Byzantine princess.
Ruđina Balšić	Mrkša	See: Balšić noble family	Jelena (ca. 1372–1450); Byzantine Empress.	Manuel II Palaiologos (1350–1425); Byzantine Emperor. (1391-1425)
9 children; John VIII Palaiologos; Constantine XI Palaiologos

There are possible portraits of the family in their monasteries (ktetor frescoes), but it is not affirmed that these represent Dejan's family.

== Annotations ==
1. The family is known as Dejanović (Serbian Cyrillic: Дејановић) and Dragaš (Драгаш); Dejanovići, Dragaši in plural (Дејановићи, Драгаши). Their family name in historiography, Dejanović, is derived from the progenitor Dejan. Jovan, the son of Dejan, usually signed himself "despot Jovan Dragaš", or simply "despot Dragaš", while only one document mention Konstantin by this name. The Dragaš name was thus used by Jovan and Konstantin, and Jelena's son Constantine XI. There is possibility that Dejan also used this name.
2. It is known in historiography as the province of the Dejanović family (Serbian: Област Дејановића / Oblast Dejanovića) or province of the Dragaš family (Област Драгаша / Oblast Dragaša). In Bulgarian sources it has also been rarely referred to as Duchy of Velbazhd (Bulgarian: Велбъждско княжество), Duchy of Kyustendil (Кюстендилско княжество) and Duchy of the Dragaš (Княжество на Драгаши).
