= Dejan (despot) =

Serbian nobleman (1346–c.1366)

- sevastokrator and despot of the Serbian Empire
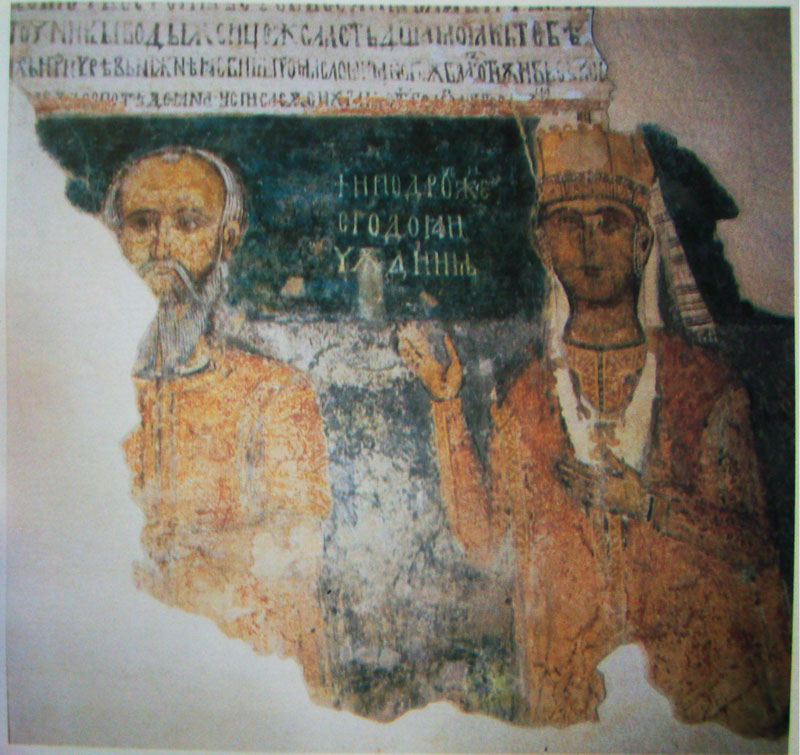
- Dejan and his wife, fresco from the Zemen Monastery.

Serbian imperial magnate
- Reign: sevastokrator (fl. 1346–55); despot (fl. 1355–58+)
- Other titles: vojvoda (војвода), general; sevastokrator (севастократор), second-highest court title at that time; despot (деспот), highest court title at that time; (possibly) logotet (логотет), state secretary
- Born: Serbian Kingdom
- Died: between 1366 and 1371; Serbian Empire
- Noble family: Dejanović
- Spouse: Teodora Nemanjić
- Issue: Jovan; Konstantin; Teodora

Dejan (Serbian Cyrillic: Дејан; fl. 1346 – c. 1366) was a magnate who served Serbian Emperor Stefan Dušan (r. 1331–55) as sevastokrator, and Emperor Uroš V (r. 1355–71) as despot. He was married to Emperor Dušan's sister Teodora, and possessed a large province in the Kumanovo region, east of Skopska Crna Gora. It initially included the old župe (counties) of Žegligovo and Preševo (modern Kumanovo region with Sredorek, Kozjačija and the larger part of Pčinja). Uroš V later gave Dejan the Upper Struma river with Velbužd (Kyustendil). Dejan rebuilt the Zemen Monastery, one of Dejan's endowments, among others, as he also reconstructed several church buildings throughout his province.

Dejan was one of the prominent figures of Dušan's reign and during the fall of the Serbian Empire after Dušan's death. Dejan is the progenitor of the Dejanović noble family, with his two sons, despot Jovan and gospodin Konstantin, also becoming powerful during the fall of the Serbian Empire and the ensuing Ottoman period.

== Life ==
=== Origin ===
Dejan had married Teodora, the sister of King Stefan Dušan, and received the title of sevastokrator in 1346, upon Stefan Dušan's crowning as Emperor. Dejan's origin is deemed unknown. Earlier scholars believed that Dejan was a relative of Jovan Oliver, another magnate in Macedonia, but this is no longer accepted. K. J. Jireček suggested that he was vojvoda Dejan Manjak (Дејан Мањак), only found mentioned in a 1333 charter, in which Stefan Dušan officially sold Ston and Prevlaka to the Republic of Ragusa.

=== Stefan Dušan's reign ===
On Easter, 16 April 1346, Stefan Dušan convoked a massive assembly at Skopje, attended by the Serbian Archbishop Joanikije II, the Archbishop of Ochrid Nikolaj I, the Bulgarian Patriarch Simeon and various religious leaders of Mount Athos. The autocephalous Serbian Archbishopric was raised to the status of a Patriarchate. The new Patriarch, Joanikije II, now solemnly crowned Dušan as "Emperor and autocrat of Serbs and Romans (Greeks)". Dušan had his son Uroš V crowned King, giving him nominal rule over the Serbian lands, and although Dušan ruled the whole state, he had special responsibility for the "Roman", i.e. Greek lands, in the south. There was a further increase in the Byzantinization of the Serbian court, especially in court ceremonies and titles. From his new position, Dušan could grant titles only possible for an emperor to grant, such as despot, sevastokrator, and ćesar. Among the Serbian magnates were:

- despot Simeon Uroš, Dušan's half-brother, duke of Epirus and Acarnania
- despot Jovan Asen, Dušan's brother-in-law, governor in southern Albania
- despot Jovan Oliver, Dušan's close associate, vojvoda and governor in Ovče Pole and left Vardar
- sevastokrator Dejan, Dušan's brother-in-law, governor of Pčinja
- sevastokrator Branko, Dušan's relative, governor of Ohrid
- ćesar Preljub, Dušan's son-in-law, vojvoda and governor of Thessaly
- ćesar Vojihna, Dušan's relative, vojvoda and governor of Drama
- ćesar Grgur, Dušan's relative (son of Branko), vojvoda and governor of Polog

The raising of the Serbian Patriarchate resulted in bishops becoming metropolitans. The Serbian ruler had wide autocratic powers, but was surrounded and advised by a permanent council of magnates (velikaši or velmože) and prelates. The court, chancellery and administration were rough copies of those of Constantinople.

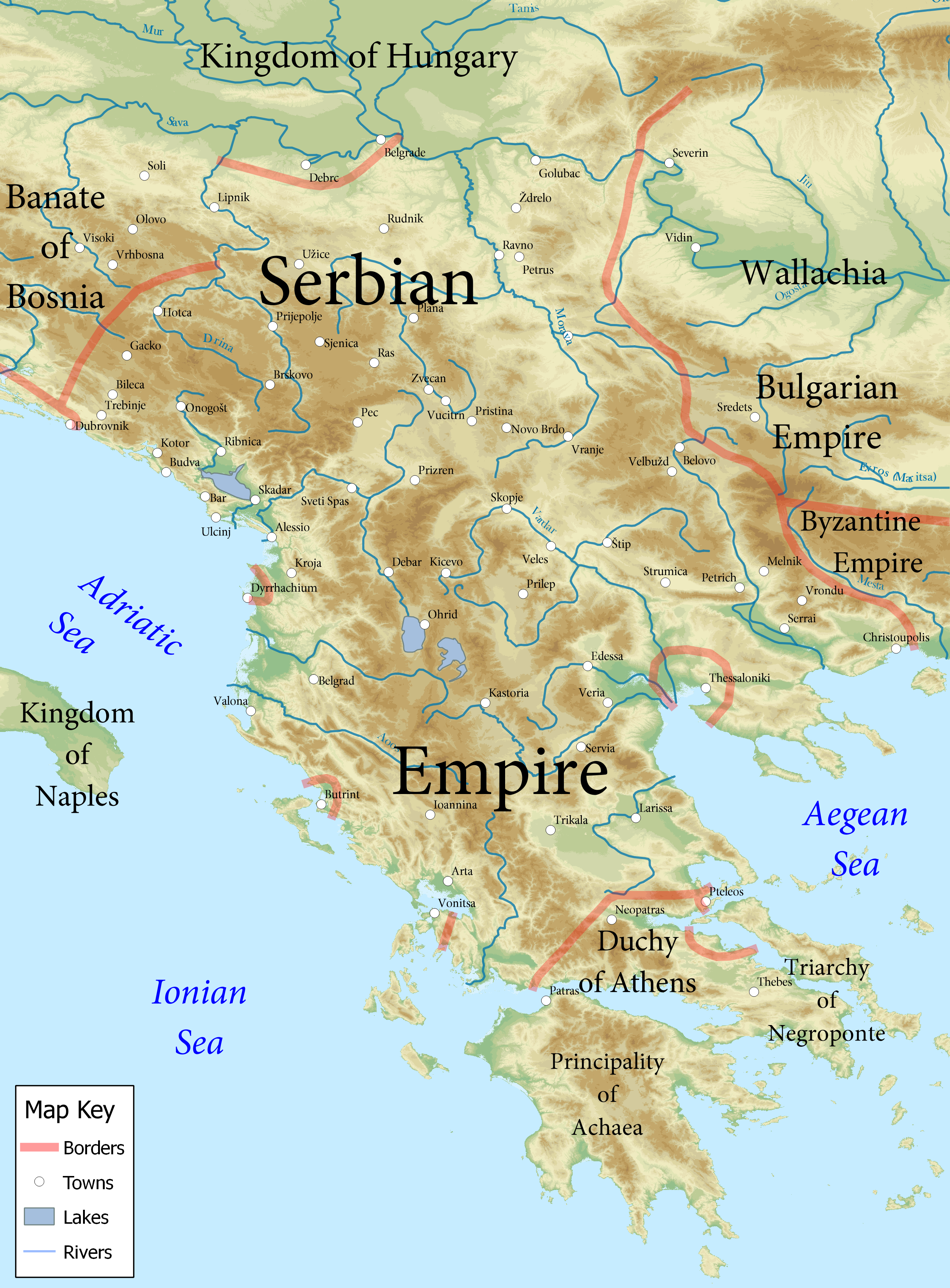
Map of the Serbian Empire (1355). Dejan ruled an area roughly starting from the east of Skopje eastwards towards Velbužd.

In 1354, when Dejan had finished building the Arhiljevica Church of the Holy Mother of God, his endowment, he asked that some of the villages under his administration be granted to the church (as metochion). According to Stefan Dušan's charter to Arhiljevica dated 10 August 1354, sevastokrator Dejan, whom he called his brother ("брат царства ми севастократор Дејан"), possessed a large province east of Skopska Crna Gora. It included the old župe (counties) of Žegligovo and Preševo (modern Kumanovo region with Sredorek, Kozjačija and the larger part of Pčinja). The granted villages included: village Podlešane with hamlets, village Arhiljevica at the church with hamlets, village Izvor, village Ruginci (Ruǵince), selište (arable land) Mokra Poljana (Mokro Polje), village Maistorije, selište Maistorije Krupnici, selište Prusci (Rusce), selište Vrdun, selište Prvevo, selište Deikovo (Dejlovce), selište Vrače (Vračevce), selište Sedlar, selište Mekša and village Glaže (Glažnja). A total of 9 villages, 9 selište and a few hamlets. Based on the charter, Arhiljevica was situated where the granted villages of Podlešane, Izvor and Rućinci lay, on the slopes of Jezer (Kumanovska Crna Gora). The fact that Dejan built Arhiljevica rather than renovated it is evidence of his economic strength. Apart from Dejan's granted villages, Dušan also granted, on his behalf as a gift, the church and village of Gospoždino Polje (lost), village Koznica Kričanovska (Gorna- and Dolna Koznitsa) and village Strojkovo (lost), situated in the Velbužd region.

Dejan was one of the prominent figures of Dušan's reign and during the subsequent fall of the Serbian Empire, after Dušan's death. Under Emperor Dušan, despot Jovan Oliver, with his brother Bogdan and sevastokrator Dejan, ruled over all of eastern Macedonia. Dejan is not mentioned much in Dušan's military endeavors, although his reputation and that of his successors suggest that he was involved in most of Dušan's successes. His prominence beyond Serbia is also evident from the fact that Pope Innocent VI addressed Dejan in 1355, asking him to support the creation of the union between the Catholic Church and the Serbian Orthodox Church (such letters were sent to the highest nobility and the church).

=== Uroš V's reign ===
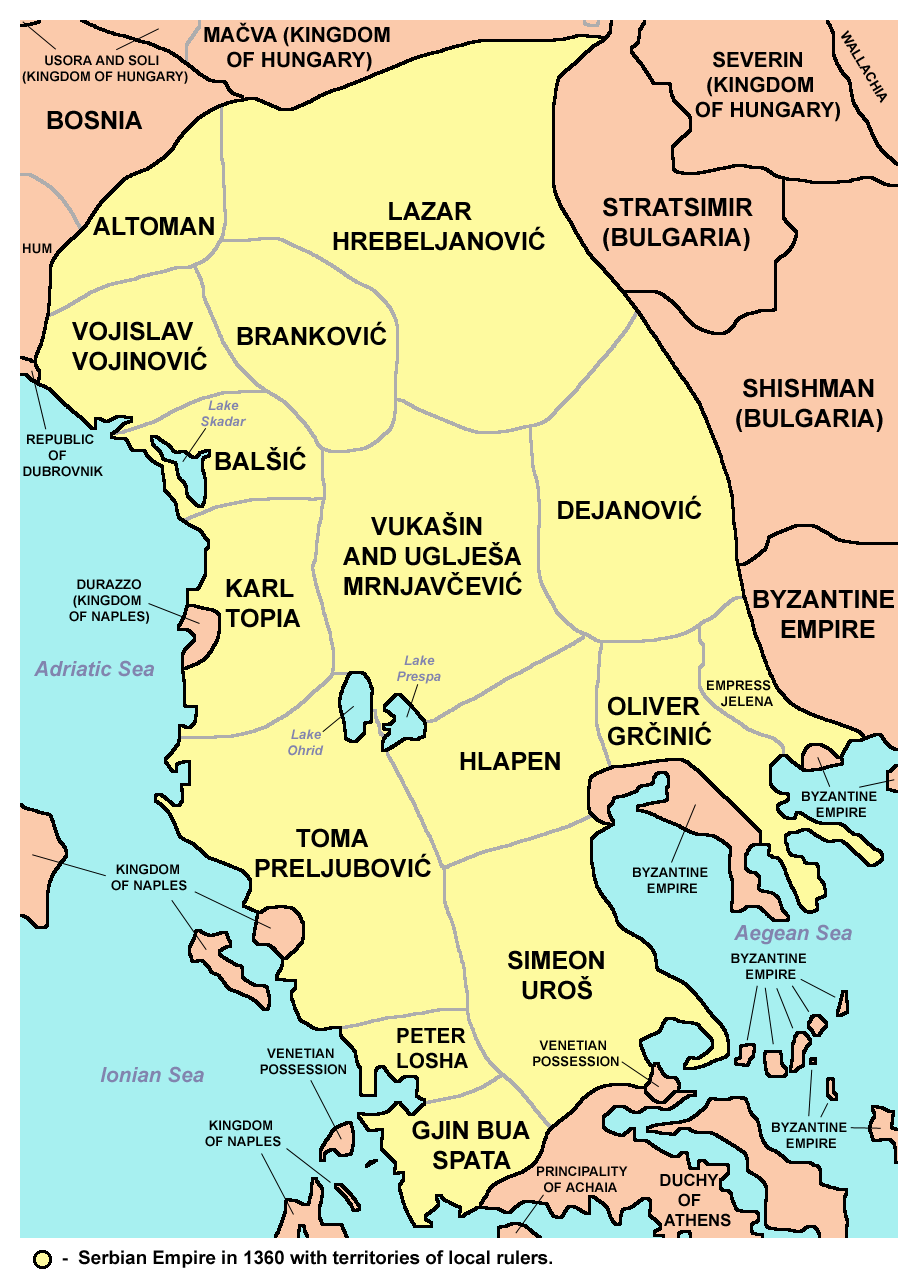
Map of the Serbian Empire in 1360 with territories of local rulers

Dejan received the title of despot sometime after August 1355, either from Emperor Dušan, who died on 20 December 1355, or from his heir Uroš V, most likely the latter. During the rule of Uroš V, Dejan was entrusted with the administration of the territory between South Morava, Pčinja, Skopska Crna Gora (his hereditary lands) and in the east, Upper Struma river with Velbužd (Kyustendil), a province notably larger than he had possessed during Dušan's life. This province was located in the very heart of the Balkans, and the important Via de Zenta, a trade route connecting the Adriatic with the interior of the Balkans, crossed it. As the only despot, Dejan held the highest title in the Empire (this had earlier been the veliki vojvoda, Jovan Oliver). Dejan's daughter Teodora married Žarko, the lord of Lower Zeta, in 1356.

Serbian historian Miloš Blagojević supported the view in historiography that Dejan also served as logotet (fl. 1362–1365), mentioned as the envoy of Emperor Uroš alongside ćesar Grgur in the peace talks with the Republic of Ragusa, which had been at war with Vojislav Vojinović in southern Dalmatia. The peace was concluded on 22 August 1362, in Onogošt (Nikšić), and the Emperor's charter confirmed the "old laws" and other laws regarding the Ragusans. Dejan and Grgur each received 100 ducats.

Until Vojislav's death in December 1363, the Serbian nobles in the Greek lands showed themselves more ambitious, as they held more titles and greater independence (deriving from their more extensive possessions, and therefore, wealth) in relation to the nobility of the old Serbian lands. While Vojislav lived, his influence secured the preeminence of the old Serbian nobility. After Vojislav's death, Vukašin Mrnjavčević, who had previously served Emperor Dušan as a župan (count, holder of a župa, a "county" or "district") of Prilep, quickly gained a decisive influence on Emperor Uroš V. The nobility in the old Serbian lands was not at first alarmed at this, but Vukašin's ambition and his subsequent power moves woke up the simmering antagonism between the two groups. It was not only Vukašin's endless ambition that led to his success, as he had plenty of support from other nobles who benefited from him.

It is not known for certain when Dejan died, as no Serbian or foreign sources have been found with information that could give historians clues to which year he died. S. Mandić said it may have been as early as 1358, and that Vukašin, who until then was veliki vojvoda, took Dejan's place as despot, and in turn Jovan Uglješa became veliki vojvoda. V. Ćorović believed it to have been sometime after the death of Vojislav (1363). M. Rajičić concluded that it was between 1366 and 1371, as he believed Jovan Oliver to have held his lands at least to 1366, and based on that the Pčinja pomenik (memorial book) said that Dejan had died after Jovan Oliver (this is refuted by S. Mandić). S. Mandić also believed that it was unlikely that Dejan took monastic vows before his death, as his children were still young. His wife Teodora took monastic vows as Evdokija and lived in Strumica and Velbužd, and she would until her death sign as basilissa (Empress), as did: Ana-Marija, the wife of Jovan Oliver; Marija, wife of despot Toma Preljubović; and Jefimija, the wife of Uglješa.

Dejan built and reconstructed several churches and monasteries throughout his province, including the rebuilding of the Zemen Monastery and the lost Arhiljevica Church. His two sons Jovan and Konstantin later became rulers of his domain.

== Aftermath ==
After the death of Dejan, his province, except for the župe of Žegligovo and Upper Struma, was appropriated to nobleman Vlatko Paskačić, whose hereditary land was Slavište directly to the south. Vukašin Mrnjavčević, of whom there are no notable mentions until 1365, became more powerful (ultimately the most powerful nobleman in Macedonia) after the deaths of Vojislav Vojinović, Dejan and despot Jovan Oliver (whose status in Macedonia was very high), as Vukašin's rise would have been unlikely during the lifetime of these men. Vukašin's younger brother Jovan Uglješa is also thought to have participated in the dismemberment of Dejan's province, as he used this chance to take the provinces which bordered on the oblast (province) of Ser (Serres). No one looked to the young sons of Dejan who would later become very important. Dejan's death benefited Vukašin and Jovan Uglješa, not so much in territorial expansion (which is not so sure), but because Dejan's disappearance ended any stronger candidate to counter the Mrnjavčević family.

Like his father before, Dejan's eldest son Jovan received the title of despot from Emperor Uroš. He and his brother later received most of Jovan Oliver's lands. It is not known why Jovan Oliver's sons did not inherit his lands. Serbian historian V. Ćorović attributed this to turmoil and disorder, though it is not known what extent it developed to and what the consequences were. Earlier scholars believed that the Dejanović were relatives of Jovan Oliver, although this is no longer accepted. The Dejanović brothers ruled a spacious province in eastern Macedonia, in the southern lands of the Empire, and remained loyal to Uroš V until his death. Emperor Uroš V died childless on 2/4 December 1371, after many of the Serbian nobility had been killed in the Battle of Maritsa against the Ottomans earlier that year. This marked an end to the once powerful Serbian Empire. Vukašin's son Marko, who had earlier been crowned Young King, was to inherit his father's royal title, and thus became one in the line of successors to the Serbian throne. Meanwhile, the nobles pursued their own interests, sometimes quarreling with each other. Serbia, without an Emperor, became "a conglomerate of aristocratic territories", and the Empire was thus divided between the provincial lords: Marko Mrnjavčević, the Dejanović brothers, Đurađ I Balšić, Vuk Branković, Nikola Altomanović, and Lazar Hrebeljanović. In the new redistribution of feudal power, after 1371, the brothers despot Jovan and gospodin (lord) Konstantin greatly expanded their province, not only recreating their father's province, but also at least doubling the territory, on all sides, but chiefly to the south. The brothers ruled on the left riverside of the Vardar, from Kumanovo to Strumica. In 1373, two years after Maritsa, the first mentions are made on the events in the province of the Dejanović brothers, as well as their mutual relation. As Marko had done, also the Dejanović brothers recognized Ottoman sovereignty. Although vassals, they had their own government. Their state symbol was the white double-headed eagle and they minted coins according to the Nemanjić style.

== Family ==
Dejan had two marriages. First with unknown noble called Vladislava, and second with Teodora. Dejan and his first wife Vladislava had four children:

- Jovan (ca. 1343 – ca. 1378), despot under Emperor Uroš; vassal of the Ottoman Empire since 1373 until his death in 1378.
- Konstantin (fl. 1365–95), gospodin under Emperor Uroš; succeeded his brother as vassal of the Ottoman Empire from 1378 until his death in 1395.
- Teodora (fl. 1356–71), married firstly gospodin Žarko (in 1356), then Đurađ I Balšić (after 1371). She had a son with Žarko, Mrkša (born 1363).
- Dimitar Dragaš

== Annotations ==
1. His name was Dejan (Дејан). He is usually referred to with his titles despot Dejan (деспот Дејан) and sevastokrator Dejan (севастократор Дејан) in Serbian sources. His son Jovan usually signed himself "despot Jovan Dragaš", or simply "despot Dragaš", while only one document mention Konstantin by this name. The Dragaš name was thus used by Jovan and Konstantin, and Jelena's son Constantine XI. There is possibility that Dejan also used this name, though he is never mentioned with it.

Court offices
Preceded by Jovan Oliver as of the Serbian Kingdom	sevastokrator of Stefan Dušan; 1346–1355; Served alongside: Branko (1346–?)	Succeeded by Vlatko
Preceded by Jovan Oliver, Jovan Asen and Simeon Uroš	despot of Uroš V after Aug 1356	Succeeded by Vukašin
