= Glažnja =

Glažnja Глажња Gllazhnjë
- Village
- Location within North Macedonia
- Coordinates: 42°11′2″N 21°32′33″E
- Country: North Macedonia
- Region: Southeastern
- Municipality: Lipkovo
- Elevation: 730 m (2,400 ft)

Population (2021)
  - Total: 19
- Time zone: UTC+1 (CET)
  - Summer (DST): UTC+2 (CEST)
- Car plates: KU
- Website: .

Glažnja (Macedonian: Глажња; Albanian: Gllazhnjë) is a village in northeastern North Macedonia, in the municipality of Lipkovo. According to the 2002 census, it had 54 inhabitants.

== Geography ==
To the nearest city, the settlement is 25 kilometres west of Kumanovo. Glažnja is situated in the historical region of Crnogorje, above the Lipkovo river valley, in the upper part of the course, on the highlands of middle Skopska Crna Gora. In the lowest part of the cadastral area lies the Lipkovo lake. It is close to 730 m above sea.

== History ==
In Serbian Emperor Stefan Dušan's (r. 1331–55) confirmed on 10 August 1354, several villages, settlements and arable land which was granted (metochion) by despot Dejan to his endowment, the Arhiljevica Church of the Holy Mother of God. Glaže was one of the mentioned selište (arable land). In the 1379 charter of Dejan's son Konstantin, it had evolved into a village, with the current name of Glažnja. The Kumanovo region (old Žegligovo) received its geographical location and certain settlement picture in the 14th century, during the rule of the Nemanjić and Dejanović.

== Demographics ==
As of the 2021 census, Glažnja had 19 residents with the following ethnic composition:

- Albanians 15
- Persons for whom data are taken from administrative sources 4

According to the 2002 census, the village had a total of 54 inhabitants. Ethnic groups in the village include:

- Albanians 53
- Others 1
