= Jovan Oliver =

Serbian magnate

Jovan Oliver Grčinić
- despot, sevastokrator, veliki vojvoda, veliki čelnik
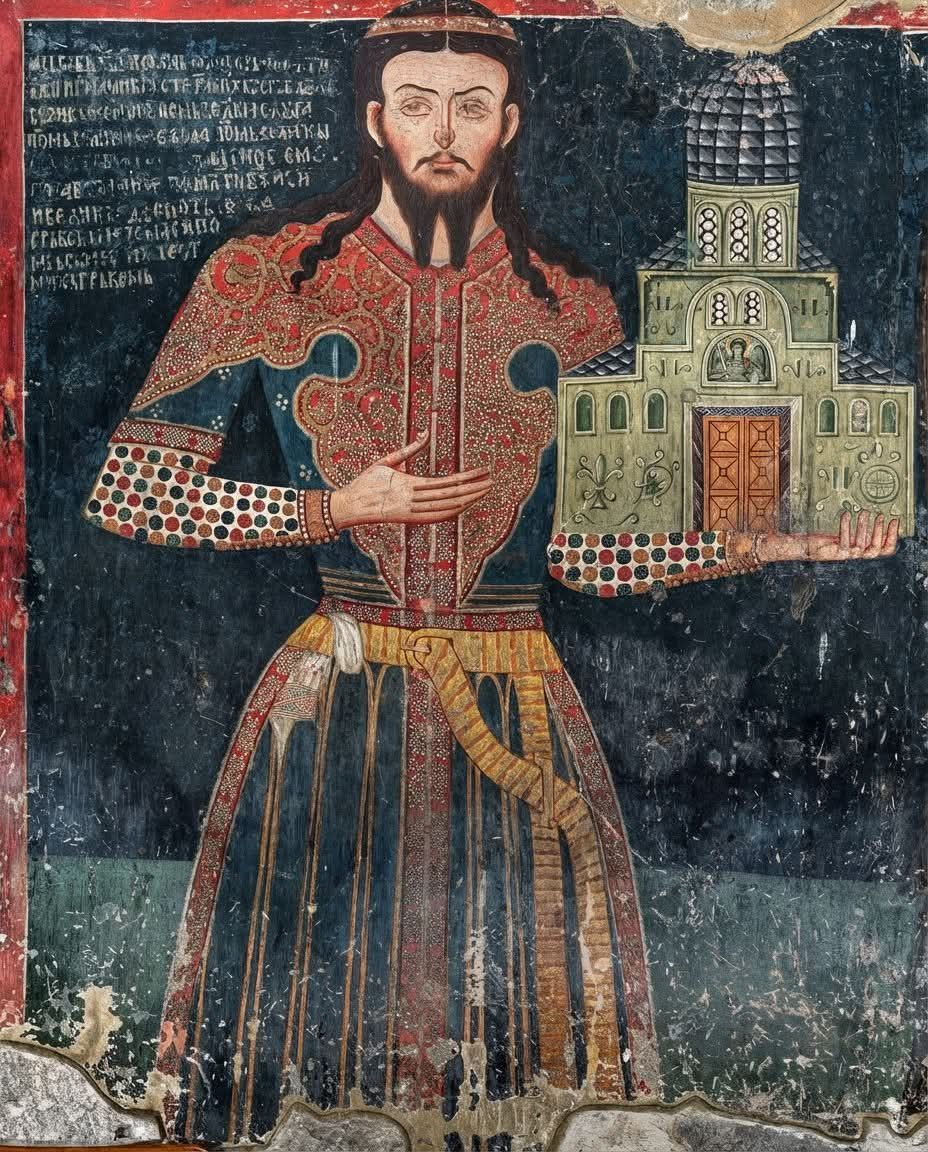
- Jovan Oliver, wearing a "cloud collar". Fresco from the Lesnovo monastery.
- Reign: Lord of Ovče Pole and the left bank of the Vardar
- Full name: Jovan Oliver Grčinić (Јован Оливер Грчинић)
- Born: ca. 1310
- Died: ca. 1356
- Wife: Karavida (†1336); Maria Palaiologina
- Issue: see family
- Father: vlastelin Grčin

Jovan Oliver Grčinić (Serbian: Јован Оливер Грчинић; ca. 1310–1356) was a magnate of the Serbian Emperor Dušan the Mighty (r. 1331–1355), holding the titles of sebastokrator and despotes, and the rank of "great voivode", showing his prominence and status as one of the most important nobles of Dušan. Oliver supported Dušan in the succession war against his father, and was one of the supreme generals in the southern military expeditions (Macedonia, Thessaly). His province included Ovče Pole and the left bank of the Vardar. After the death of Emperor Dušan, there are no more mentions of Oliver. During the fall of the Serbian Empire, his lands were held by the Dejanovići.

== Life ==
Jovan was the son a vlastelin Grčin (Грчин, "Greek") who had lands in some part of the Serbian Kingdom.

Jovan is referred to in a Ragusan source as Oliver Grčinić, and his knowledge of Greek lends support to the notion of a Greek origin. He ruled his domain, in modern-day North Macedonia, as a semi-independent prince, acknowledging Dušan's suzerainty but not subordinate to him. He probably had supported Dušan's overthrow of his father, King Uroš III, in 1331, and after the death of his first wife, Karavida, in 1336, he married Maria Palaiologina, Dušan's stepmother. His second wife is depicted in a 1349 fresco and described as "Maria Lyverina" or "Ana Maria Liverina" at Lesnovo. There is considerable scholarly debate as to when Jovan Oliver acquired his domains, i.e. whether he held them before Dušan's accession, whether they were granted to him by Dušan as a reward for his support, or whether he gained them as a result of his marriage to Maria.

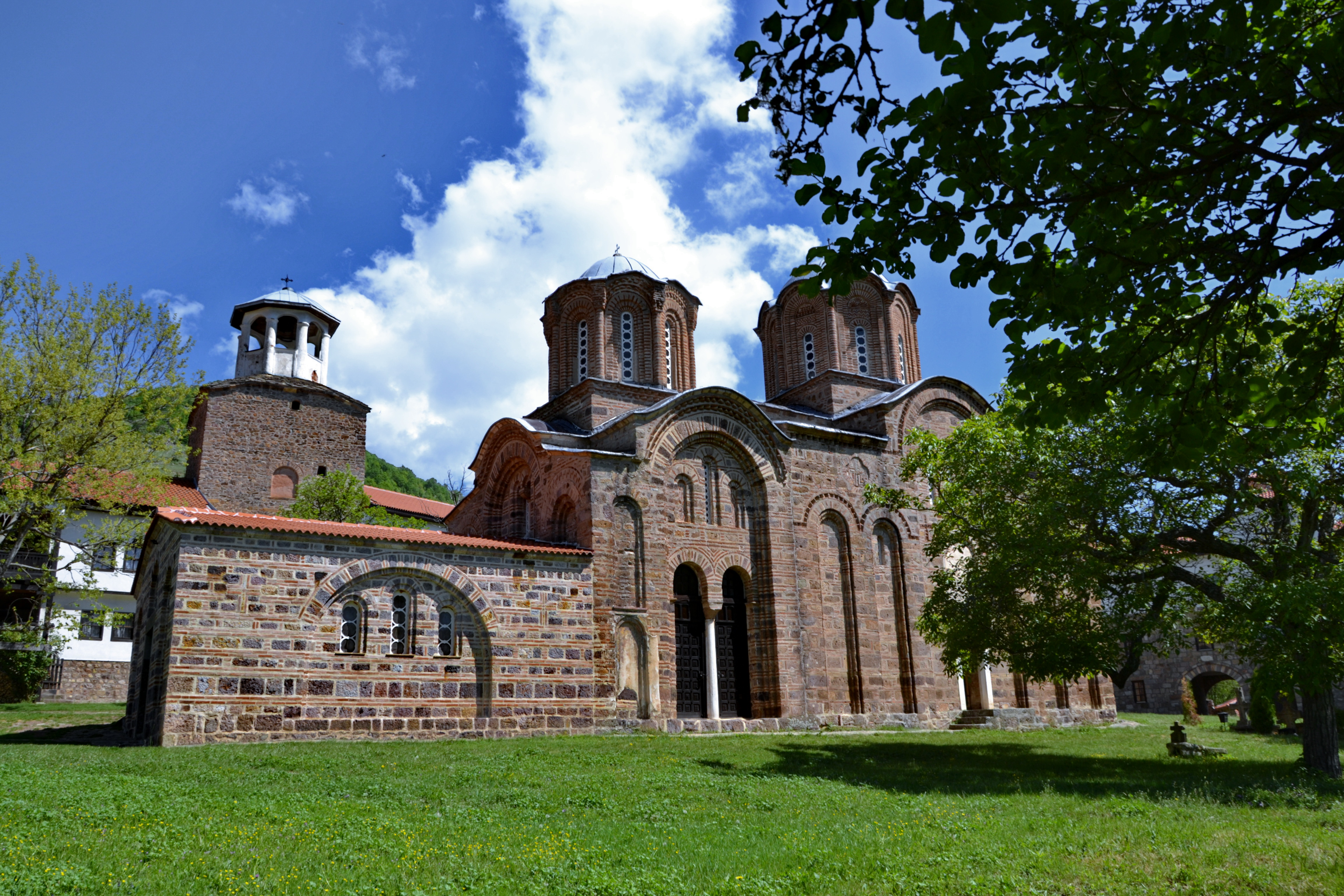
Lesnovo monastery was founded by Jovan Oliver

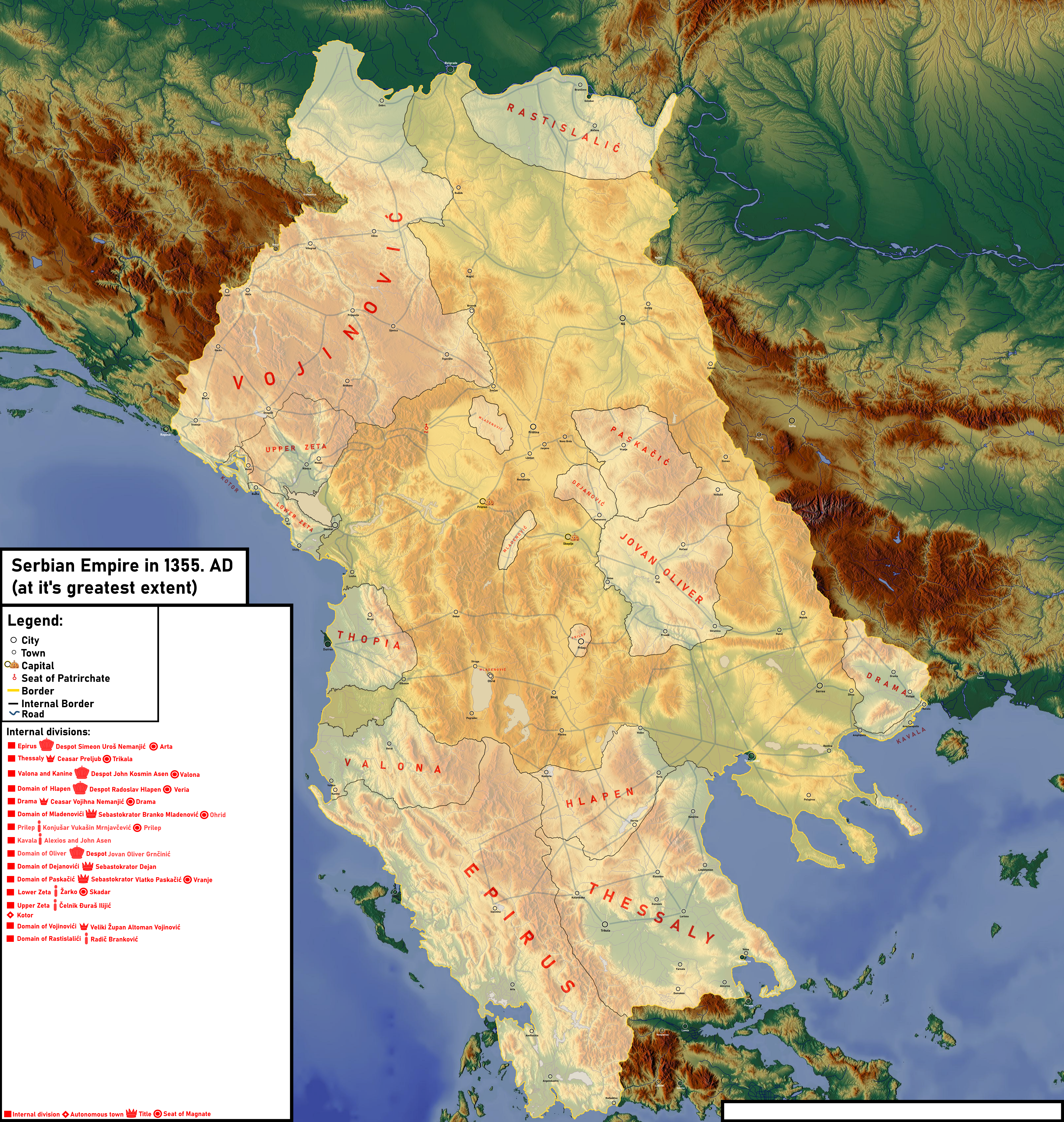
Jovan Oliver's possessions within Serbian Empire in 1355

At any rate, he was one of the most powerful nobles under Dušan, and exercised considerable influence over him, as evidenced in the negotiations in July 1342 which led to the decision to support John VI Kantakouzenos in the Byzantine civil war of 1341–1347, in exchange for which he hoped to marry his daughter to Manuel Kantakouzenos. He was also active in the 1334 war with the Byzantine Empire, and was present during the subsequent peace negotiations together with Vratko Nemanjić, when Jovan was probably named despotes by Andronikos III Palaiologos. With the death of Hrelja in late 1342, when the latter's domain was split between Jovan Oliver and Dušan, he was able to further expand his lands, including the important towns of Štip and Strumica.

In 1341, imitating the Serbian kings, he built the Eastern Orthodox Lesnovo monastery as his endowment. Jovan Oliver outlived Dušan, but after his death, his sons were unable to assert themselves: possibly opposed by a coalition of other nobles, they failed to acquire any positions of importance, and most of their father's lands were taken over by Constantine and John, the sons of sebastokrator Dejan Dragaš of Kumanovo.

== Family ==
He had 7 children:

- Danica
- Krajko (or Krajmir)
- Damnjan (or Damjan)
- Vidoslav
- Dabiživ
- Rusin
- Oliver

Court offices
First	despot of Stefan Dušan; 1346–? Served alongside: Simeon Uroš and Jovan Asen	Succeeded by Dejan as despot of Uroš V
First	sevastokrator of Stefan Dušan before 1346	Succeeded by Dejan and Branko
Preceded by Gradislav Vojšić as čelnik	veliki čelnik of Stefan Dušan before 1340–before 1349	Succeeded by Dimitrije
Military offices
Vacant Title last held by Novak Grebostrek	veliki vojvoda of Stefan Dušan fl. 1341–1355; Served alongside: Nikola Stanjević	Succeeded by Jovan Uglješa as veliki vojvoda of Uroš V

== Sources ==
- Fine, John Van Antwerp (1994), The Late Medieval Balkans: A Critical Survey from the Late Twelfth Century to the Ottoman Conquest, University of Michigan Press, ISBN 978-0-472-08260-5
- Pirivatrić Srđan (2013). "The Byzantine titles of Jovan Oliver: A contribution to the issues of their origin and chronology". Zbornik radova Vizantološkog instituta. 50 (2): 713–724. doi:10.2298/ZRVI1350713P. hdl:21.15107/rcub_dais_6324.
