= Stanislav (čelnik) =

Stanislav (Serbian Cyrillic: Станислав; fl. 1377) was a čelnik in the service of the Serbian magnate family of Dejanović. He was from Štip, where he is known to have lived in 1377. His son, Milorad Repoš, was mentioned in the charter of Konstantin Dejanović dated 26 March 1388. It is possible that logotet Stanislav and čelnik were the same person. The name "Repoš" seems to have been a surname.
