= Krajmir =

Serbian nobleman

Krajmir (Serbian Cyrillic: Крајмир; d. 15 June 1389) was a Serbian nobleman who served Prince Lazar (r. 1373–89), with the title of vojvoda (general). He was mentioned in Konstantin Mihailović's memoirs (1490–1501) regarding the Battle of Kosovo (1389), where he was captured and killed together with Lazar by the Ottomans, in front of Bayezid. He was described as being from Toplica. His person has been connected with Krajko, the son of magnate Jovan Oliver (1310–1356). It is likely that he is the same as Milan Toplica from folk tradition.

== See also ==
- Pavle Orlović
- Ivan Kosančić
- Miloš Obilić

== Sources ==
- Đerić, Branislav (1989). Kosovska bitka: vojno-istorijska rasprava. Naučna knjiga. ISBN 9788623020070.
- Rade Mihaljčić (1989). Junaci kosovske legende. Beogradski izdavačko-grafički zavod. ISBN 9788613003489.
- Petar Tomac (1968). Kosovska bitka. Vojnoizdavački zavod. pp. 130, 164, 208.
