= Zemen Monastery =

Coordinates: 42°28′3″N 22°44′18″E

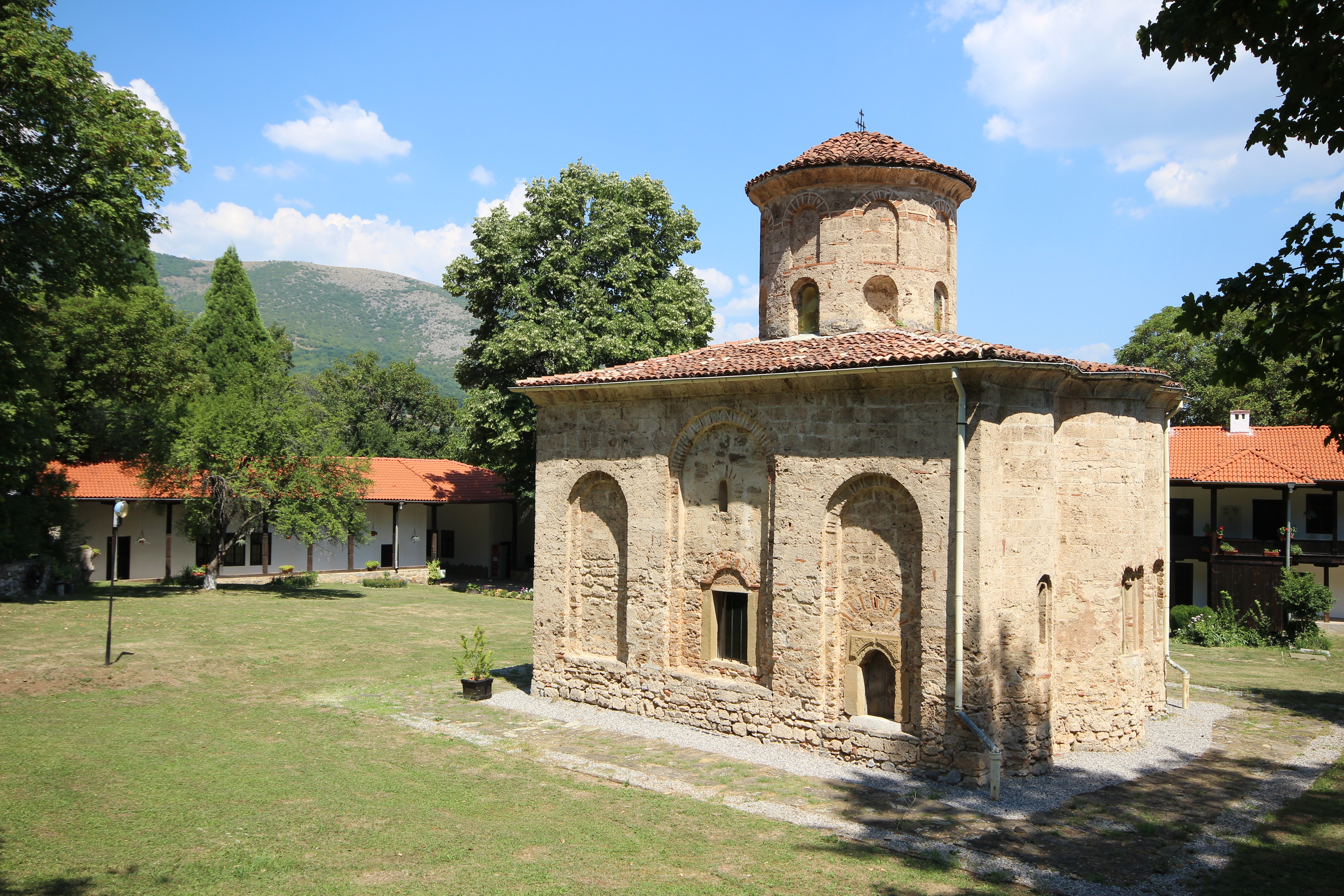
The 11th-century church (katholikon) of the Zemen Monastery

The Zemen Monastery (Bulgarian: Земенски манастир, Zemenski manastir) is a Bulgarian Orthodox monastery located one kilometre away from the town of Zemen, Pernik Province in western Bulgaria.

The monastery was established in the 11th century. It comprises a church, belfry and two residential buildings. It is currently uninhabited. The church is a monument of culture.

In 1334, Serbian despot Dejan, donated funds to redecorate the monastery church. The church has a cruciform dome and three apses. The present dome was built during the 19th century when the church was restored after lying in ruins for many years. During the middle of the 19th century, living quarters for monks were also constructed. When the Ottoman Empire fell in 1878, a small bell tower was added to the monastery complex. There are still a few elements left in the church that date to the 12th century. It is possible to discern from these the subjects of some extant frescoes – The Refusal of Offerings Made by Joachim and Anna, as well as the face of what may be an Old Testament king – David or Solomon – or an image of Saints Constantine and Elena. Also preserved are portraits of the church's founders, despot Dejan and his wife Teodora-Evdokija, which date from the 14th century. All of the church frescoes have been restored.

== Gallery ==
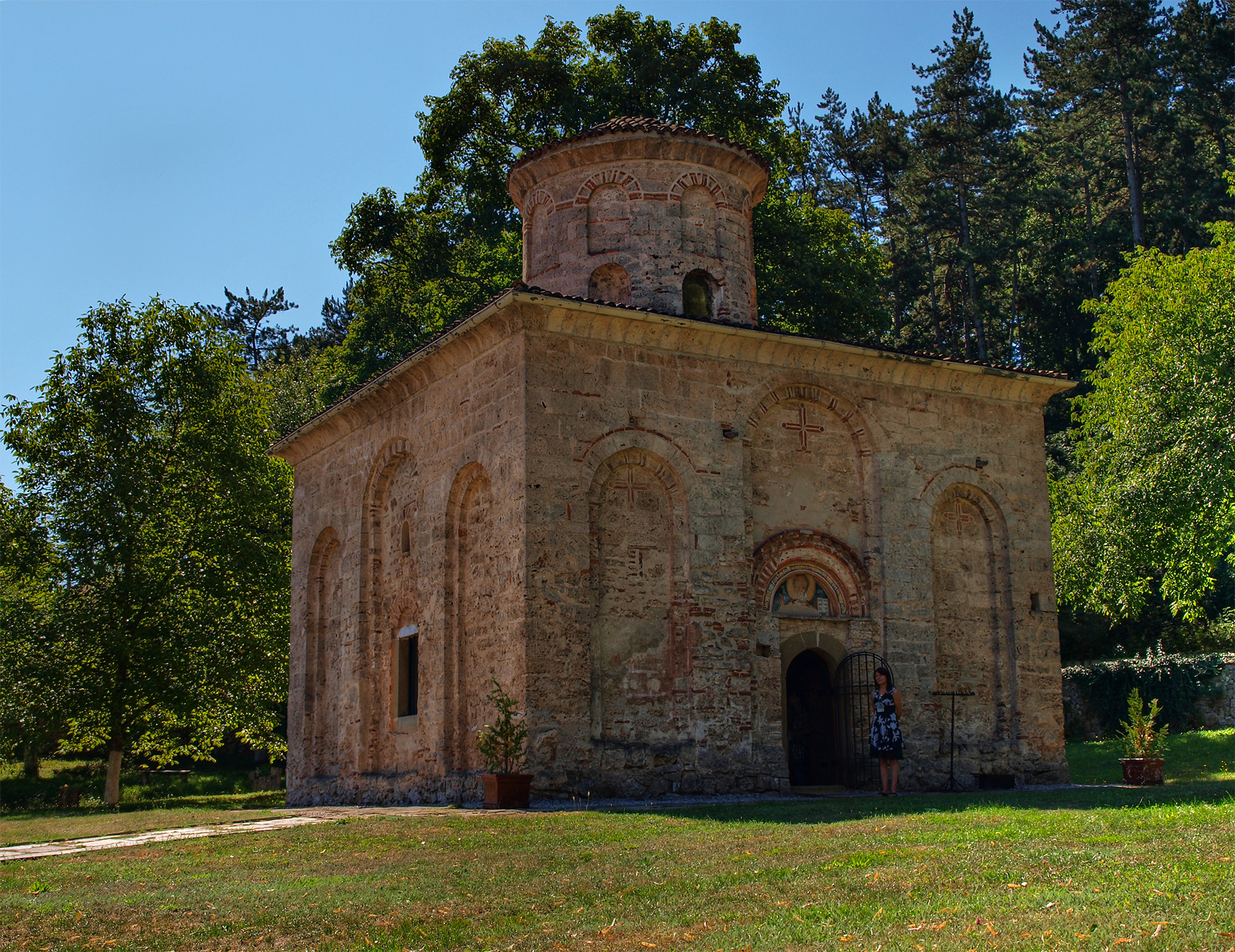
Front view of the church

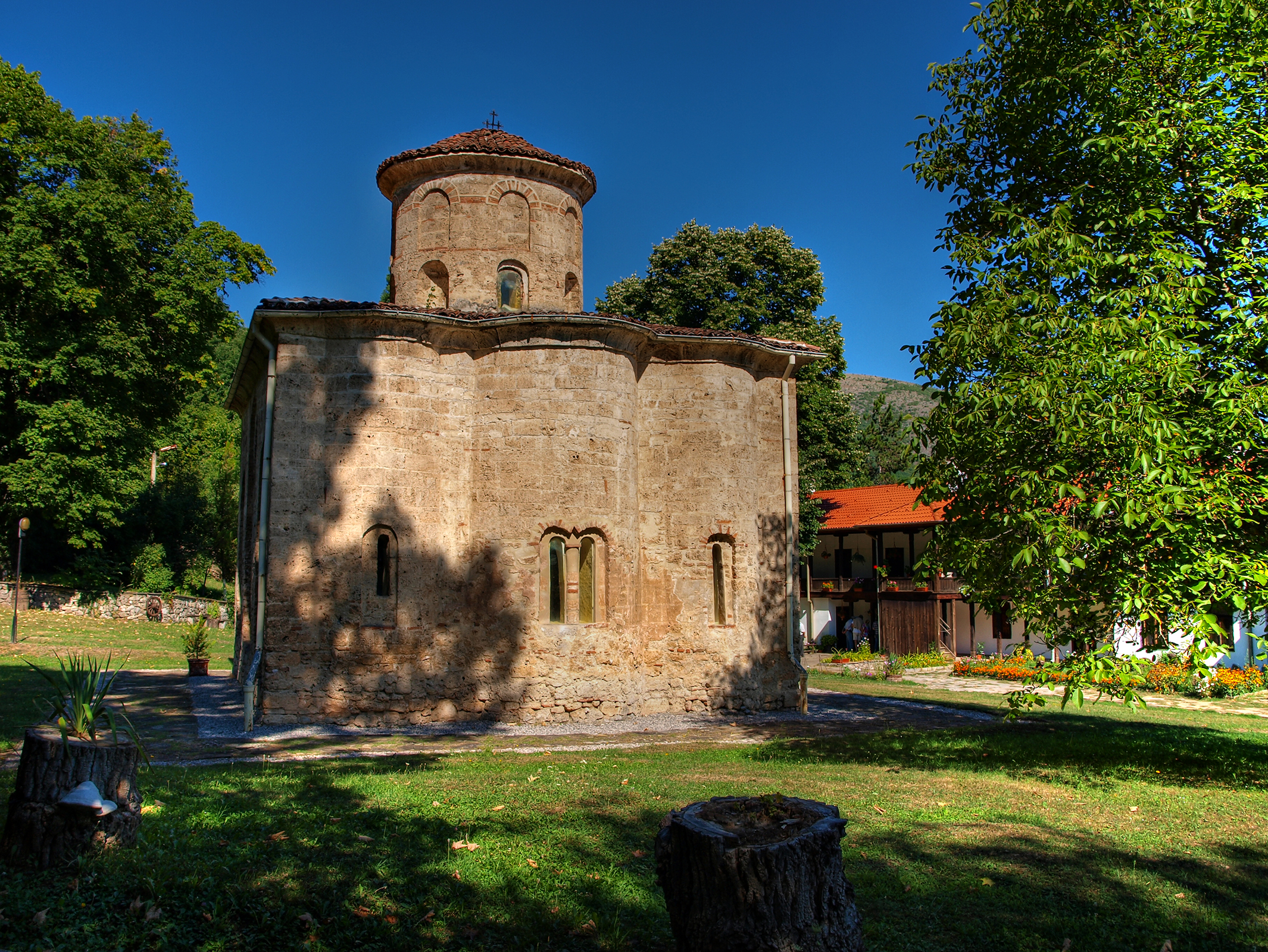
Apse view of the church

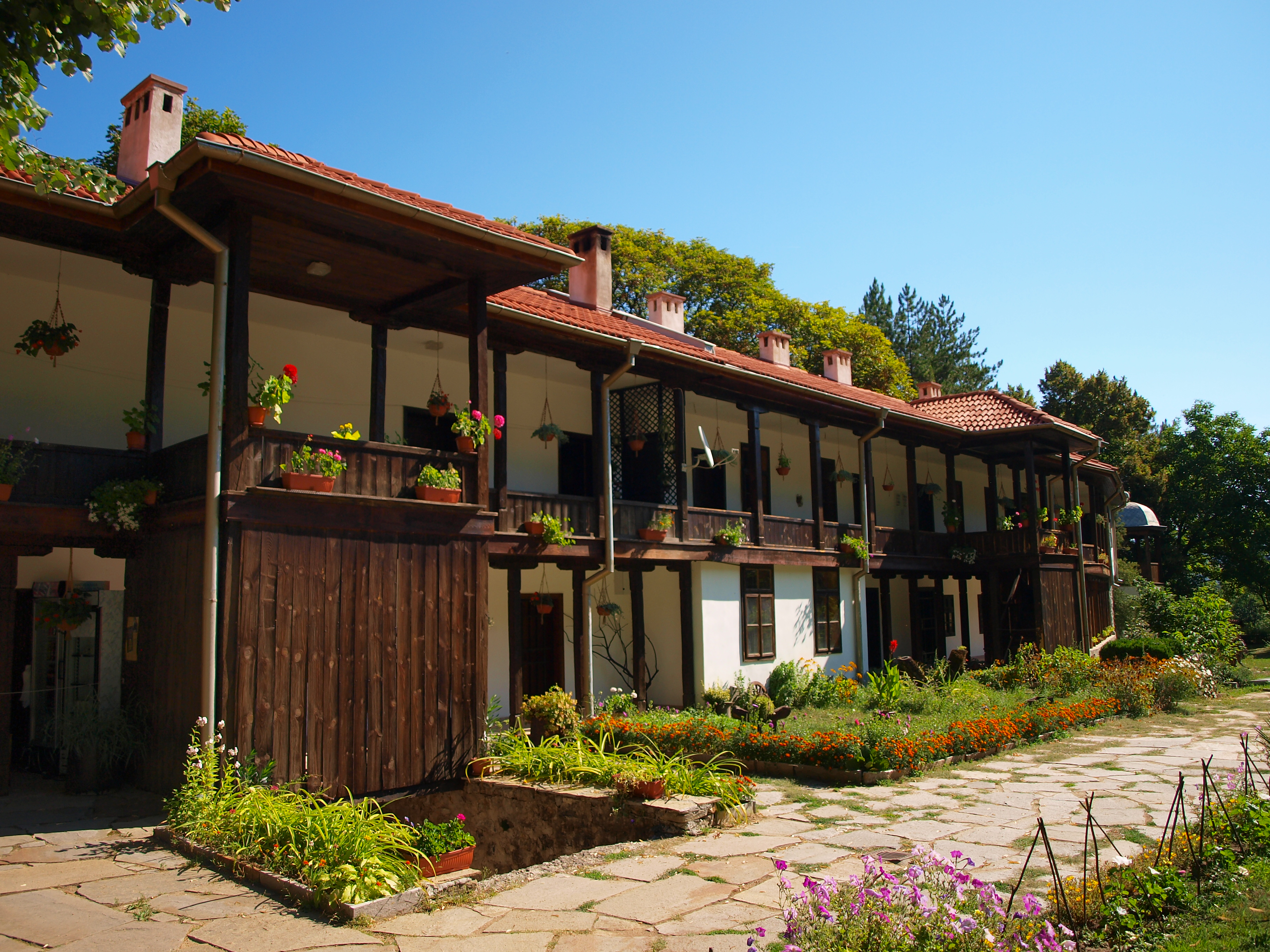
Courtyard and 19th-century residential buildings

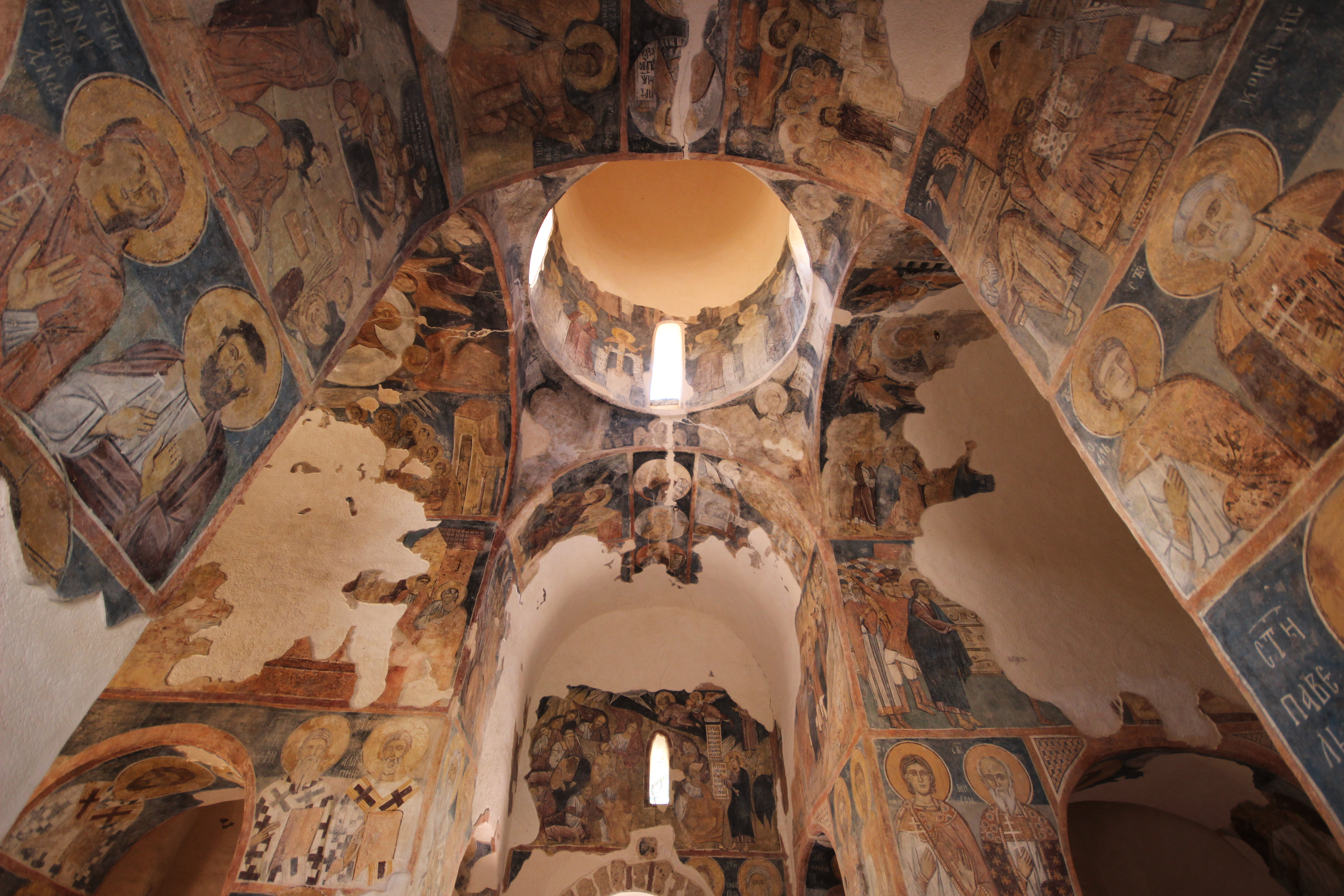
Medieval frescoes in the Zemen moneastery

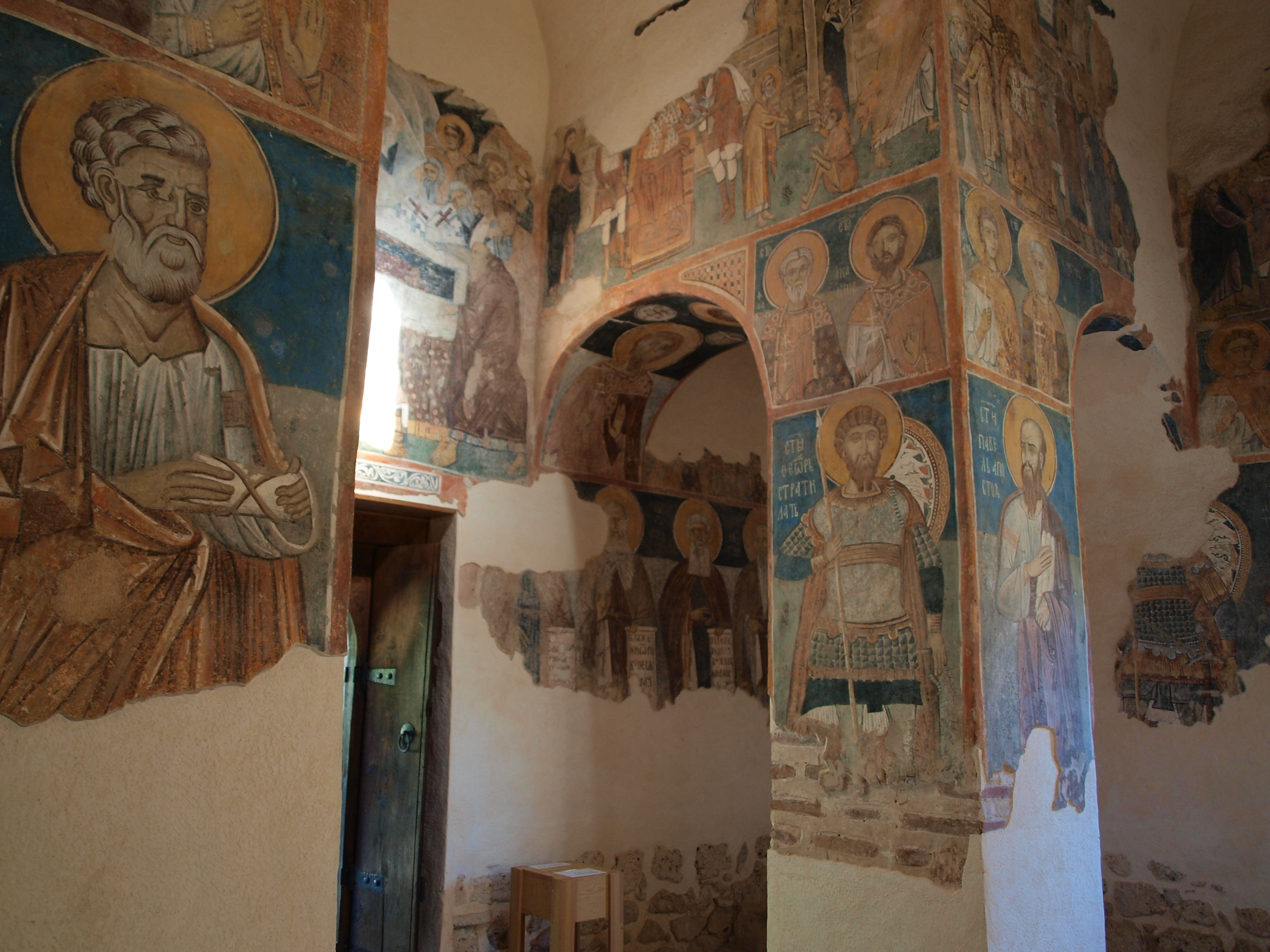
Interior view of the church with its medieval frescoes

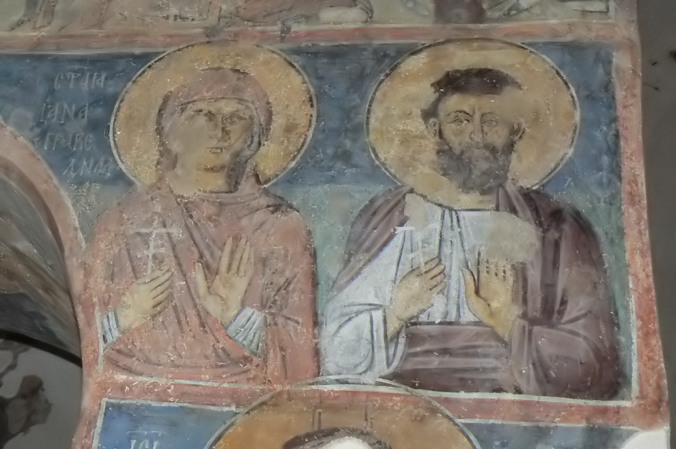
14th-century fresco of Joachim and Anne
