= Repoš =

Repoš (Serbian Cyrillic: Репош) was a name found in medieval Serbia; it was mentioned in 14th-century charters as a byname (or surname), and in the early 15th century as a given name.

- Milorad Repoš (fl. 1388), son of Serbian nobleman Stanislav (fl. 1377). Mentioned in the charter of Konstantin Dejanović dated 26 March 1388.
- Đurađ Repoš
- Reposh Kastrioti, an Albanian nobleman and brother of the Albanian nobleman Skanderbeg (1405–1468).
