= Endowment (philosophy) =

Endowment is a concept in philosophy that refers to human capacities and abilities which can be naturally or socially acquired. Natural endowment is biologically analysed. It is examined through individual genes or inborn abilities. Social endowment is explored through the culture and ethics of human lives in their communities.

Natural and social endowment can be used to explain the behaviour of individuals. This natural and social distinction exemplifies individuals' positions within communities. The differences in human capacities enables diverse perceptions towards a similar situation. This includes Stephen Covey's human endowments, which are self-awareness, imagination, willpower, abundance mentality, courage, creativity, and self-renewal.

The philosophical studies of human nature or endowment is outlined in the theories of medieval philosophers on human evolution such as; Jean-Jacques Rousseau, Aristotle, and Baruch Spinoza.

== Description ==
Endowment in philosophical terms encompasses human innate and acquired capacities. The disciplinary focus of philosophy on human capacities is inclusive in the ontological studies of human nature. The innate and learned human capacities reflects the intrinsic lives and realities of human beings .

Endowment, either innate or acquired, varies among individuals and societies. Each individual consists of their own body and mind from birth until they become socially incorporated in communities where culture is learned and communal living is inevitable. This enables people to live together despite their different set of innate capacities. The necessity of living together as groups in order to thrive is part of individuals' acquired capacities.

The epistemological nature of human endowment can be explored through the state of nature theory with the focus on self-interested individuals and the creation of states. Human endowment is also inclusive in the theories of human nature exploring individuals' rational and social behaviours.

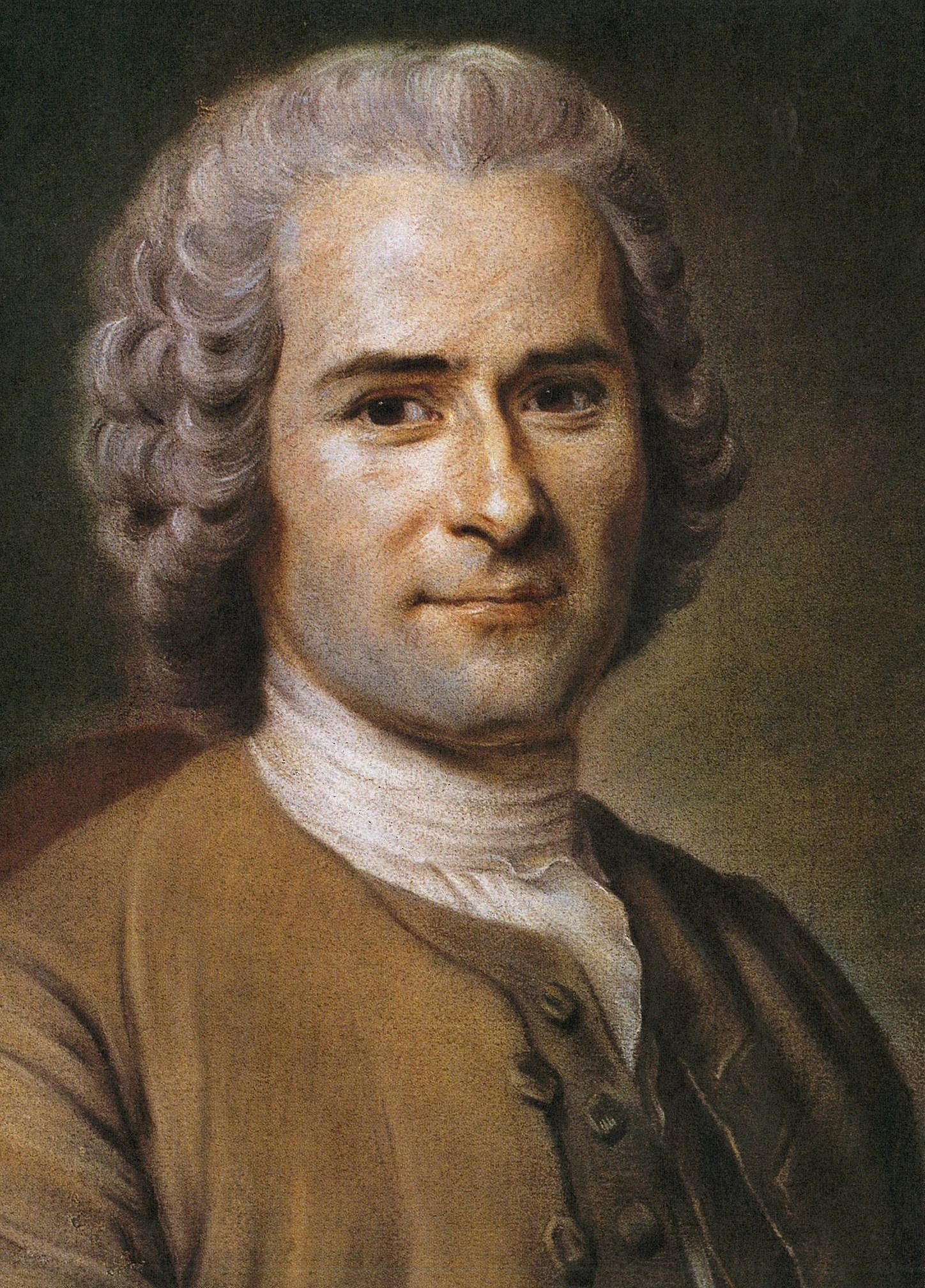
Jean-Jacques Rousseau (Medieval Philosophers)

== History ==
In-depth analysis of human endowment is attributed to theories and perceptions of human evolution.

The biological and cultural evolution is an ongoing process that shapes similarities and distinctive human attributes. Biological and cultural evolution coexist to influence human activities. Biological evolution is determined by genes or hereditary, which naturally gives individuals the ability to speak the language of their associated communities. Cultural evolution is the process where beliefs and a community's way of living is passed down to generations which includes their spoken language.

The state of nature by Rousseau offers an understanding of self-preservation as the main innate human capacity. Natural human endowment is peoples' willingness to survive and enjoy life. This allows the existence of states which individuals have formulated in order to live peacefully and ensure their continual survival.

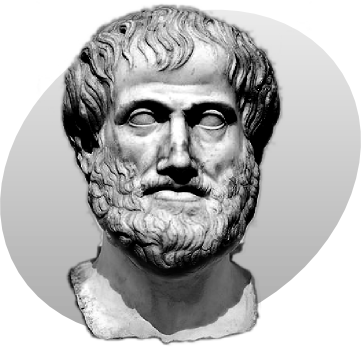
Aristotle (Ancient Greek Philosopher)

Aristotle's human nature focuses on rationality as an innate human capacity that enables them to form communities and states. Aristotle shows the natural existence of communities and states due to individuals' innate capacities to live together. Living in communities reflects the differences between humans' innate abilities. This includes the innate abilities towards political participation between male and female.

Human endowment is considered to be of divine nature according to Spinoza. Divine nature is reference to God's influence on human actions. The natural capacities of people to realise what they need enables them to make reasonable decisions and act accordingly. Spinoza's idea of necessity as part of human endowment is connected to God or nature which is the only existing substance.

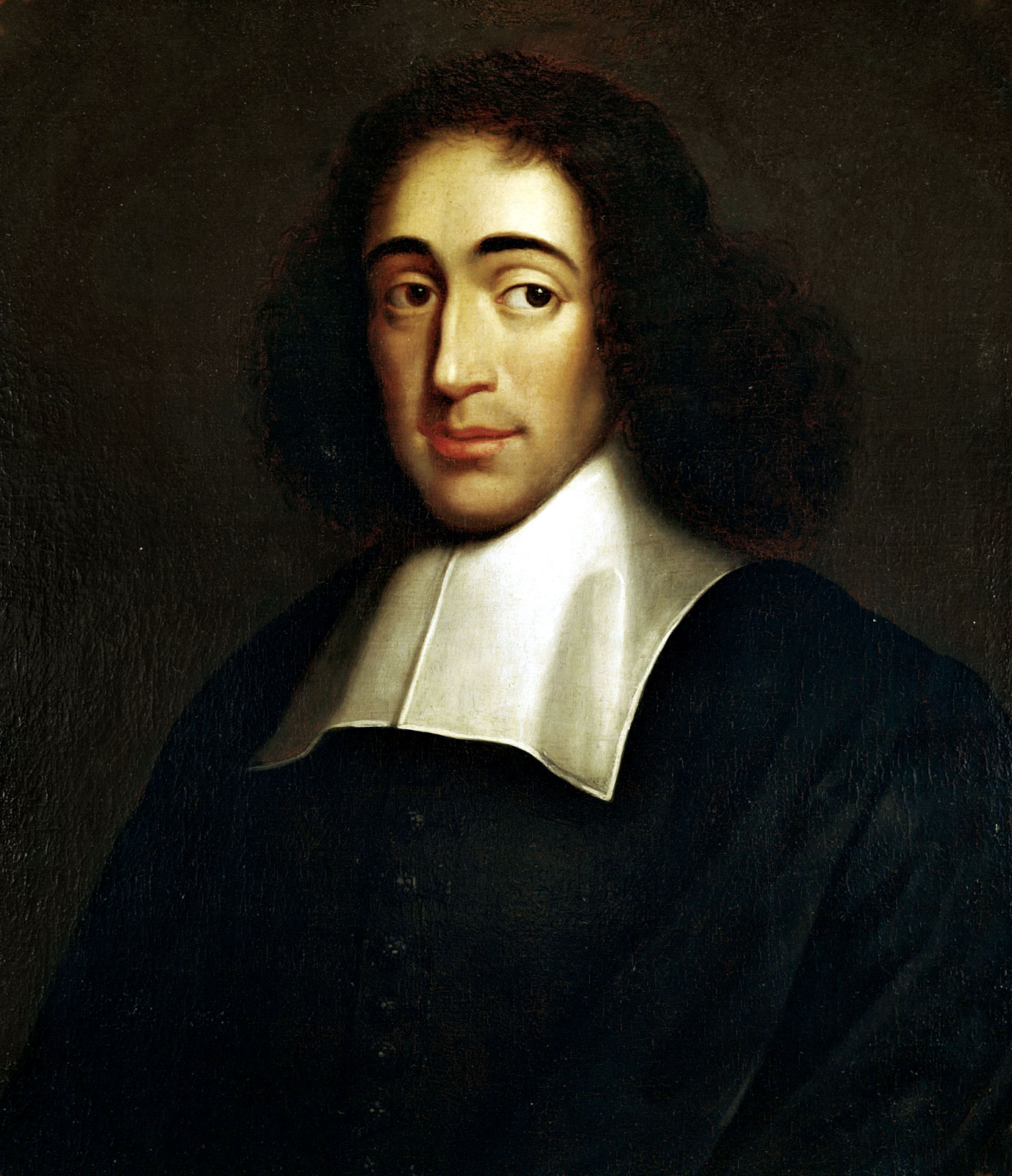
Baruch Spinoza (Medieval Philosopher)

Stephen Covey's human endowment is divided into primary and secondary categories. Primary endowment includes; self-awareness, imagination, conscience, volition or will power. Secondary endowments are; abundance mentality, courage and consideration, creativity, and self-renewal. These endowments are explored through the stages of human life which are dependence, independence, and interdependence. Covey's list of human endowment distinguishes between principles and values. Principles are external natural laws that determines the consequences of individual behaviour caused by their internal values. Principles are attributes of acquired or learned human endowment while values are of innate human capacities.

== Natural endowment ==
Endowment in the natural category refers to innate capacities of human beings which they are born with.

Humans' instinct nature to preserve themselves is considered a natural endowment under Rousseau's state of nature theory. Individuals without having to acquire any instinctual value have the ability of wanting security to ensure their survival. The natural capacities of individuals to thrive and survive stems unilaterally from human mind rather than a polity. Natural endowment includes individuals' natural rights that allow humans' to be rational without any form of law in place. This differentiates natural endowment from social endowment.

Aristotle focuses on reason and mind as part of human natural endowment. Individuals are born with the natural ability to think, which enables them to make rational decisions. Individuals, through their minds and reason, develop abilities which could become habits if they continue to be rational. Aristotle's political perceptions of human nature reflect the idea of unequal natural abilities between genders. This is due to the level of authority individuals have in expressing their innate cognitive faculties.

Baruch Spinoza builds on individuals' natural impulses as innate capacities which is from the recognition of what is necessary and nature itself. Humans natural capacities include the innate ability to realise what is necessary and act through reasoning and make decisions. This stems from humans' dependency as part of their innate capacities which cannot be separated from nature or God. The social construction of communities and states is a result of individuals' realisation that living together in a civilised manner is necessary for survival.

Stephen Covey's primary endowment includes; self-awareness or self-conscious and imagination as part of humans' natural endowment. Self-awareness or self-conscious is the innate capacity of human beings to be more sensitive of their environment with what they encounter and experience. Individuals' have the natural ability to act reasonably towards certain situations as they know what the situation is and its consequences. Imagination is of individual minds where thoughts beyond real life occurrences and situations take place. Individuals make sense of their environment and world through their natural ability to imagine beyond reality.

== Social endowment ==
Human endowment is social when they are acquired or learned from an environment. These learned characteristics varies between individuals and societies.

Social endowment includes conscience as part of individuals' learned ability to distinguish between what is right and wrong. This moral decision is a reflection of rules and laws in place to govern a certain group people or society. Individuals develop conscience from their cultures or the way of life within their communities. This differentiates peoples' reactions to certain situations they encounter and experience. The uneven structures and material distribution of goods and services within societies determines individuals' conscience. Individuals who are most vulnerable and make up most of the lower class in society develop a more self-motivated and determined conscience. This social endowment is a reflection of individuals' environment and their corresponding response to it.

Social endowment emerges from these communal societies with embedded rules that govern people. The set of rules in place is a result of social endowment where individuals distinguishes between acceptable and inappropriate behaviour.

The theory of human nature by Aristotle includes the philosophy of both natural and social human endowment. Social endowment flows from the natural capacities of people like their ability to think and make rational decisions. The gathering of communities and establishing of states are a result of rational decisions people make. This reflects the idea that humans are rational social and political animals. Individuals' social ability to think and make moral decisions allows them to live together in a polity. Living in a polity requires individuals to follow certain rules and way of life which becomes part of their social endowment. Sanctions are in place to correspond governing rules and ensure the maintenance of the polity.
