= Jovan Dragaš =

Serbian noble

- despot
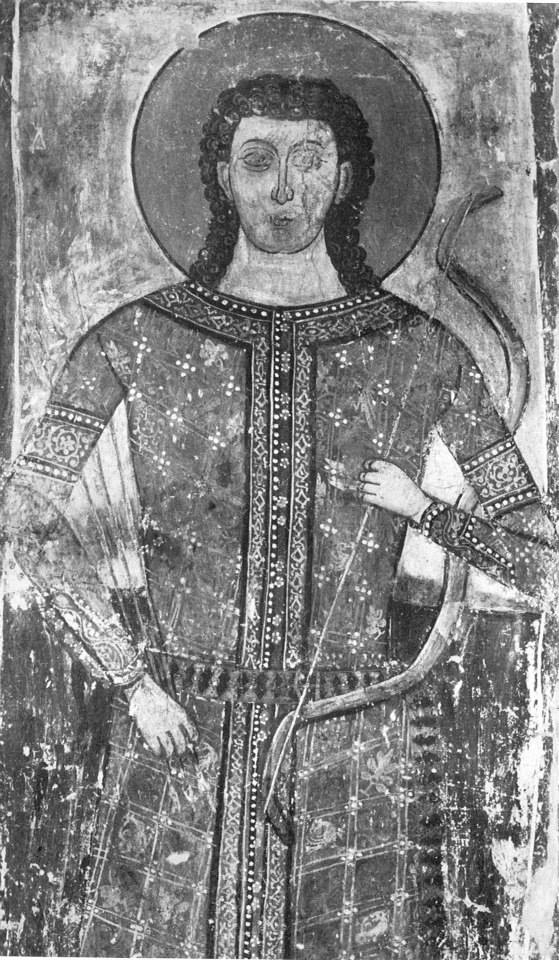
- Fresco depicting Jovan Dragaš, from Beluća monastery
- Reign: 1371–1378
- Successor: Konstantin Dejanović
- Died: 1378
- Father: Dejan
- Mother: Theodora Nemanjić

Jovan Dejanović (Serbian Cyrillic: Јован Дејановић), known as Jovan Dragaš (Јован Драгаш), was a Serbian nobleman who held the title of despot under the Serbian Emperor Uroš V, his cousin. He later became an Ottoman vassal after the Battle of Maritsa in 1371.

His father, despot Dejan ruled Kumanovo with a district spanning from Preševo to Velbazhd (Kyustendil). After his father's death, the young brothers Jovan and Constantine were taken care of by Vlatko Paskačić, at the order of the Mrnjavčevićs, who continued to rule the region until Jovan reached adolescence.

He began his office in circa 1365, and ruled alongside his mother and younger brother Constantine for some years. His cousin gave him the title of Despot, as had done his father before him (this is attested in sources dating to 1373).

Ottoman sources report that in 1373, the Ottoman army compelled Jovan (who they called Saruyar) in the upper Struma, to recognize Ottoman vassalage.

After the Battle of Maritsa, the two brothers became Ottoman vassals as the Mrnjavčevićs were defeated. They, however, continued to rule their region as a semi-independent state, and managed to further expand their father's district, taking territory from Jovan Oliver. He issued coins that were of same design as those of Vukašin Mrnjavčević.

He donated the St. Basil's church in Štip to the Hilandar monastery.

He died in 1378 and his brother continued to rule until 1395.

== See also ==
- Fall of the Serbian Empire

== Sources ==
- Bataković, Dušan T., ed. (2005). Histoire du peuple serbe [History of the Serbian People] (in French). Lausanne: L’Age d’Homme.
- Ćirković, Sima (2004). The Serbs. Malden: Blackwell Publishing.
- Fine, John Van Antwerp Jr. (1994) [1987]. The Late Medieval Balkans: A Critical Survey from the Late Twelfth Century to the Ottoman Conquest. Ann Arbor, Michigan: University of Michigan Press.
- Nicol, Donald M. (1993) [1972]. The Last Centuries of Byzantium, 1261-1453 (2. ed.). Cambridge: Cambridge University Press.
- Palairet, Michael (2015). Macedonia: A Voyage through History. Vol. 1. Cambridge Scholars Publishing.
- Soulis, George Christos (1984). The Serbs and Byzantium during the reign of Tsar Stephen Dušan (1331-1355) and his successors. Washington: Dumbarton Oaks Library and Collection.
