= Arhiljevica =

Lost medieval village and monastery

Arhiljevica (Serbian Cyrillic: Архиљевица) is the name of a lost medieval village and monastery (dedicated to the "Holy Mother of God") which existed during the Serbian Empire and its aftermath. It was in the possession of the Dejanović noble family. Based on Emperor Stefan Dušan's charter dating to 10 August 1354, Arhiljevica was situated where the granted villages of Podlešane, Izvor and Rućinci lay, on the slopes of Jezer (Kumanovska Crna Gora). The fact that Dejan built Arhiljevica rather than renovating it is evidence of his economic strength.
