= Maria Palaiologina, Queen of Serbia =

Maria Palaiologina

Queen consort of Serbia
- Tenure: 1324–1331
- Died: 7 April 1355
- Burial: Skopje
- Spouse: Stefan Dečanski
- Issue: Simeon Uroš; Jelena Nemanjić Šubić; Theodora Nemanjić
- House: Palaiologos
- Father: John Palaiologos
- Mother: Irene Metochitissa
- Religion: Eastern Orthodoxy

Maria Palaiologina (Serbian: Марија Палеолог / Marija Paleolog) was the Queen consort of Stefan Dečanski (1324–1331). Maria was the daughter of panhypersebastos John Palaiologos, and great-niece of Emperor Andronikos II Palaiologos (r. 1282–1328).

Her father was the governor of Thessaloniki in the early 1320s. Stefan Uroš III had earlier been married to Teodora of Bulgaria, but the marriage ended in with Theodora's death on 20 December 1322. Uroš III then married Maria in 1324. The royal couple's marriage lasted until her husband's death. Stefan Uroš III was defeated by his son Stephen Uroš IV Dušan (from the marriage with Teodora) in 1331, and shortly thereafter died in Zvečan (1332).

The relation between the father and son had been bad, the usurpation was incited by the "younger" nobility. Maria tried to assert the throne for her son Simeon Uroš, through Byzantine aid, but this was unsuccessful. Dušan the Mighty did not harm their family, Maria took monastic vows as Marta, and in 1348, Simeon became a governor of the southern provinces of the Serbian Empire. Maria died on April 7, 1355, and was buried in Skopje. A brief account of her turbulent life inscribed on her gravestone is attributed to her.

== Family ==
Maria had son and two daughters by her marriage with Stefan Uroš III:

- Simeon Uroš, rival Emperor of Serbs and Greeks in the southern half of the Serbian Empire (r. 1359 - 1370)
- Jelena Nemanjić Šubić
- Teodora-Evdokija

=== Ancestry ===
Ancestors of Maria Palaiologina, Queen of Serbia

16. Andronikos Palaiologos, megas domestikos
8. Michael VIII Palaiologos
17. Theodora Angelina
4. Constantine Palaiologos, porphyrogénnētos
18. John Doukas Vatatzes
9. Theodora Doukaina Vatatzaina
19. Eudokia Angelina
2. John Palaiologos
20. Alexios Raoul, protovestiarios
10. John Raoul Petraliphas, protovestiarios
21. Vatatzaina
5. Irene Raoulaina
22. John Kantakouzenos, doux
11. Theodora Palaiologina Kantakouzene
23. Irene Komnene Palaiologina
1. Maria Palaiologina
12. George Metochites
6. Theodore Metochites, megas logothetes
3. Irene Metochitissa

== See also ==
- Nemanjić dynasty

== Sources ==
- Fine, John Van Antwerp (1994). The Late Medieval Balkans: A Critical Survey from the Late Twelfth Century to the Ottoman Conquest. University of Michigan Press. ISBN 978-0-472-08260-5.
- Živković, Vojislav (2021). "Maria Paleolog, wife of Stefan Dečanski". Vizantijsko-slovenska čtenija (in Serbian). 4: 111–125.

Royal titles
Preceded by Theodora Smilets	Queen consort of Serbia; 1324–1331	Succeeded by Jelena Sratsimirova
