= Teodora-Evdokija =

Teodora-Evdokija Теодора-Евдокија
- Despotess of Kumanovo
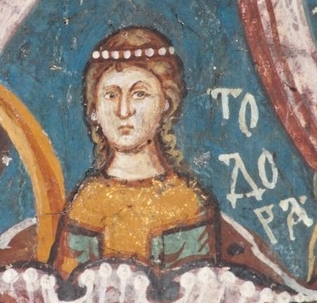
- Fresco painting of Teodora, from Visoki Dečani monastery (UNESCO)
- Born: 1330
- Died: after 1381
- Despot Dejan
- Issue: Jovan Dragaš; Teodora Dragaš; Constantine Dragaš
- House: Nemanjić
- Father: Stephen Uroš III Dečanski of Serbia
- Mother: Maria Palaiologina
- Religion: Serbian Orthodox

Teodora Nemanjić (also Theodora) (Serbian Cyrillic: Теодора Немањић; 1330 – after 1381) was the despotess of Kumanovo as the wife of Despot Dejan (fl. 1355). She was the daughter of King Stefan Dečanski and her eldest half-brother was Serbian emperor, Stefan Dušan. She was the mother of two sons, Constantine Dragaš and Jovan Dragaš, and one daughter. She later became a nun adopting the name Evdokija (Евдокија, gr. Eudokia), hence she is known in historiography as Teodora-Evdokija (Теодора-Евдокија).

== Family ==
Theodora was born in 1330, the youngest daughter and child of King Stefan Dečanski of Serbia by his second wife, Maria Palaiologina. Her maternal grandparents were John Komnenos Palaiologos, Governor of Thessaloniki and Irene Metochitissa. Theodora had one full brother, Simeon Uroš and a sister, Jelena; she also had two half-siblings from her father's first marriage to Teodora of Bulgaria, Queen of Serbia, Stefan Uroš Dušan and Dušica. When Theodora was a year old, at the insistence of the nobility, Stefan Uroš Dušan had their father deposed and imprisoned in chains. He consequently usurped the Serbian throne as Stefan Uroš IV Dušan. Five years later, Theodora's father was murdered by strangulation. Her mother unsuccessfully attempted to obtain the crown for Simeon; defeated in her efforts, she retired to a convent and died in 1355.

== Marriage ==
In 1347, at 17 years of age, Teodora married Despot Dejan. He was granted the title of sebastokrator by her brother, Dušan. Sometime after her marriage a fresco painting of Teodora was executed at the Serbian Orthodox Christian monastery of Visoki Dečani. Teodora and Dejan had three children:

- Jovan Dragaš (dead in 1378);
- Teodora Dragaš. In 1355 she married Žarko, lord of Zeta, and had a son, Mrkša Žarković. After widowed, she married Đurađ I Balšić.
- Constantine Dragaš (dead in 1395). He married an unknown woman and had four daughters, among them Helena Dragaš (mother of the last two Byzantine emperors), and a son. After being widowed, he married the Byzantine princess Eudokia of Trebizond, without issue.

== Religious life ==
On an unrecorded date, Theodora followed in her mother's footsteps and also entered a religious life. Her mother had taken the name Marta, and Teodora, upon becoming a nun, adopted the name Eudokia. In a charter dated 1379, it was recorded that Eudocia imperatrix et filius Constantinus donated property to the Chilandar Monastery.

== Ancestry ==
Ancestors of Teodora-Evdokija

8. Stephen Uroš I of Serbia
4. Stephen Uroš II Milutin of Serbia
9. Helen of Anjou
2. Stephen Uroš III Dečanski of Serbia
10. George I Terter of Bulgaria
5. Anna Terter of Bulgaria
11. Kira Maria Asenina of Bulgaria
1. Theodora Nemanjić
12. Constantine Palaiologos, porphyrogénnētos
6. John Palaiologos, despotes in Macedonia
13. Irene Raoulaina
3. Maria Palaiologina
14. Theodore Metochites, megas logothetis
7. Irene Metochitissa

== See also ==
- Eudokia Angelina (Evdokija Anđel), Grand Princess of Serbia 1196-1198
