= Konstantin Dejanović =

14th-century Serbian nobleman

Konstantin Dejanović Константин Драгаш Дејановић
- Gospodin - Lord (possibly Despot)
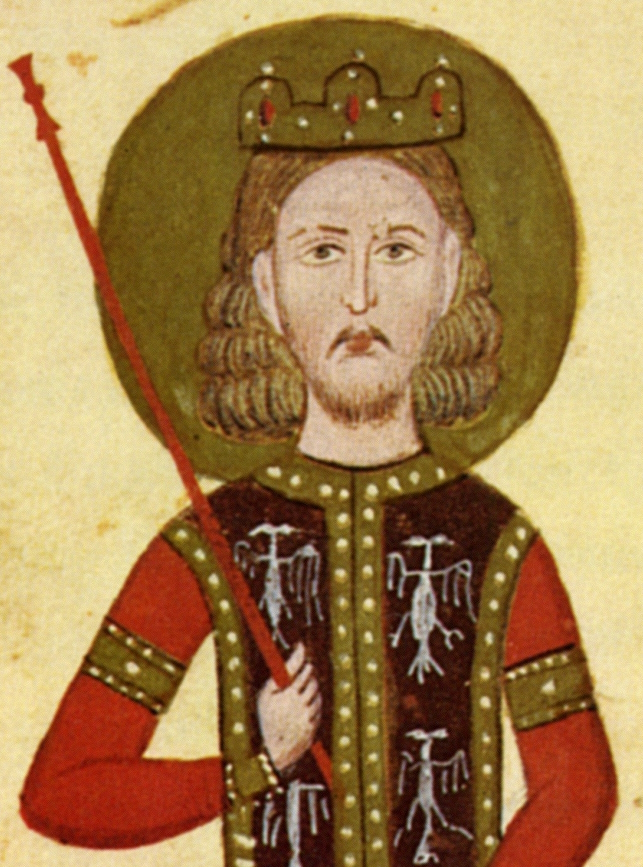
- Icon depicting Serbian Despot Konstantin Dejanović (c. 1371)
- Reign: 1378–1395
- Predecessor: Jovan Dragaš
- Born: before 1355
- Died: 17 May 1395; Rovine, Romania
- Spouses: First wife (unknown) Eudokia of Trebizond (m. 1387)
- Issue: first marriage Helena Dragases; Three daughters Jakov
- Father: Dejan
- Mother: Theodora Nemanjić

Konstantin (Kostadin) Dejanović (Serbian Cyrillic: Константин (Костадин) Дејановић; fl. 1365–1395) or Konstantin Dragaš was a Serbian magnate that ruled a large province in eastern Macedonia under Ottoman suzerainty, during the fall of the Serbian Empire. He succeeded his older brother Jovan Dragaš, who had been an Ottoman vassal since the Battle of Maritsa (1371) which had devastated part of the Serbian nobility. The brothers had their own government and minted coins according to the Nemanjić style. His daughter Jelena married Byzantine Emperor Manuel II Palaiologos in 1392. He fell at the Battle of Rovine (17 May 1395), serving the Ottomans against Wallachia, fighting alongside Serbian magnates Stefan Lazarević and Marko Mrnjavčević.

Konstantin's grandson, last Roman Emperor Constantine XI, was named after him, and even used the name Dragaš.

== Life ==
=== Early ===
Konstantin's father was the despot and sevastokrator Dejan, who had held the Kumanovo-region under the rule of Stefan Dušan (r. 1331–1355). Konstantin's mother Teodora Nemanjić was a half-sister of Dušan. His maternal grandparents were King Stefan Dečanski (r. 1321–1331) and Queen Maria Palaiologina.

=== Reign ===
In around 1365, Dejanović's older brother Jovan Dragaš was holding Štip and Strumica. Jovan was elevated to despot by Emperor Uroš V (before 1373), as Emperor Dušan had elevated Dejan, their father. Ottoman sources report that in 1373, the Ottoman army compelled "Saruyar" (Jovan Dragaš) in the upper Struma, to recognize Ottoman vassalship. Konstantin had helped Jovan in ruling the lands, and when Jovan died in 1378/1379, Konstantin succeeded, subsequently managing to govern large portions of northeastern Macedonia and the Struma valley.

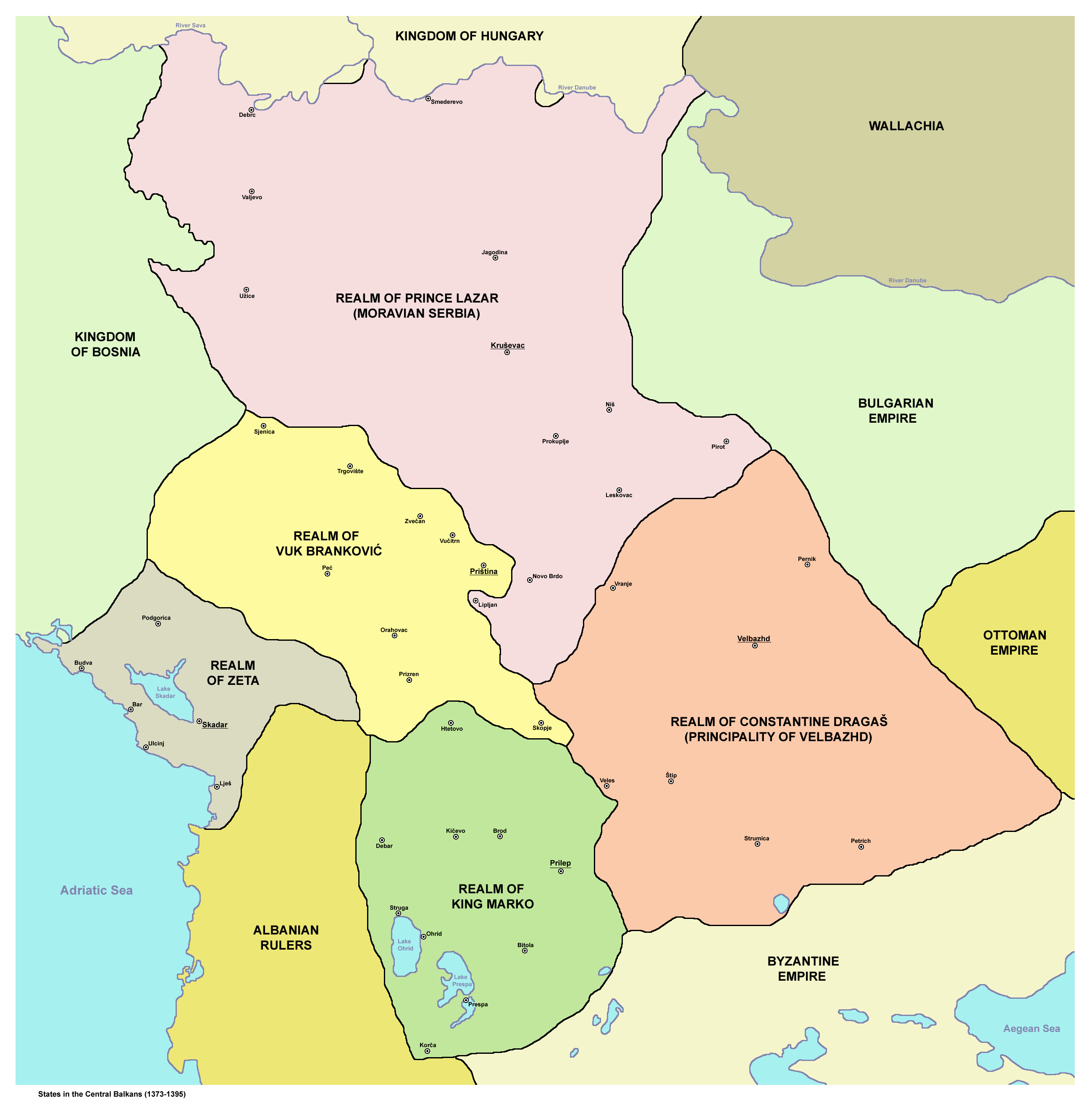
States in the Central Balkans, including Konstantin's province (1373–1395).

He minted coins, as had his brother done. The Dragaš family generously donated to several monasteries on Mount Athos, including Hilandar, Pantaleimon (Rossikon) and Vatopédi.

On 10 February 1392 Dejanović's daughter Jelena married Manuel II Palaiologos. The next day, they were crowned Emperor and Empress by the patriarch.

After the battle of Maritsa, they were forced to become vassals of the Ottoman Empire, but they maintained close links with their Christian neighbors, including the Byzantine Empire. In 1395, together with his neighbor and ally, the Serbian king of Prilep Marko, Konstantin Dragaš was killed fighting for their Ottoman overlord Sultan Bayezid I against Mircea cel Bătrân of Wallachia at Rovine, near Craiova. The Ottomans named Konstantin's capital Velbužd after him, Köstendil (now Bulgarian Kyustendil).

== Family ==
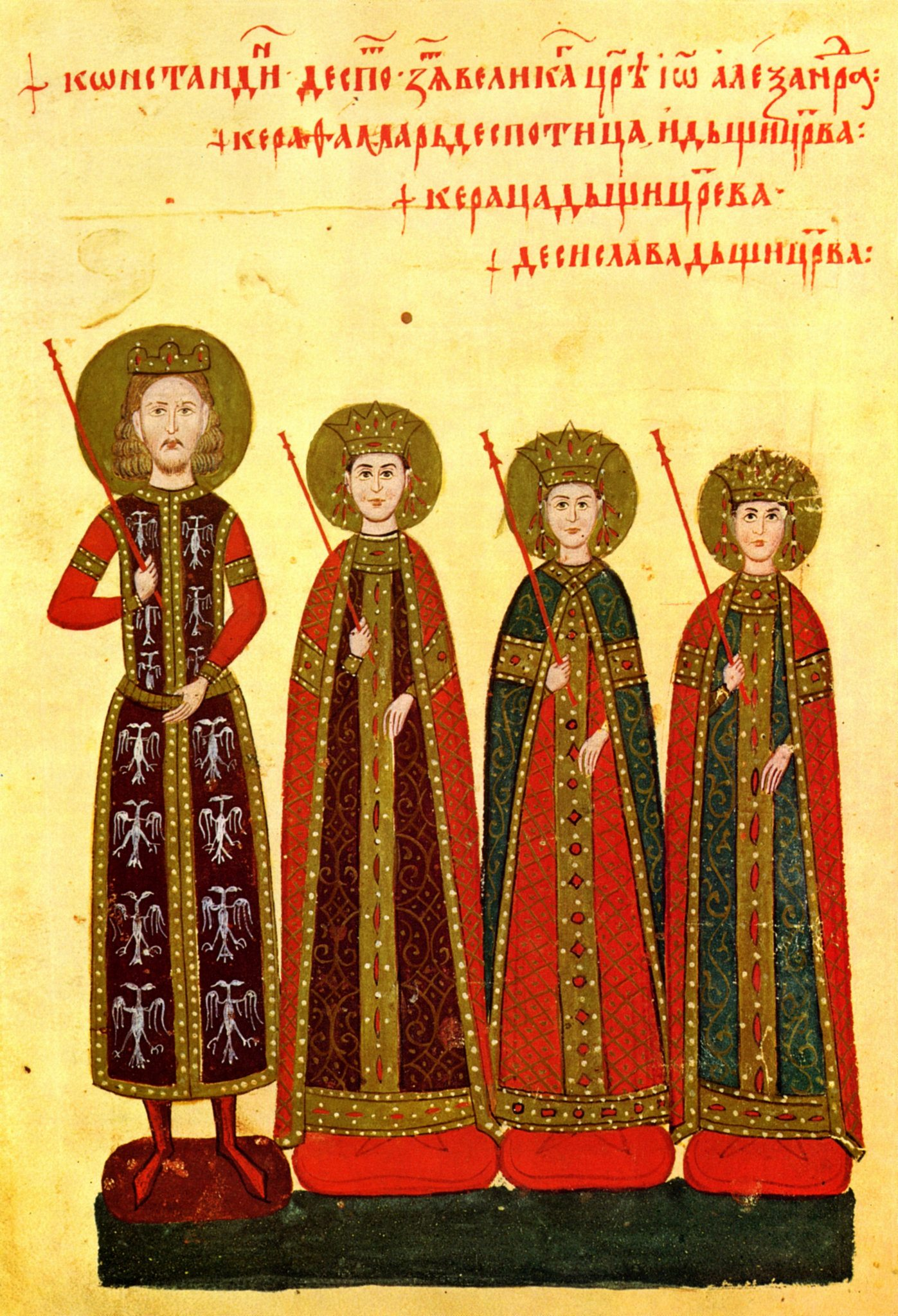
Icon depicting Konstantin Dejanović, Kera-Tamara, Kerica and Desislava

Dejanović was married twice. The name of his first wife is unknown, but she is not identical with Thamar (Tamara), the daughter of the Emperor (tsar) Ivan Alexander of Bulgaria, who had married a certain despotēs Constantine. Konstantin married as his second wife Eudokia of Trebizond, daughter of Emperor Alexios III of Trebizond and Theodora Kantakouzene. By his first wife, Konstantin had at least four daughters and possibly a son:

- Helena Dragases (Jelena Dragaš, nun Hypomone), who married the Byzantine Emperor Manuel II Palaiologos and died on 13 May 1450. Their many children included the last two Byzantine emperors, of whom Constantine XI added the name Dragaš (in Greek, Dragasēs) to his own. Constantine XI was named after his grandfather.
- Three daughters who in 1372 married the Ottoman Sultan Murad I and his sons Bayezid and Yakub.
- Jakov. He converted to Islam and was Lord of Velbužd.

== Legacy ==
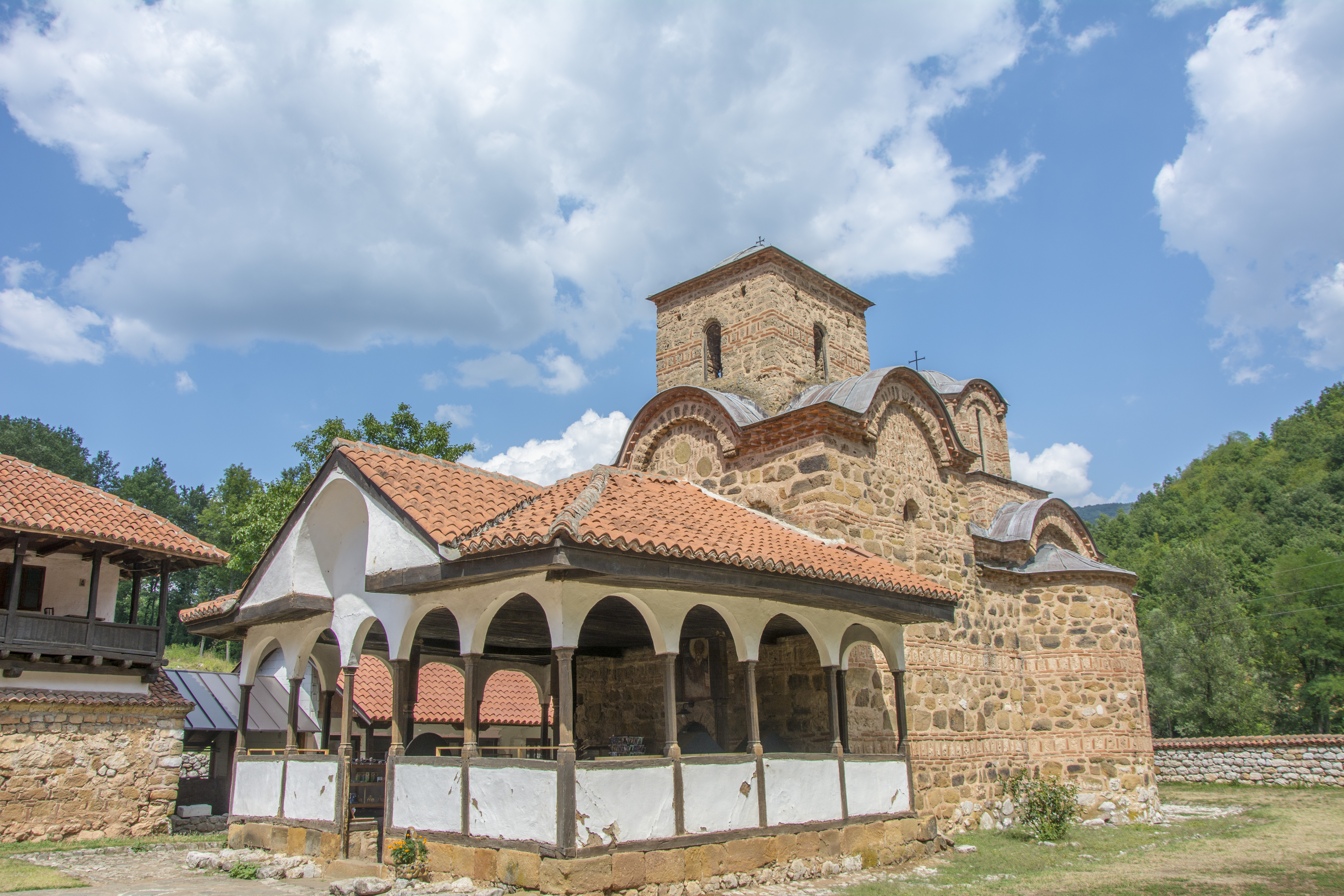
Poganovo Monastery, founded by Dejanović

Dejanović is venerated in Serb epic poetry as Beg Kostadin (in poetry he was given a title of beg because he became an Ottoman vassal). Usually depicted as an overraly negative character, his characterisation primarily serves as a contrast to the persona of Marko Kraljević (the two are often portrayed as being blood brothers), with a purpose of emphasising the difference between the two seemingly identical natures of their respective relations with the Ottomans, since both were the latter's vassals. Their motives are, however, somewhat different. Whereas Marko is portrayed as accepting the Ottoman suzeranity for the sake and the well-being of his flock, Konstantin seeks a way to preserve his position and privileges with little to no regard to any form of higher moral code.

== Notes ==
1. His name in historiography is rendered Konstantin Dejanović (Константин Дејановић). A document from Štip dated to 1388 spells his name as Kostadin (Костадинь). His older brother Jovan used the byname Dragaš (Драгаш), while Konstantin is only found once with that name in sources.
2. Konstantin's titles vary in sources, where he is called variously "lord" (sr. gospodin, gr. kyr or authentēs), and he may have acquired the title of Despot (despotēs), perhaps by his son-in-law, the Byzantine Emperor Manuel II Palaiologos.

== Sources ==
- Bataković, Dušan T., ed. (2005). Histoire du peuple serbe [History of the Serbian People] (in French). Lausanne: L’Age d’Homme.
- Ćirković, Sima (2004). The Serbs. Malden: Blackwell Publishing.
- Fine, John Van Antwerp Jr. (1994) [1987]. The Late Medieval Balkans: A Critical Survey from the Late Twelfth Century to the Ottoman Conquest. Ann Arbor, Michigan: University of Michigan Press.
- Miklosich, Franz (1858). Monumenta Serbica spectantia historiam Serbiae, Bosnae, Ragusii (in Latin). Vienna: apud Guilelmum Braumüller.
- Nicol, Donald M. (1993) [1972]. The Last Centuries of Byzantium, 1261-1453 (2. ed.). Cambridge: Cambridge University Press.
- Palairet, Michael (2015). Macedonia: A Voyage through History. Vol. 1. Cambridge Scholars Publishing.
- Soulis, George Christos (1984). The Serbs and Byzantium during the reign of Tsar Stephen Dušan (1331-1355) and his successors. Washington: Dumbarton Oaks Library and Collection.
