= Alena Mrnjavčević =

Alena Mrnjavčević Алена Мрњавчевић

Queen of the Serbs and Greeks
- Spouse: Vukašin of Serbia
- Issue: Marko Mrnjavčević; Andrijaš Mrnjavčević; Dmitar Mrnjavčević; Ivaniš Mrnjavčević; Olivera Balšić; Milica Balšić
- House: Mrnjavčević (by marriage)
- Religion: Serbian Orthodox

Jevrosima (Serbian Cyrillic: Јевросима), or Alena or Aljena (Serbian Cyrillic: Алена or Аљена, Old Cyrillic: Алѣна), also known as Jelena "Lena" Mrnjavčević (Serbian Cyrillic: Јелена "Лена" Мрњавчевић), was a Serbian noblewoman who later became Queen Consort of Serbia, from 1365 until 1371.

== Biography ==
Although the names of her parents are unknown, it is suggested that she came from the family of Serbian medieval nobility, while in Serbian epic poetry she is described as the sister of Momchil, Bulgarian military leader, the founder of Momchilov grad, who held the title of Sebastokrator.

In 1365, Alena became Queen consort of Serbia, as a wife of King Vukašin of Serbia, member of the House of Mrnjavčević. He was crowned as the co-ruler of Emperor Stefan Uroš V, member of the ruling Nemanjić dynasty.

After becoming a widow, she went to the monastery and took the monastic vows under the name of Jelisaveta (Jevrosima).

== Death ==
Alena died sometime around 1388.

== Issue ==
Vukašin and Alena had six known children, four sons and two daughters:

- Prince Marko
- Andrijaš Mrnjavčević
- Dmitar Mrnjavčević
- Ivaniš Mrnjavčević (d. 1385)
- Olivera Mrnjavčević (d. 1378), married to Đurađ I Balšić
- Milica Mrnjavčević, married to Stracimir Balšić, Lord of Zeta
