= Šarec =

Šarec may refer to:

- Šarec (surname), Slovene surname
- Šarec (horse), Prince Marko's horse
- Šarec (dog) (Šarplaninec), dog breed

== See also ==
- Šarac (disambiguation)
