= Šarac =

Šarac may refer to:

- Šarac (surname), Serbian, Montenegrin, Bosnian and Croatian surname
- Šarac (horse), Prince Marko's horse
- Šarac (dog) (Šarplaninac), dog breed

== See also ==
- Šarec (disambiguation)
