= Mrnjava =

Serbian noble

- Provincial lord
- Born: Zahumlje
- Family: Mrnjavčević
- Issue: Uglješa Mrnjavčević; Vukašin Mrnjavčević
- Father: Mrnjan

Mrnjava (Serbian Cyrillic: Мрњава) was a Serbian provincial nobleman, born in Zahumlje, a frontier province in the western Serbian Kingdom. Mrnjava is the eponymous founder of the notable Mrnjavčević family; his son Vukašin Mrnjavčević became the co-ruler of the Serbian Empire (1365–1371) as king during the fall of the Serbian Empire.

Mrnjava's father was Mrnjan (Serbian Cyrillic: Мрњан, Latin: Mergnanus; fl. c. 1280·1289), a financial chancellor (Latin: camerarius, Serbian: казнац / kaznac, lit. 'chamberlain') who served the king and queen, Stefan Uroš I and Helen of Anjou, at the court at Trebinje (in the royal province of Travunia). Mavro Orbini wrote that the family hailed from Hum, and that the poor Mrnjava and his two sons, who later lived in Blagaj, quickly rose to prominence under Stefan Uroš IV Dušan who sent for them to come to his court. Possibly, the family had left Hum, which had been part of the Serbian Kingdom, after the Bosnian conquest of Hum (1326), and settled in Livno (where Vukašin was allegedly born). The family most likely supported Dušan's Bosnian campaign (1350), in which he saw to reconquer Hum.

The name of his wife is unknown. Modern historiography has confirmed that he fathered two sons:

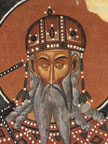
Vukašin

- Uglješa Mrnjavčević (1320–1371), despot of Serres 1365–1371
- Vukašin Mrnjavčević (1320–1371), Lord of the Serbian Land, of the Greeks, and of the Western Provinces (King, co-ruler of Emperor Stefan Uroš V, 1365–1371)

Mavro Orbini (mid 16th century – 1614) added a third son to his descendants. This hypothesis was supported Pavel Jozef Šafárik, but no third son is acknowledged in modern historiography:

- Gojko Mrnjavčević (d. 1371), logothete at the Serbian Imperial court

== Notes ==
1. Name: His name has also been rendered Marnjava (Марњава), Mrnja (Мрња) or Mrnjav (Мрњав). Mikhail Khalanskii claims that his real name was Nenad (Ненад), while Mrnjava was a nickname.
