= Raskovnik =

Magical herb in South Slavic mythology

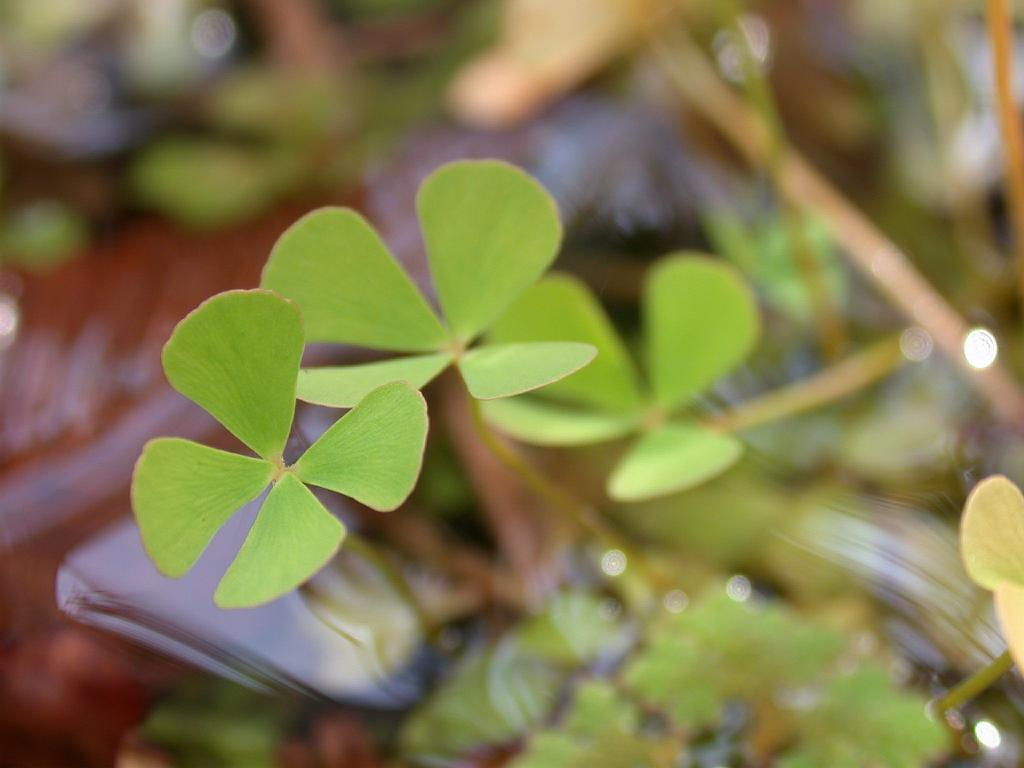
Razkovniche is the Bulgarian-language name for the real plant Marsilea quadrifolia, which shares some features with the legendary raskovnik.

In Slavic folklore, the raskovnik or razkovniche (Serbian Cyrillic and Macedonian: расковник; Bulgarian: разковниче [rɐsˈkɔvnit͡ʃɛ]; Russian: разрыв-трава; Polish: rozryw) is a magical herb. According to lore, the raskovnik has the magical property to unlock or uncover anything that is locked or closed. However, legends claim it is notoriously difficult to recognize the herb, and reputedly only certain chthonic animals are able to identify it.

== Names ==
The herb is known by a multitude of names among the South Slavs, and the names vary significantly by region. While razkovniche and raskovnik are the customary names in Bulgarian and Serbian respectively and the root is also preserved in the Leskovac dialect as raskov, in some parts of Macedonia it is known as ež trava ("hedgehog herb"). In the vicinity of Bar (southeastern Montenegro), the term is demir-bozan, a Turkish borrowing meaning "iron breaker". In Syrmia, the plant is referred to as špirgasta trava (a hapax legomenon), in Slavonia it is known as zemaljski ključ ("earth key"), and in Slovenia's Savinja Valley as mavričin koren ("rainbow root").

== Description and properties ==
Traditionally, it is considered that few people, if any, could actually recognize the herb. However, in Bulgarian sources the raskovnik is sometimes described as a plant resembling a four-leaf clover. It grows in meadows and may be picked either while green and blooming or in hay, when it is already dry. While it is not necessarily rare, nor does it thrive only in remote locations, it is nevertheless impossible to recognize by the uninitiated. In the words of Serbian linguist and folklorist Vuk Stefanović Karadžić, “It is some (maybe imaginary) herb whose touch is thought to be able to open every lock or closure.”

According to the legend, the raskovnik could unlock any gate or padlock, regardless of its size, material or key. It could also uncover treasures buried in the ground: in Bulgarian beliefs, it could split the ground at the place where a treasure lay so that people could locate it. In some regions of Serbia, the treasure itself was a black man in chains who requested that a raskovnik be brought to him. The raskovnik would break the chains and the man would disappear into the ground to be replaced by a cauldron filled with gold coins. Other supernatural properties attributed to the herb by Bulgarians include the alchemic ability to transmute iron into gold, the more general ability to make the one who picked it forever happy or wealthy. In some interpretations, the raskovnik is a wonderful plant that makes true whatever its owner desires.

== Obtainment ==
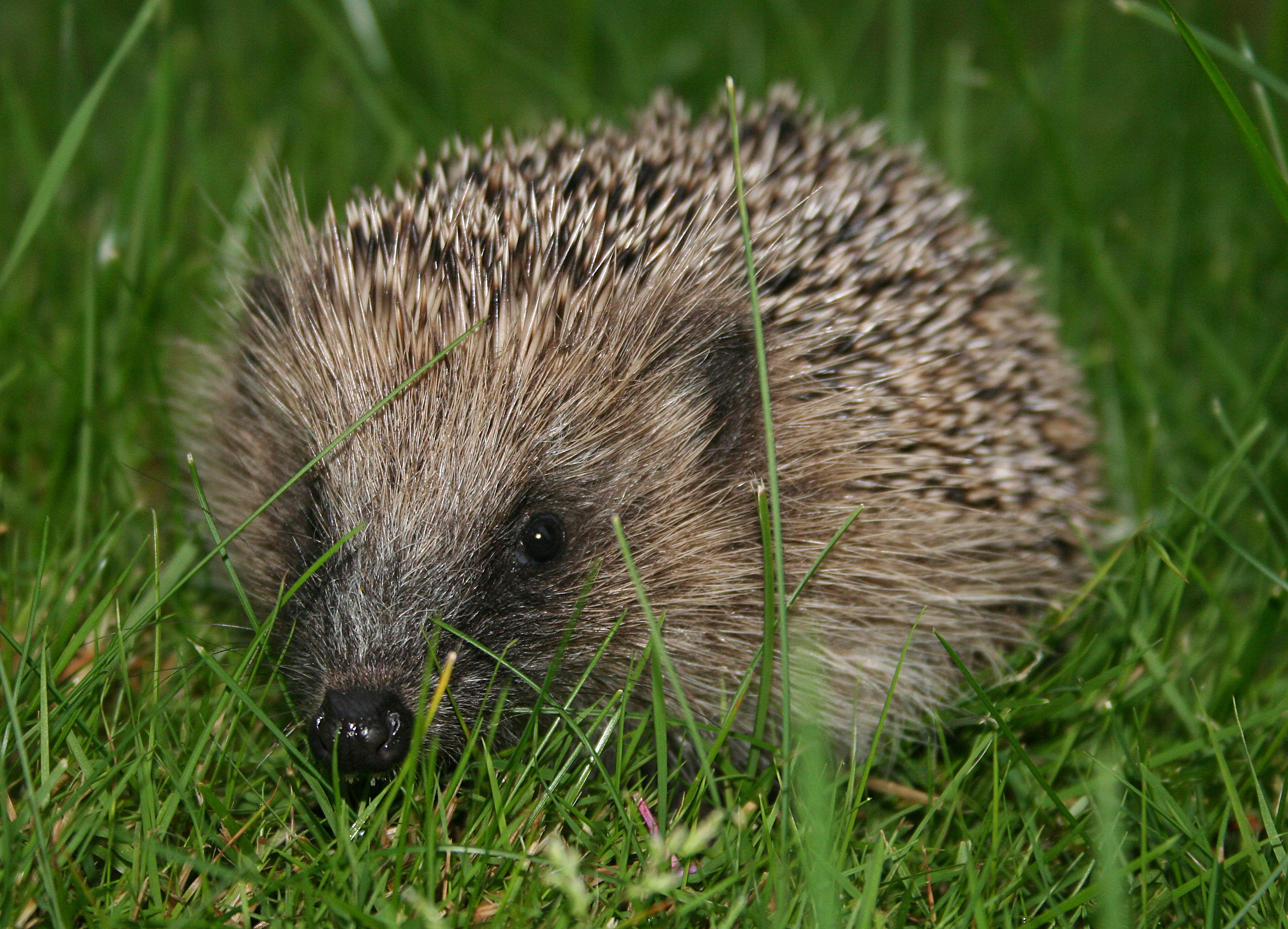
In some parts of Serbia, hedgehogs are believed to be animals capable of identifying the raskovnik and involuntarily assisting people in obtaining it.

The raskovnik is believed to have been sought after by treasure hunters, sorcerers and herbalists who desired its magic powers for personal benefit. In Serbia, it was believed that there exist certain treasures, such as the Treasure of Tsar Radovan, which could not be unlocked in any other way but employing a raskovnik.

As, according to Bulgarian folklore, tortoises were the only beings who knew the appearance of the herb and the location where it grows, such people would try to obtain the raskovnik by deceiving a tortoise. They would find a tortoise nesting site and hem it in with a fence while the tortoise is away. When it returns, the tortoise would be unable to access its eggs, so it would return with a raskovnik in order to breach the fence. Thus, the tortoise would reveal the herb and people would acquire it from the tortoise, which does not need it anymore.

While the tricking of a tortoise was the most popular method in Bulgarian mythology, in Dalmatia the legend refers to snakes, and among Serbs another version involves the locking of young hedgehogs in a box for their mother to unlock. In Serbia, one would also have to be quick to take the raskovnik, as the hedgehog would swallow it after use. In any case, turtles, snakes and hedgehogs are all animals with chthonic characteristics which were often variously associated with the underworld in South Slavic tradition.

Karadžić also mentions another Serbian method to obtain the raskovnik. He recorded a story from the town of Zemun about a merchant who desired to find the herb. The merchant locked an old woman into leg irons and let her wander in a field during the night; if the irons unlocked by themselves at a certain place, that would be a place where the raskovnik grows.

== Metaphoric use ==
The legendary herb has entered the modern Bulgarian vocabulary as a metaphor for a magic key or a panacea in the wider sense. The phrase “to find the razkovniche” („да намериш разковничето“ „da namerish razkovnicheto“) means to find the solution to a certain problem, usually a complex or difficult one. Razkovniche is also the common Bulgarian name for the plant European waterclover (Marsilea quadrifolia) which, in its appearance, has many similarities with the descriptions of the mythical raskovnik. In eastern Serbia, raskovnik also refers to a specific plant used in vernacular medicine, namely Laserpitium siler.
