= List of places named after Prince Marko =

This is a list of toponyms named after or connected with Prince Marko.

== Named ==
- (Bosnia and Herzegovina) Kula Kraljevića Marka (Tower of Prince Marko) near Višegrad;
  - Markovo sedalo, a chair-shaped boulder near the tower;
  - Markove stope (Marko's footprints), indentations in the stone;
  - Other indentations in the stone were explained as hoofprints of Marko's horse Šarac. The three were destroyed while building a railway. The Šarac's hoofprints are mentioned in the opening of Ivo Andrić's novel The Bridge on the Drina.
- (Serbia) Markov kamen (Marko's stone), a boulder on Miroč mountain. The boulder had a hoof-shaped indentation explained as hoofprint of Marko's horse Šarac.
- (Serbia) Markov kamen (Marko's stone), a boulder on Kopaonik mountain.
- (Croatia) Markov kamen (Marko's stone), near Konavle, on hill between Cavtat and Konavle
- (Croatia) Stope Kraljevića Marka (Marko's footprints), near Trpanj
- Markov kamen (Marko's Stone), a mountain peak in Montenegro near Bijelo Polje.
- (Serbia) Markov kamen - Mečji vrh (Marko's Stone - Bear Sow's peak), a forest in Boljevac Municipality
- (Montenegro) Markov kamen (Marko's Stone) or Markov val, a stećak near Žabljak, explained as being the gravestone of Marko.
- (North Macedonia) Markov manastir (Marko's Monastery), a monastery built by Marko.
- (Bosnia and Herzegovina) Markov točak (Marko's spring), a spring in the village of Prpe near Banjaluka. Explained as created by Marko when he threw a huge stone there.
- (North Macedonia) Markova crkva (Marko's church) or Markova peštera (Marko's Cave), remains of a church built in a cave church near the Babuna river near Veles.
- (Serbia) Markova Crkva (Marko's Church), a village and its church in the Lajkovac Municipality. Named by monks who escaped from the Marko's monastery.
- Markova noga (Marko's Leg), the southernmost point of North Macedonia.
- (Serbia) Markova stolica (Marko's Chair), a small plateau on Vidrak hill near Valjevo. Explained as created by Marko when he sat to rest on the mountain while cooling his feet in the river Kolubara.
- (North Macedonia) Markovi Kuli (Marko's Towers), a fortress where Marko lived.
- (Serbia) Markovo kale, a fortress ruin near Vranje.

== Related ==
- (North Macedonia) Musov grob (Musa's Grave) near Stenkovec, explained as the place of the fight between Marko and Musa the Robber.
- (Bosnia and Herzegovina) Šarčeva kopita (Šarac's hooves) in Sarajevo.
- (Serbia) Šuplji kamen (Hollow stone), a boulder with a hole near the village of Spaj; the hole is explained as made by Marko with his mace.
