= Pirlitor =

Coordinates: 43.163°N 19.234°E

Pirlitor was a medieval fortress in Mount Durmitor, in Old Herzegovina (part of present-day Montenegro), built at the edge of the deep canyon of the Tara River. Only a part of the wall at the fortress's highest point has survived to the present day. It is located 16 km from the town of Žabljak, at the altitude of about 1450 meters. Pirlitor overlooked the medieval road between Nikšić and Pljevlja, at the place where the road descended from Durmitor's Lake Plateau into the canyon.

Pirlitor is not mentioned in medieval sources. It is known that Voivode Sandalj Hranić had a court on the Lake Plateau, where his successor Voivode Stjepan Vukčić negotiated peace with the Ragusans in 1453. This court could actually be Pirlitor, since it is the only fortification known to have been built on the plateau.

According to the Serbian epic poetry, Pirlitor belonged to Voivode Momčilo, a man of immense size and strength who possessed magical attributes: a winged horse named Jabučilo and a sabre with eyes. His sister Jevrosima was the legendary mother of Prince Marko, one of the greatest heroes of Serbian epic poems. In one of them, the situation of the "Pirlitor Castle" is described like this:

Кад погледаш с града изнад себе,
Ништа немаш лијепо виђети,
Већ бијело брдо Дурмитора
Окићено ледом и снијегом
Усред љета, као усред зиме;
Кад погледаш стрмо испод града,
Мутна тече Тара валовита,
Она ваља дрвље и камење.

Translation:

If from the Castle thou lookest up,
Thou hast naught that is fair to see
But only white Durmitor mountain
Arrayed in ice and snow,
In summer as in winter;
If from the Castle thou lookest down,
Yonder gloomy Tara floweth turbulent,
Rolling with it trees and stones.
