= Mrnjavčević family =

Serbian noble family

House of Mrnjavčević Мрњавчевић
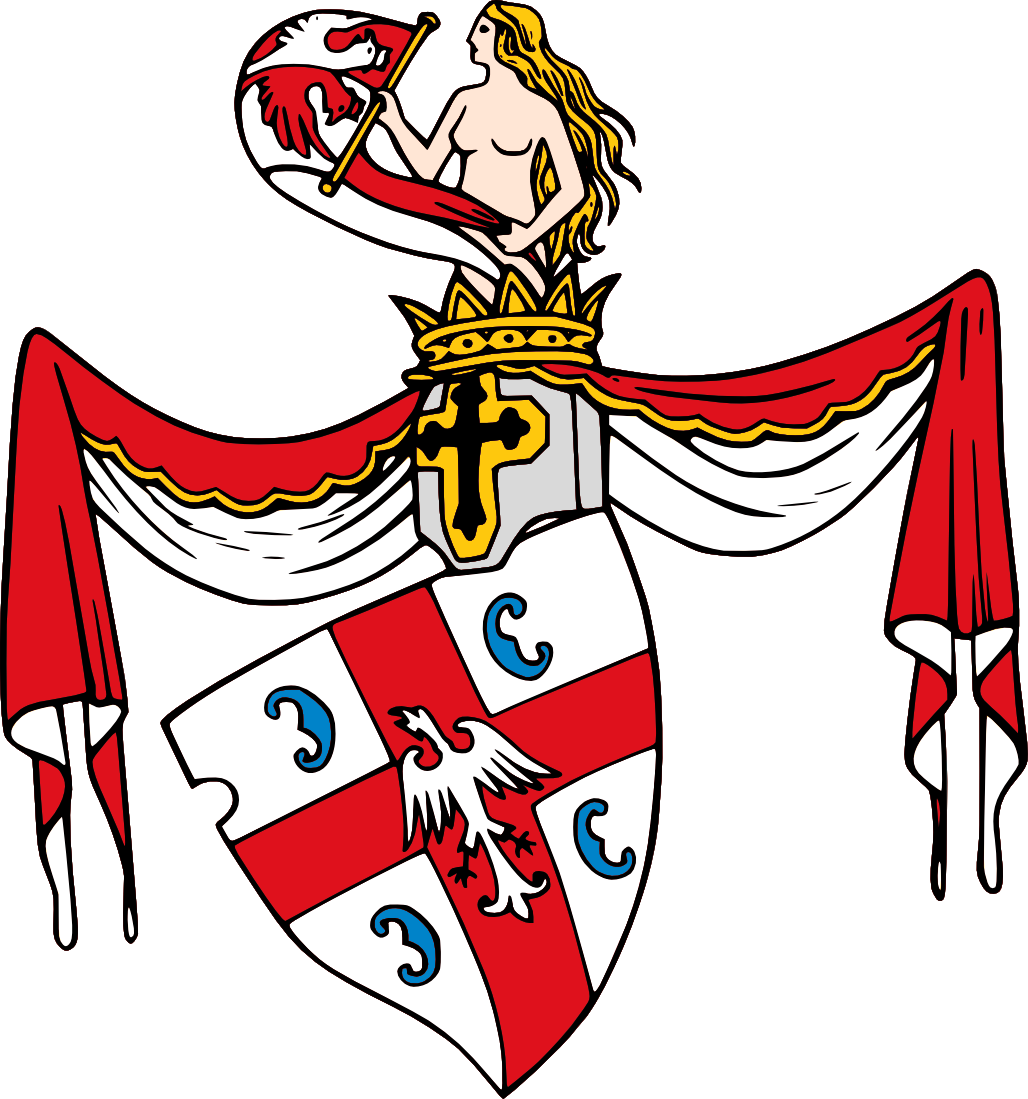
- Attributed (fictional) Coat of arms of Mrnjavčević family presented in the Korjenić-Neorić Armorial (1595)
- Country: Serbian Empire
- Founded: 1365
- Founder: Vukašin Mrnjavčević
- Estate: Prilep
- Dissolution: 1395

The House of Mrnjavčević (Serbian Cyrillic: Мрњавчевић, pl. Mrnjavčevići / Мрњавчевићи, pronounced [mr̩̂ɲaːʋt͡ʃeʋit͡ɕ]) was a medieval Serbian noble house during the Serbian Empire, its fall, and the subsequent years when it held a region of present-day Macedonia region. The house ruled a province from its base at Prilep (in modern North Macedonia) from 1366 to 1395.

Vukašin Mrnjavčević was a military commander in the army of Emperor Dušan the Mighty (r. 1331-1355) and co-ruler of Serbia as king, with Emperor Uroš the Weak (r. 1355-1371). After Uroš' death, the Serbian Empire crumbled, as the nobility could not agree on its rightful successor. Vukašin's son, Marko Kraljević, ruled his hereditary lands as titular King of Serbs and Greeks.

== History ==
=== Origin ===
The family's progenitor, after whom historiography names it, was Mrnjava, a financial chancellor (kaznac, chamberlain) who served King Stefan Uroš I and his wife, Queen Helen of Anjou at the court at Trebinje (in Travunia). Ragusan historian Mavro Orbin (1563–1610) wrote that the family hailed from Hum, and that the poor Mrnjava and his three sons, who later lived in Blagaj, quickly rose to prominence under King Stefan Dušan. Possibly, the family had left Hum, which had been part of the Serbian Kingdom, after the Bosnian conquest of Hum (1326), and settled in Livno (where Vukašin was said to be born). The family most likely supported Dušan's Bosnian campaign (1350), in which he saw to reconquer Hum.

== Family tree ==
- Mrnjava (fl. 1280–89), a treasurer of Queen Helen of Anjou
  - Vukašin (1320–1371), King and Lord of the Serbian and Greek Lands, and of the Western Provinces (1366–71)
    - Marko (1335–1395), Young King, titular King of Serbs (1371–95)
    - Andrijaš (fl. 1371–95)
    - Ivaniš
    - Dmitar (fl. 1365–d. 1410)
    - Olivera, married Đurađ I Balšić
    - Milica, married Stracimir Balšić, Lord of Zeta
  - Jovan Uglješa (1320s–1371), despot, ruler of Serres (1356–71), married Jelena Nemanjić
    - Tvrtko (d. circa 1366)
    - Uglješa (d. circa 1371)
    - Eupraxia, a nun
  - Jelena, married to Nikola Radonja Branković

== See also ==
- List of Serbian monarchs

== Sources ==
- Fine, John V. A. (1994) [1987]. The Late Medieval Balkans: A Critical Survey from the Late Twelfth Century to the Ottoman Conquest. Ann Arbor, Michigan: University of Michigan Press.
- Orbini, Mauro (1601). Il Regno de gli Slavi hoggi corrottamente detti Schiavoni. Pesaro: Apresso Girolamo Concordia.
- Орбин, Мавро (1968). Краљевство Словена [Kingdom of the Slavs] (in Serbian). Beograd: Српска књижевна задруга.
- Рудић, Срђан (2001). "О првом помену презимена Мрњавчевић" (PDF). Историјски часопис (48): 89–97. Archived from the original (PDF) on 2016-03-04.
- Soulis, George Christos (1984). The Serbs and Byzantium during the Reign of Tsar Stephen Dušan (1331–1355) and his Successors. Washington, District of Columbia: Dumbarton Oaks. ISBN 0-88402-137-8.
- Aleksa Ivić; Dušan Mrđenović; Dušan Spasić; Aleksandar Palavestra (1987). Rodoslovne tablice i grbovi srpskih dinastija i vlastele. Belgrade: Nova knjiga.
