= Andrijaš Mrnjavčević =

Serbian noble

Andrijaš Vukašinović Mrnjavčević
- King (nominal)
- Reign: 1371–1395
- Predecessor: Vukašin Mrnjavčević
- Successor: Position abolished
Names
- Andrijaš Vukašinović Mrnjavčević
- House: House of Mrnjavčević
- Father: Vukašin Mrnjavčević
- Mother: Alena

Andrijaš Vukašinović Mrnjavčević or Andrija Kraljević (?) was a 14th-century Serbian noble who governed the region of Prilep 1371–1395. His father was the Serbian King Vukašin (co-ruler with Stefan Uroš V). His brother was the Serbian King Marko, who ruled the region of Macedonia (Old Serbia) from 1371 to 1395.

He held a territory of his older brother Marko's realm, he minted his own coins and had the title of "King" (hence "Kraljević"). After the death of Marko in 1395, Andrijaš and his brother Dmitar left Macedonia to settle with the Serbs in Ragusa, there they receive a treasure which their father King Vukašin had left for them. From Ragusa they headed for Hungary where they settled with other Serbs, Dmitar became "Great Zupan of Zărand" and "Royal Commandant of the city of Villagoš" where there were many Serbs. According to the Dečani chronicle, Andrijaš died in the Battle of Rovine.

Political offices
Preceded by Župan of Prilep; King Vukašin; Under Stefan Dušan	King of Prilep (Sub-ordinate to King Marko); 1371–1395	Succeeded by Position abolished (Ottoman Empire)
