= Vukašin of Serbia =

Vukašin Mrnjavčević Вукашин Мрњавчевић
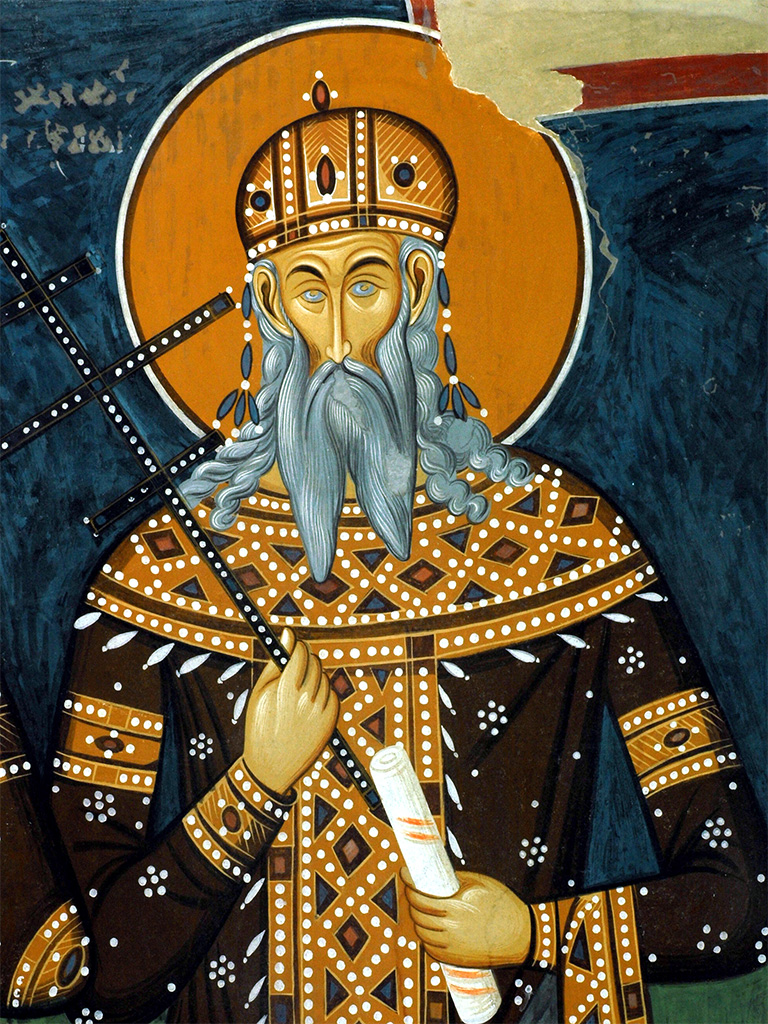
- Detail of fresco in the Psača Monastery, between 1365 and 1371

King of the Serbs and Greeks
- Reign: 1365 – 27 September 1371
- Predecessor: Stefan Uroš V
- Successor: Marko Mrnjavčević
- Born: c. 1320; Livno, Bosnia
- Died: 27 September 1371; Maritsa, Bulgaria
- Spouse: Alena Mrnjavčević
- Issue more...: Marko Mrnjavčević; Andrijaš Mrnjavčević; Dmitar Mrnjavčević
- House: Mrnjačević
- Father: Mrnjava
- Religion: Serbian Orthodox

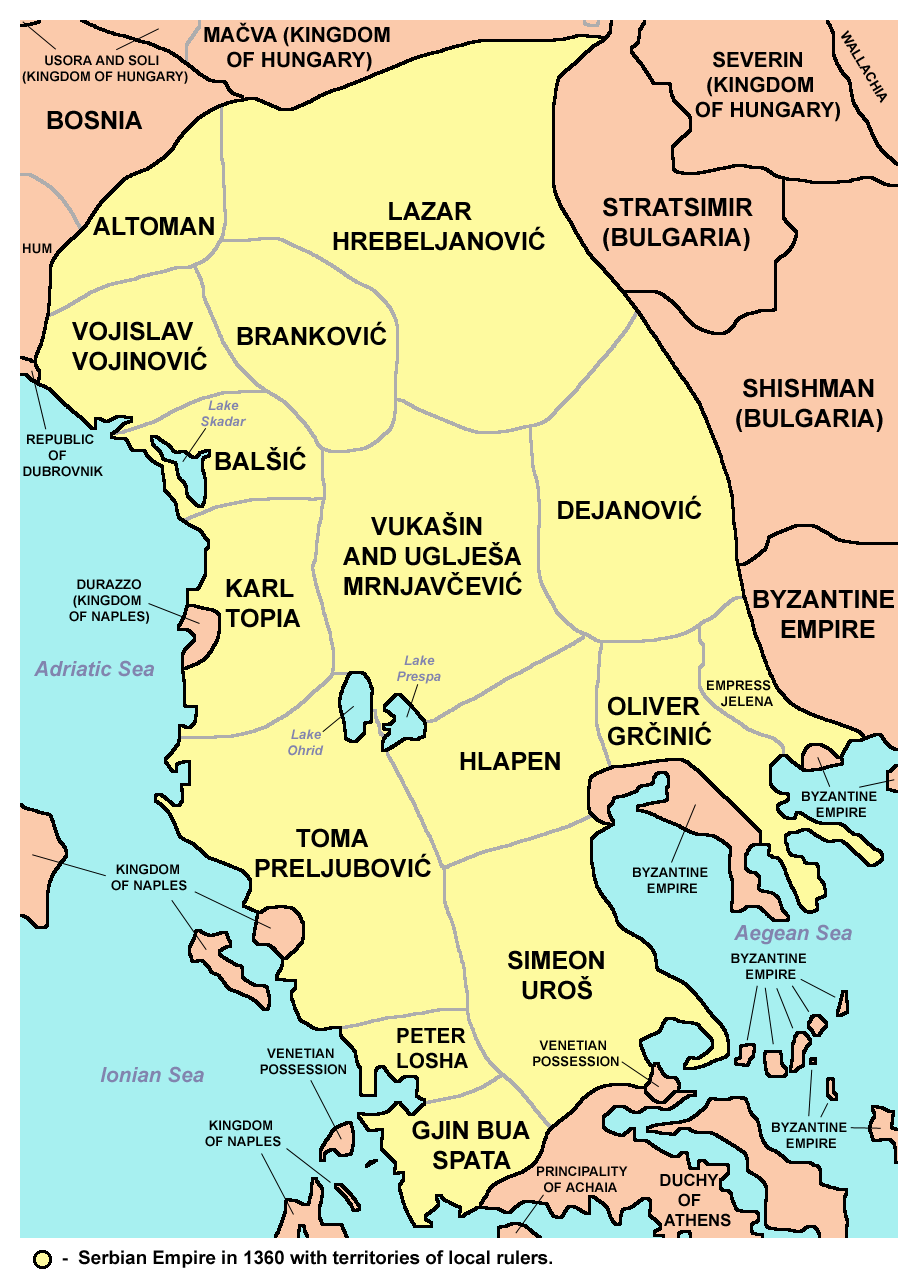
Domain of Vukašin and Uglješa Mrnjavčević (in 1360).

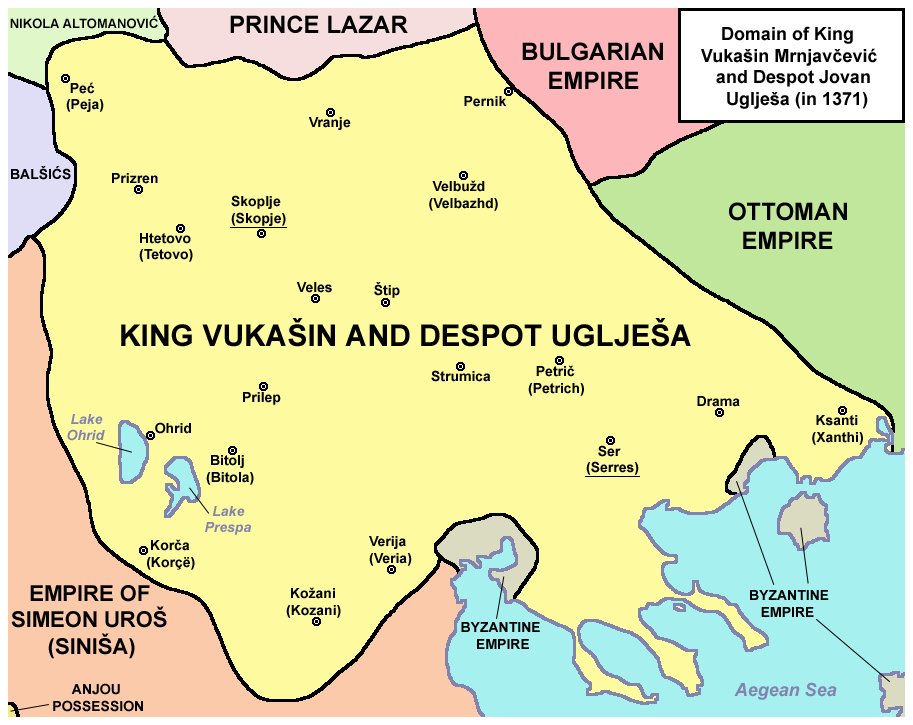
Domain of King Vukašin Mrnjavčević and Despot Jovan Uglješa (in 1371).

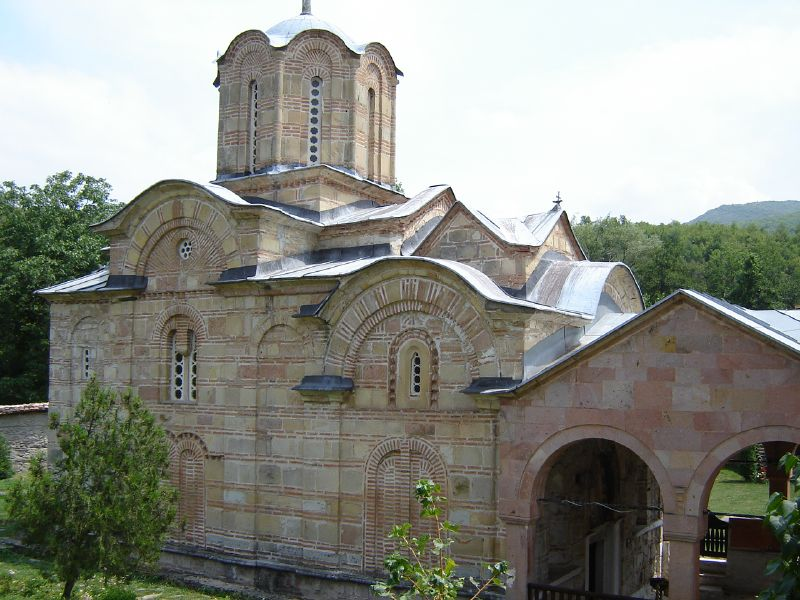
Marko's Monastery was founded by Vukašin Mrnjavčević and Prince Marko

Vukašin Mrnjavčević (Serbian Cyrillic: Вукашин Мрњавчевић, pronounced [ʋukǎʃin mr̩̂ɲaːʋtʃeʋitɕ]; c. 1320 – 26 September 1371) was King of Serbia as the co-ruler of Stefan Uroš V from 1365 to 1371. He was also a nobleman. Principal domains of Vukašin and his family were located in southern parts of medieval Serbia and northwestern parts of the modern region of Macedonia. He died in the Battle of Maritsa in 1371 with his brother, Jovan Uglješa.

In folk tradition, Vukašin is referred to as a usurper and, wrongly, the murderer of Tsar Uroš. He was often considered de facto ruler of Serbian Empire during the reign of Uroš.

== Background ==
According to 17th-century Ragusan historian Mavro Orbini, his father was a minor noble named Mrnjava from Zachlumia, whose sons Vukašin and Uglješa Mrnjavčević were born in Livno in western Bosnia. Some of Orbin's historical accounts are based on oral traditions of his time, but a 1280 Ragusan document mentions a Mrnjan as a nobleman from Trebinje, a town in Travunia in the vicinity of Zachlumia. The same Mrnjan is mentioned again in a 1289 charter as a treasurer of the Serbian queen Helen of Anjou. After Zachlumia was annexed by Bosnia in 1326, the family of Mrnjan, or Mrnjava, could have moved to Livno. Possibly the family supported Serbian Emperor Dušan's invasion of Bosnia in 1350, as did other Zachlumian nobles, and fearing punishment, emigrated to Serbia when the war was about to start. In favor of Zachumlian or Travunian origin of Vukašin also speaks the inscription on the tomb in a church in Ohrid, where certain Ostoja Rajaković of the Ugarčić clan (died 1379) is referred to as a cousin of Vukašin's eldest son Marko. The Ugarčić clan is attested in contemporary sources as inhabiting the region of Trebinje.

After Serbia had expanded southwards into Macedonia, the local feudal lords—Greeks—were replaced with Serbs, many of whom were from Zachlumia and Travunia. Around 1350 Emperor Dušan appointed Vukašin the župan (district governor) of Prilep in Macedonia. From then on Vukašin rapidly rose, and was one of the most dominant Serbian nobles at the time of the sudden death of Dušan in 1355. He was given the title of despot by Dušan's successor Emperor Stefan Uroš V. In 1365 he was crowned King of the Serbs and Greeks as the co-ruler of Emperor Uroš. He ruled over an area which included Prizren, Skopje and Prilep, and had good relations with his brother, Despot Jovan Uglješa who ruled an area around Ser. Later he became strong enough to disobey Uroš. By 1369, as Uroš was childless, Vukašin designated his eldest son Prince Marko as heir to the throne, with the title of "young king".

In 1370 he contributed to the monasteries of Mount Athos and prepared a war against the Ottoman Empire, which his brother supported. Vukašin was to attack Trebinje in June 1371 but it was never carried out. In September 1371, he established a coalition with his brother against the Ottomans and advanced. The Serbian army of the coalition numbering ca. 70,000 men met the Ottoman army led by beylerbey of Rumeli Lala Şâhin Paşa at the Battle of Maritsa on 26 September 1371 where superior Ottoman tactics won over. The Ottomans attacked the Serbian Army while they rested and Vukašin's forces were routed and himself killed during the battle.

== Family ==
With his wife Alena (Old Cyrillic: Алѣна), Vukašin had at least five children:

- Marko Mrnjavčević
- Andrijaš Mrnjavčević
- Dmitar Mrnjavčević
- Ivaniš Mrnjavčević
- Olivera Mrnjavčević
  - Jelisanta
    - Jelena, married to Rajko Moneta

== In popular culture ==
Brian Aldiss - published an alternative-history fantasy story "The Day Of The Doomed King" about King Vukašin.

== See also ==
- Serbian nobility conflict (1369)
- Serbian epic poetry

== Sources ==
- Ćirković, Sima (2004). The Serbs. Malden: Blackwell Publishing. ISBN 9781405142915.
- Dvornik, Francis (1962). The Slavs in European History and Civilization. New Brunswick, New Jersey: Rutgers University Press.
- Fine, John Van Antwerp Jr. (1994) [1987]. The Late Medieval Balkans: A Critical Survey from the Late Twelfth Century to the Ottoman Conquest. Ann Arbor, Michigan: University of Michigan Press. ISBN 0472082604.
- Gavrilović, Zaga (2001). Studies in Byzantine and Serbian Medieval Art. London: The Pindar Press. ISBN 9781899828340.
- Nicol, Donald M. (1993) [1972]. The Last Centuries of Byzantium, 1261-1453. Cambridge: Cambridge University Press. ISBN 9780521439916.
- Nicol, Donald M. (1996). The Reluctant Emperor: A Biography of John Cantacuzene, Byzantine Emperor and Monk, c. 1295-1383. Cambridge: Cambridge University Press. ISBN 9780521522014.
- Ostrogorsky, George (1956). History of the Byzantine State. Oxford: Basil Blackwell.
- Pavlikianov, Cyril (2001). The Medieval Aristocracy on Mount Athos: Philological and Documentary Evidence for the Activity of Byzantine, Georgian and Slav Aristocrats and Eminent Churchmen in the Monasteries of Mount Athos from the 10th to the 15th Century. Sofia: Center for Slavo-Byzantine Studies. ISBN 9789540715957.
- Popović, Tatyana (1988). Prince Marko: The Hero of South Slavic Epics. New York: Syracuse University Press. ISBN 9780815624448.
- Sedlar, Jean W. (1994). East Central Europe in the Middle Ages, 1000-1500. Seattle: University of Washington Press. ISBN 9780295800646.
- Soulis, George Christos (1984). The Serbs and Byzantium during the reign of Tsar Stephen Dušan (1331-1355) and his successors. Washington: Dumbarton Oaks Library and Collection. ISBN 9780884021377.

Vukašin of Serbia House of Mrnjavčević Born: c. 1320 Died: 26 September 1371
Regnal titles
Preceded by Stefan Uroš V	King of Serbia; 1365–1371 with Stefan Uroš V	Succeeded by Prince Marko
