= Šarac (surname) =

Šarec is a Serbian, Montenegrin, Bosnian and Croatian surname. Notable people with the surname include:

- Dejan Šarac (born 1998), an Austrian football player
- Dino Šarac (born 1990), a Serbian football player
- Dragan Šarac (born 1975), a Serbian football player
- Josip Šarac (born 1998), a Croatian handball player

== See also ==
- Šarec (surname), a Slovene surname
