= Jovan Uglješa =

Serbian nobleman

- Grand Voivode (Veliki Vojvoda); Despot
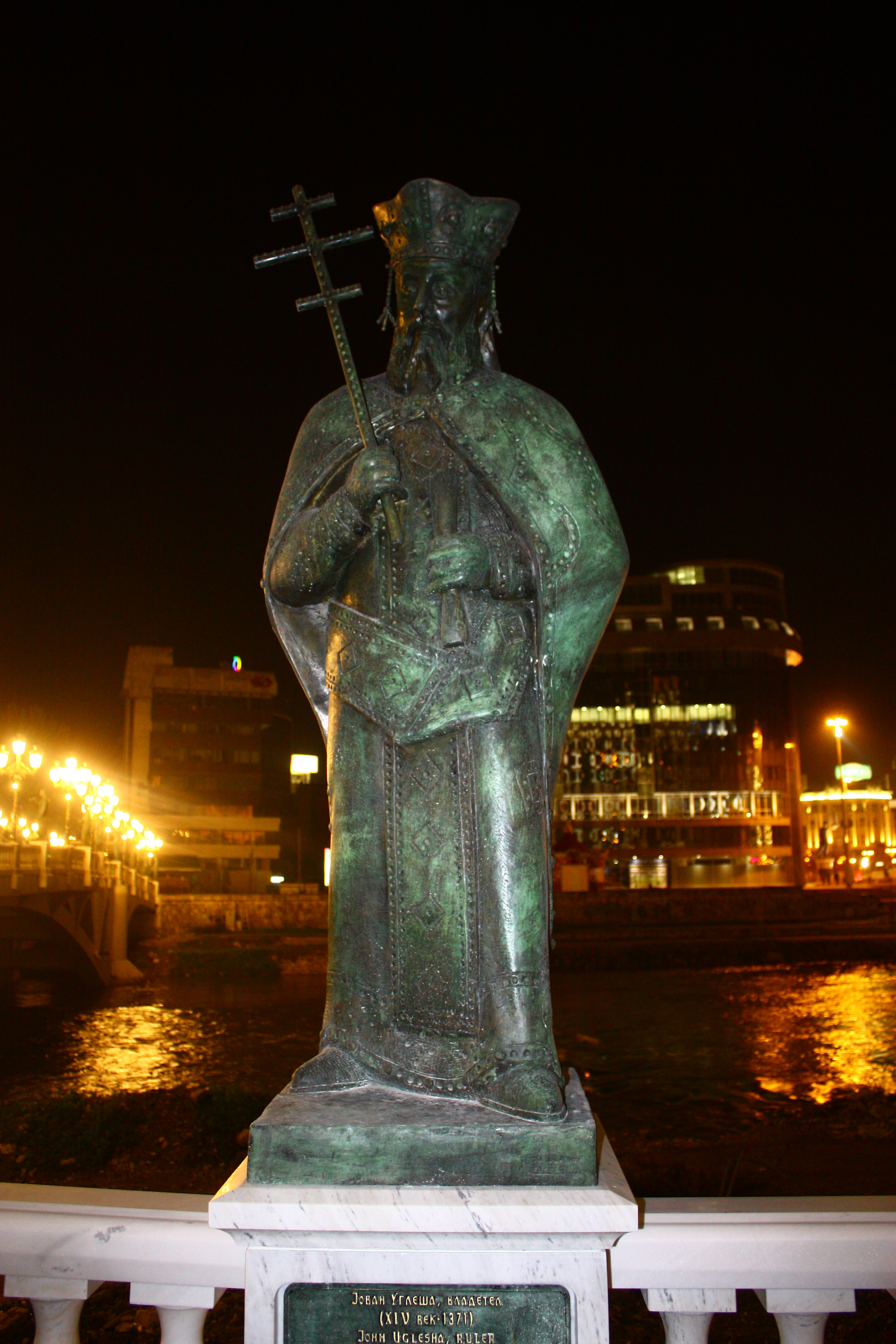
- Statue at the Bridge of Civilizations in Skopje
- Died: 26 September 1371; Maritsa
- Cause of death: Battle of Maritsa †
- Spouse: Jelena (Jefimija)
- Parents: Mrnjava

Jovan Uglješa (Serbian Cyrillic: Јован Угљеша; fl. 1346–1371) was a Serbian medieval nobleman of the Mrnjavčević family and one of the most prominent magnates of the Serbian Empire. He held the title of despot, received from Serbian Emperor Stefan Uroš V, whose co-ruler - Serbian King Vukašin was Uglješa's brother.

Uglješa was the son of Mrnjava, a treasurer of Helen, the queen consort of Stephen Uroš I of Serbia. He held Travunija in 1346, during the rule of Stefan Dušan (1331–1355). Uglješa married Jelena (later nun Jefimija), daughter of Vojihna, the kesar of Drama. This boosted the power of Uglješa, who would later govern the region alongside his father-in-law. Vojihna died in 1360, and his lands were inherited by Uglješa. He was given the title of despotes by the widowed Serbian empress, Helena of Bulgaria, in 1365. His domain, the Principality of Serres, was situated along the lower course of the Struma with Serres as seat, eventually replacing Helena in its possession. From 1368, his territory was under the religious jurisdiction of the Ecumenical Patriarchate of Constantinople. The Patriarch mentioned the "master of Raška" (another name for Serbia), Jovan Uglješa, in a letter from 1371. With the Ottoman threat rising in the Balkans, Uglješa and his brothers Vukašin Mrnjavčević and Gojko Mrnjavčević tried to oppose the Turks. Uglješa was killed on 26 September 1371 in the Battle of Maritsa. Their troops were defeated by those of Ottoman commanders Lala Shahin Pasha and Gazi Evrenos at the Battle of Maritsa in 1371. The defeat resulted in large portions of the region of Macedonia falling under Ottoman power. Additionally, Uglješa's two brothers were killed during the fight. Their courage made them heroes of Bulgarian and Serbian epic poetry.

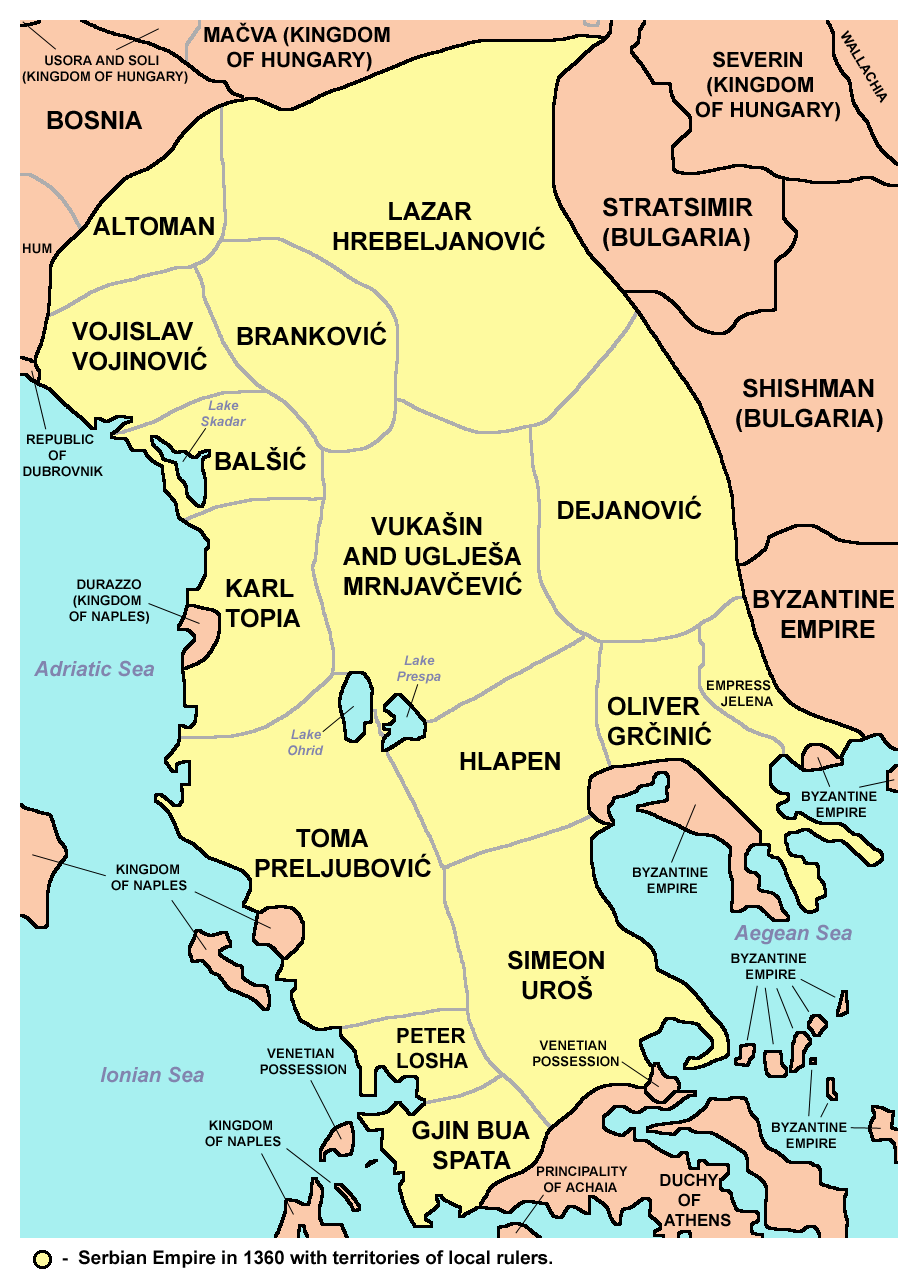
Domain of Vukašin and Uglješa Mrnjavčević (in 1360).

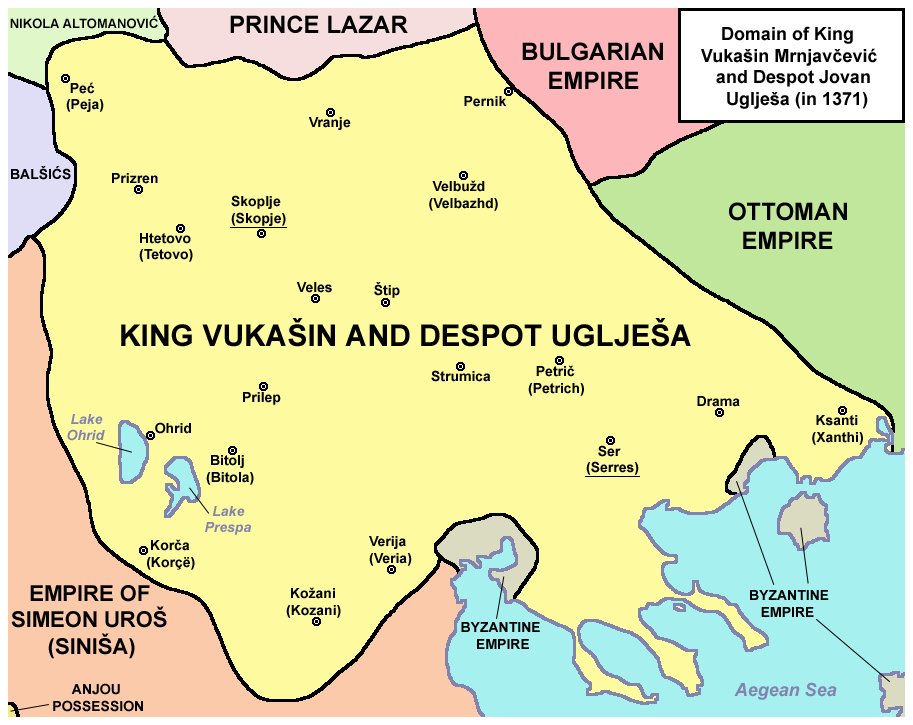
Domain of King Vukašin Mrnjavčević and Despot Jovan Uglješa (in 1371).

== See also ==
- House of Mrnjavčević
- Serbian epic poetry

== Sources ==
- Ćirković, Sima (2004). The Serbs. Malden: Blackwell Publishing. ISBN 9781405142915.
- Dvornik, Francis (1962). The Slavs in European History and Civilization. New Brunswick, New Jersey: Rutgers University Press.
- Fine, John V. A., Jr. (1994) [1987]. The Late Medieval Balkans: A Critical Survey from the Late Twelfth Century to the Ottoman Conquest. Ann Arbor, Michigan: University of Michigan Press. ISBN 978-0-472-10079-8.
- Gavrilović, Zaga (2006). "Women in Serbian politics, diplomacy and art at the beginning of Ottoman rule". In Jeffreys, Elizabeth M. (ed.). Byzantine Style, Religion and Civilization: In Honour of Sir Steven Runciman. Cambridge University Press. pp. 72–90. ISBN 9780521834452.
- Nicol, Donald M. (1993) [1972]. The Last Centuries of Byzantium, 1261–1453 (Second ed.). Cambridge: Cambridge University Press. ISBN 978-0-521-43991-6.
- Nicol, Donald M. (1996). The Reluctant Emperor: A Biography of John Cantacuzene, Byzantine Emperor and Monk, c. 1295-1383. Cambridge: Cambridge University Press. ISBN 9780521522014.
- Ostrogorsky, George (1956). History of the Byzantine State. Oxford: Basil Blackwell.
- Pavlikianov, Cyril (2001). The Medieval Aristocracy on Mount Athos: Philological and Documentary Evidence for the Activity of Byzantine, Georgian and Slav Aristocrats and Eminent Churchmen in the Monasteries of Mount Athos from the 10th to the 15th Century. Sofia: Center for Slavo-Byzantine Studies. ISBN 9789540715957.
- Popović, Tatyana (1988). Prince Marko: The Hero of South Slavic Epics. New York: Syracuse University Press. ISBN 9780815624448.
- Sedlar, Jean W. (1994). East Central Europe in the Middle Ages, 1000-1500. Seattle: University of Washington Press. ISBN 9780295800646.
- Soulis, George Christos (1984). The Serbs and Byzantium during the reign of Tsar Stephen Dušan (1331-1355) and his successors. Washington: Dumbarton Oaks Library and Collection. ISBN 9780884021377.

Preceded by Empress Helena	Ruler of Serres; 1365–1371	Recovery of Serres by the Byzantine Empire
Vacant Title last held by Stefan Konstantin	Count of Travunia; 1346	Unknown
