= Šarec (surname) =

Šarec is a Slovene surname. Notable people with the surname include:

- Marjan Šarec (born 1977), Slovenian politician, actor, and comedian
- Veronika Šarec (born 1969), former alpine skier

== See also ==
- Šarac (surname), a Serbian, Montenegrin, Bosnian and Croatian surname
