= Marko's Monastery =

Monastery in North Macedonia

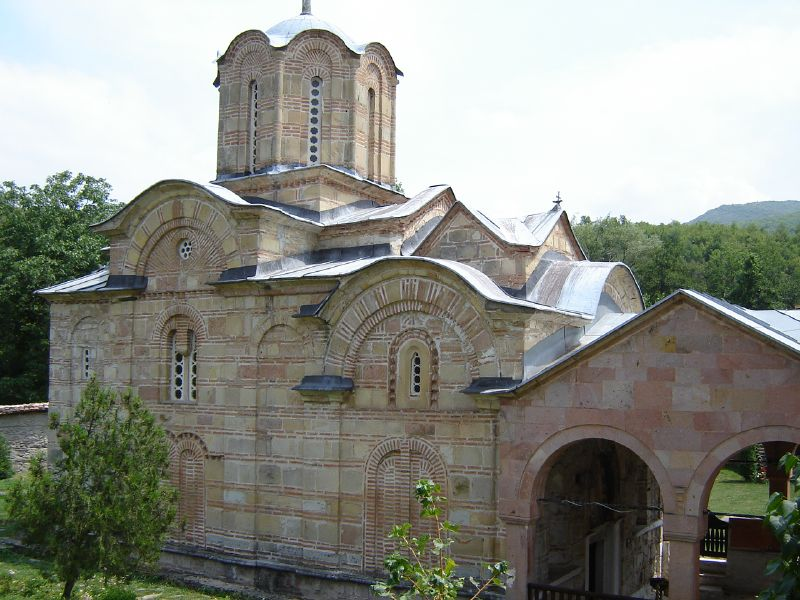
- Church of Saint Demetrius at Marko's Monastery
- Interactive map of Marko's Monastery

Monastery information
- Order: Macedonian Orthodox
- Established: 1346
- Diocese: Diocese of Skopje
- Controlled churches: Church of Saint Demetrius

People
- Founders: Vukašin Mrnjavčević (ktitor), Prince Marko

Site
- Location: Markova Sušica, Studeničani Municipality
- Coordinates: 41°53′57″N 21°24′34″E
- Public access: yes

Marko's Monastery (Macedonian and Serbian: Марков Манастир, romanized: Markov Manastir) is a monastery located in the village of Markova Sušica, 18 kilometres (11 mi) from central Skopje in North Macedonia. The monastery bears the name of Serbian Prince Marko, who reigned at the time of its completion in the 14th century. Marko's Monastery has been active since its establishment.

== Description ==
Marko's Monastery contains a single cross-shaped church dedicated to Saint Demetrius. The monastery grounds also consist of lodgings, a belfry, a well, warehouses, a bakery, and a mill. The monastery still operates a special oven used to make rakija.

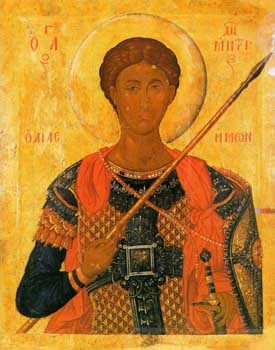
Fresco depicting Saint Demetrius

The church has a narthex, a central dome and a smaller dome on the western side. It was built of bricks and stone. The iconstasis is made of stone pillars.

The frescoes inside the church were done by a number of painters from the region. The Holy Mother of God, the twelve great feasts, Jesus Christ, and Saint Nicholas are some of the subjects depicted in the frescoes.

== History ==
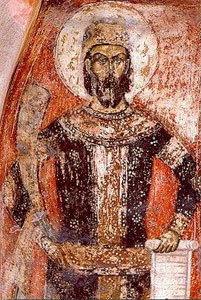
Fresco depicting King Marko

Construction of the Church of Saint Demetrius began under King Vukašin in 1346. The church, including the interior paintings, were completed 30 years later. Before Ottoman rule, the monastery had a school and many monks and priests would write manuscripts.

In 1392, Skopje fell under Ottoman rule, which led to the destruction of many churches and monasteries in the area. Marko's Monastery, however, suffered almost no damage. During the Ottoman era, in 1467/8 the monastery is recorded as having 20 monks. Kiril Peychinovich was the hegumen of Marko's Monastery from 1801 to 1818.

In 1830, Ottoman aristocrat Hamzi Paşa added an exonarthex to the church.

Frescoes showing the ktetor King Vukašin and his son Prince Marko were the most defaced by overpainting with a fat-based paint in 1894, an act of national fanaticism ordered by the Bulgarian metropolitan of Skopje. In the 1920s, attempts were made to restore the damaged frescoes.
