= Black Arab (mythology) =

Depiction of Arabs or black people in Serbian mythology and folklore

In Serbian, Macedonian, and in Bulgarian mythology, Black Arab (Serbian: Црни Арапин, Crni Arapin, Bulgarian: Църен Арапин, Черен Арап(ин), Macedonian: Црна Арапина, Crna Arapina) is a designation for Arabs and black people. The Black Arab is often depicted as a dark-skinned ruffian who kidnaps women and girls. In Serbian folklore, as well as in the beliefs of other Balkan peoples, the Arab is a chthonic demon, a replacement for the devil. Some authors compare it with Slavic Triglav.

In a story of Serb folklore, an Arab, after being slain in battle, escapes while carrying his head in his arm. Some other tales and folk songs have the character of a three-headed Arab.

In Bulgarian folklore, notable national heroes such as Sider Voevoda or Strahil Voevoda fight Black Arab.

In Serbian and Macedonian folklore Krali Marko fights against Black Arab.

== Literature ==
- Interpretations, volume III, 2009: Black Arab as a Figure of Memory
