= Dmitar Mrnjavčević =

Serbian nobleman

- dominus castellan of Világos
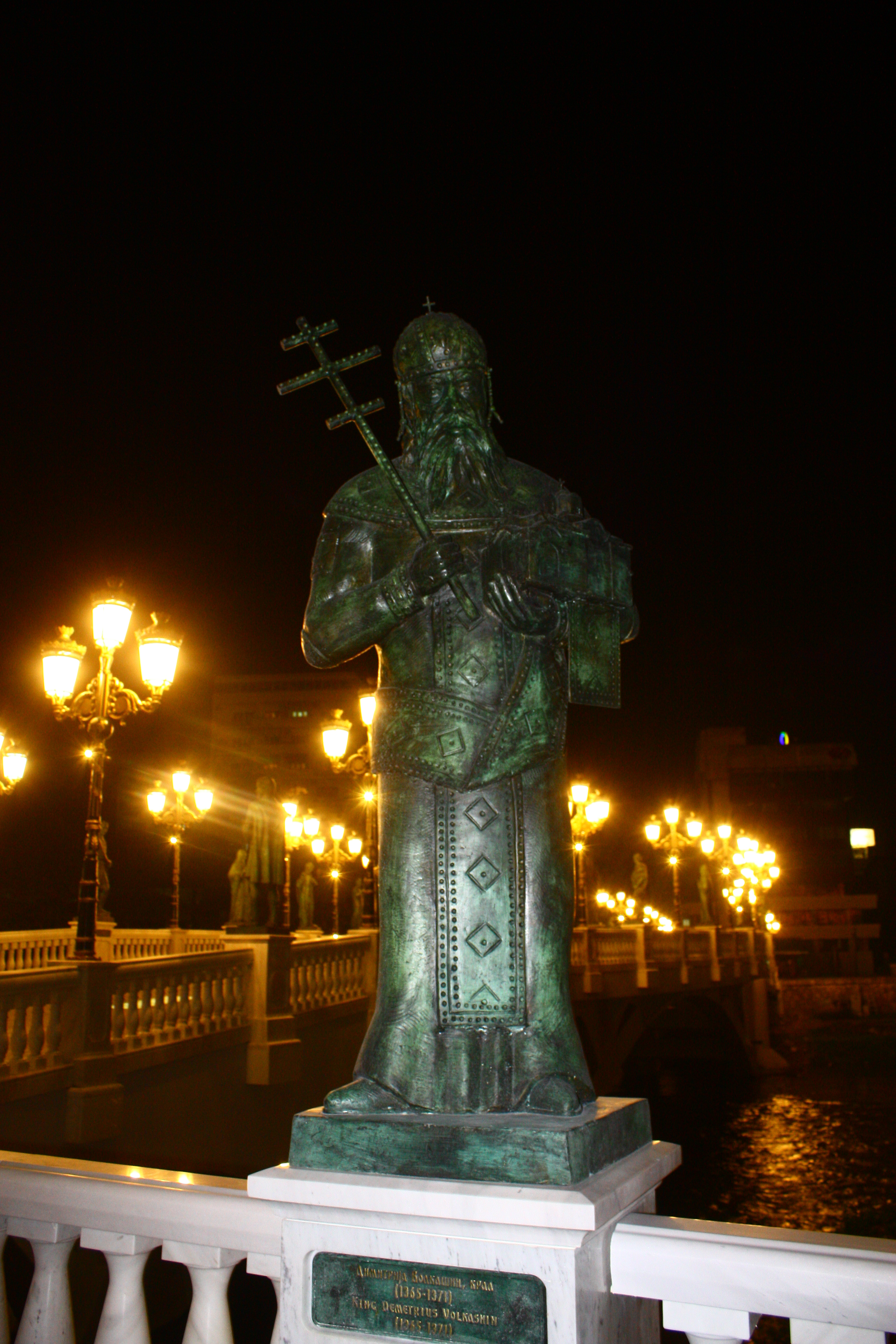
- Statue at the Art Bridge in Skopje
- Died: 1407
- Parents: Vukašin Mrnjavčević

Dmitar Mrnjavčević (Serbian Cyrillic: Дмитар Мрњавчевић; fl. 1376–1407), known in epic poetry as Dmitar Kraljević (Дмитар Краљевић), was a Serbian nobleman, a member of the Mrnjavčević family, who served the Kingdom of Hungary. He was the son of Vukašin Mrnjavčević and brother of Marko and Andrijaš. He is a character in Serbian epic poetry.

Dmitar is mentioned in a 1376/77 document of the Church of St. Demetrius near Skopje (modern North Macedonia). The Mrnjavčević brothers had good relations until conflict arose when Marko met with Sultan Bayezid I in the winter of 1393/94 and remained loyal to him, while Andrijaš and Dmitar refused to serve the sultan. The brothers were in Dubrovnik by the end of July, 1394, receiving the treasure of their late father Vukašin. After the Battle of Rovine, the two brothers split on their father's deposit. In 1399 and 1400 Dmitar was in Dubrovnik, as a diplomat of the Hungarian King. He appeared again in December 1402 and March 1403 as dominus Dmitrius when receiving a tribute (pay) in Ragusa by King Sigismund, with Rafael Gučetić (son of Marin Gučetić) collecting on behalf of Dmitar. Dmitar then went to live in Hungary, where he settled among the Serbian refugees. He served in the Hungarian army and had the title of veliki župan of Zărand, and was royally appointed commander castellan of the city of Világos (now Șiria in Romania) by Sigismund as early as 1402 until his death. He died after June 30, 1407 and before 1410, most probably during the struggles of 1409, at the side of Despot Stefan Lazarević, against the despot's brother Vuk and the Ottoman Empire. He maintained good relations with Hungary and Ragusans, especially with the Gučetić family.

== Sources ==
- Fostikov, A. (2002). "About Dmitar Kraljević" (PDF). Историјски часопис (49): 47–65. Archived from the original (PDF) on 2018-03-24.
- Popović, Dušan J. (1957). Srbi u Vojvodini (1): Od najstarijih vremena do Karlovačkog mira 1699. Matica srpska. p. 151.
