= Dejan Sarac =

Austrian footballer

Personal information
- Date of birth: 17 January 1998 (age 28)
- Place of birth: Graz, Austria
- Height: 1.89 m (6 ft 2 in)
- Positions: Midfielder; forward

Team information
- Current team: Aluminij
- Number: 33

Youth career
- 2004–2011: Sturm Graz
- 2012–2015: Admira Wacker
- 2015–2018: Lazio

Senior career*
| Years | Team | Apps | (Gls) |
| 2019 | Lafnitz II | 16 | (1) |
| 2019 | Lafnitz | 1 | (0) |
| 2020 | Varaždin | 0 | (0) |
| 2021 | Kapfenberg | 4 | (1) |
| 2022 | Opatija | 11 | (1) |
| 2023 | Zlatibor | 1 | (0) |
| 2023 | SW Bregenz | 5 | (0) |
| 2024– | Aluminij | 1 | (0) |
- * Club domestic league appearances and goals as of 26 March 2024

Dejan Sarac (born 17 January 1998) is an Austrian footballer, currently a free agent after last playing as a midfielder or attacker for Aluminij in the Slovenian PrvaLiga.

== Career ==
In 2015, Sarac joined the youth academy of Italian Serie A side Lazio, despite interest from Liverpool, one of the most successful clubs in England.

In 2018, he left Lazio due to injury.

Before the second half of 2018/19, Sarac signed for Austrian second division side Lafnitz, where he made 1 league appearance and scored 0 goals.

Before the second half of 2019/20, he signed for Varaždin in Croatia.
