= Stefan Uroš V =

King (r. 1346–55) and 2nd Tsar (r. 1355–71) of the Serbian Empire

Saint Stefan Uroš V Стефан Урош V
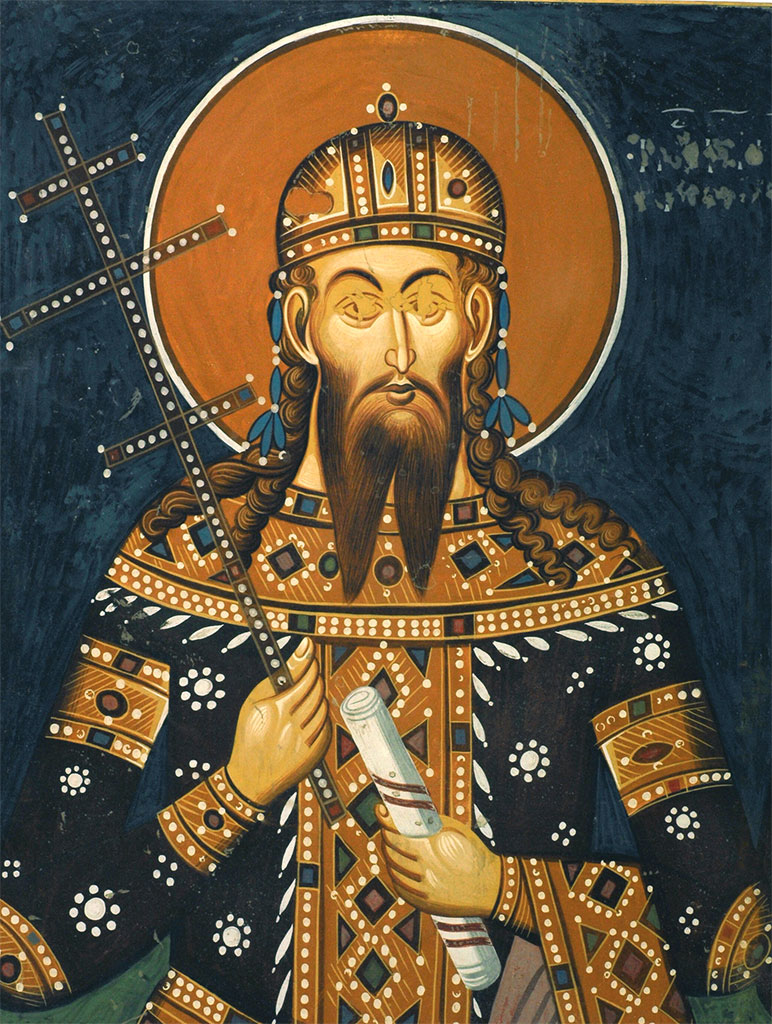
- Detail of fresco in the Psača Monastery, between 1365 and 1371

Church builder
- Born: c. 1336
- Died: 4 December 1371 (aged 34–35)

King of Serbs and Greeks
- Reign: 1346–1355
- Predecessor: Stefan Dušan
- Successor: Vukašin Mrnjavčević

Emperor of Serbs and Greeks
- Reign: 1355–1371
- Predecessor: Stefan Dušan
- Successor: Simeon Uroš (pretender)
- Burial: Gornje Nerodimlje, near Uroševac; Monasteries of Fruška Gora (since 1690), finally to Jazak monastery
- Spouse: Anna of Wallachia
- Dynasty: Nemanjić
- Father: Stefan Dušan
- Mother: Helena of Bulgaria
- Religion: Serbian Orthodox

Saint Stefan Uroš V (Serbian Cyrillic: Стефан Урош V, pronounced [stêfaːn ûroʃ peːti]; 1336 – 2/4 December 1371), known in historiography and folk tradition as Uroš the Weak (Serbian: Урош Нејаки, romanized: Uroš Nejaki), was the second Emperor (Tsar) of the Serbian Empire (1355–1371), and before that he was Serbian King and co-ruler (since 1346) with his father, Emperor Stefan Dušan.

== Early life ==
Stefan Uroš V was the only son of Stefan Uroš IV Dušan by Helena of Bulgaria, the sister of Ivan Alexander of Bulgaria. He had been crowned as king (second highest title) in the capacity of heir and co-ruler after Dušan was crowned emperor in 1346. Although by the time of his succession as sole ruler and emperor in 1355 Stefan Uroš V was no longer a minor, he remained heavily dependent on his mother and various members of the court.

== Reign ==
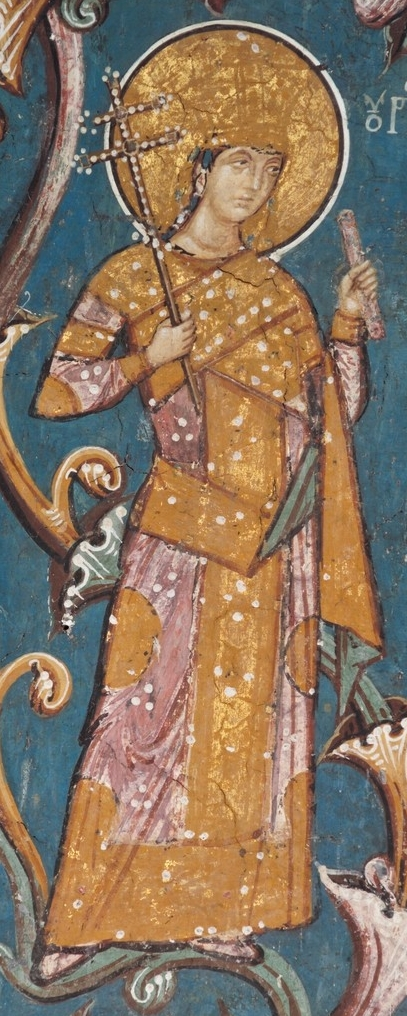
Depiction in the Serbian Orthodox Monastery of Visoki Dečani, Serbia

The account of the contemporary John VI Kantakouzenos describes the descent of the Serbian Empire into disintegration soon after the death of Uroš' father and his accession. However, Kantakouzenos mainly focused on the Greek lands rather than the Serbian core lands. Further the general disorder along with the powerlessness of the center represents the situation that arose much later in Uroš's reign. According to Mihaljčić, during the initial years of his rule the threats to the territorial integrity of Uroš's empire in the south came mainly from external attacks.

The death of Uroš's father was quickly followed by the death of Preljub, who governed the region of Thessaly. In the spring of 1356, Nikephoros Orsini landed a force on the coast of Thessaly and quickly overran it. He then followed up this success by driving despot Simeon Uroš from Aetolia and Acarnania. Simeon was a paternal uncle and the closest male relative of young Emperor Uroš. Retreating to Epirus and western Macedonia, he seized Kostur and proclaimed himself Tsar in hope of becoming co-ruler, or even replacing young Uroš on the Serbian throne. His claim was not widely welcomed, and the support he gained was limited to some southern regions. The Sabor (state council) held in Skoplje did not accept Simeon's claims and following the endorsement of the magnates, Uroš became more energetic in his political activities, publishing a number of charters. In 1358, Simeon attacked the Skadar region, trying to capture the old Serbia region of Zeta, but was defeated. Defeated in the north, Simeon again turned to south, retaking Epirus and Thessaly in 1359, where he continued to rule with the title "emperor of Serbs and Greeks".

There is one account, early in his reign, that is in contrast to his general record of incompetence. In 1356, Matthew Kantakouzenos, a pretender to the Byzantine throne, gathered an army of 5,000 Turks and marched on Serres, the Serbian-held capital of Jovan Uglješa. Uroš V, whose mother ruled from Serres, decided to raise an army to defend his mother. In 1357, when Matthew and his Turks attacked, the Serbian army under Vojihna of Drama (a major player in that region) came to aid. The Turks were defeated. Matthew Kantakouzenos was captured and held hostage until his ransom was paid by the Byzantine Emperor John V Palaiologos.

In following years, the Serbian Empire gradually fragmented into a conglomeration of principalities, some of which did not even nominally acknowledge Uroš's rule. His position was not helped by his mother Helena, who started to rule autonomously from the Principality of Serres in alliance with Jovan Uglješa. A similarly autonomous posture was assumed by the Dejanović family, the Balšić family, Nikola Altomanović. By 1365, the most powerful Serbian nobleman became Uglješa's brother Vukašin Mrnjavčević who became co-ruler with Emperor Uroš and was granted the title of Serbian King. By 1369, as Uroš was childless, Vukašin designated his eldest son Prince Marko as heir to the throne, with the title of "young king".

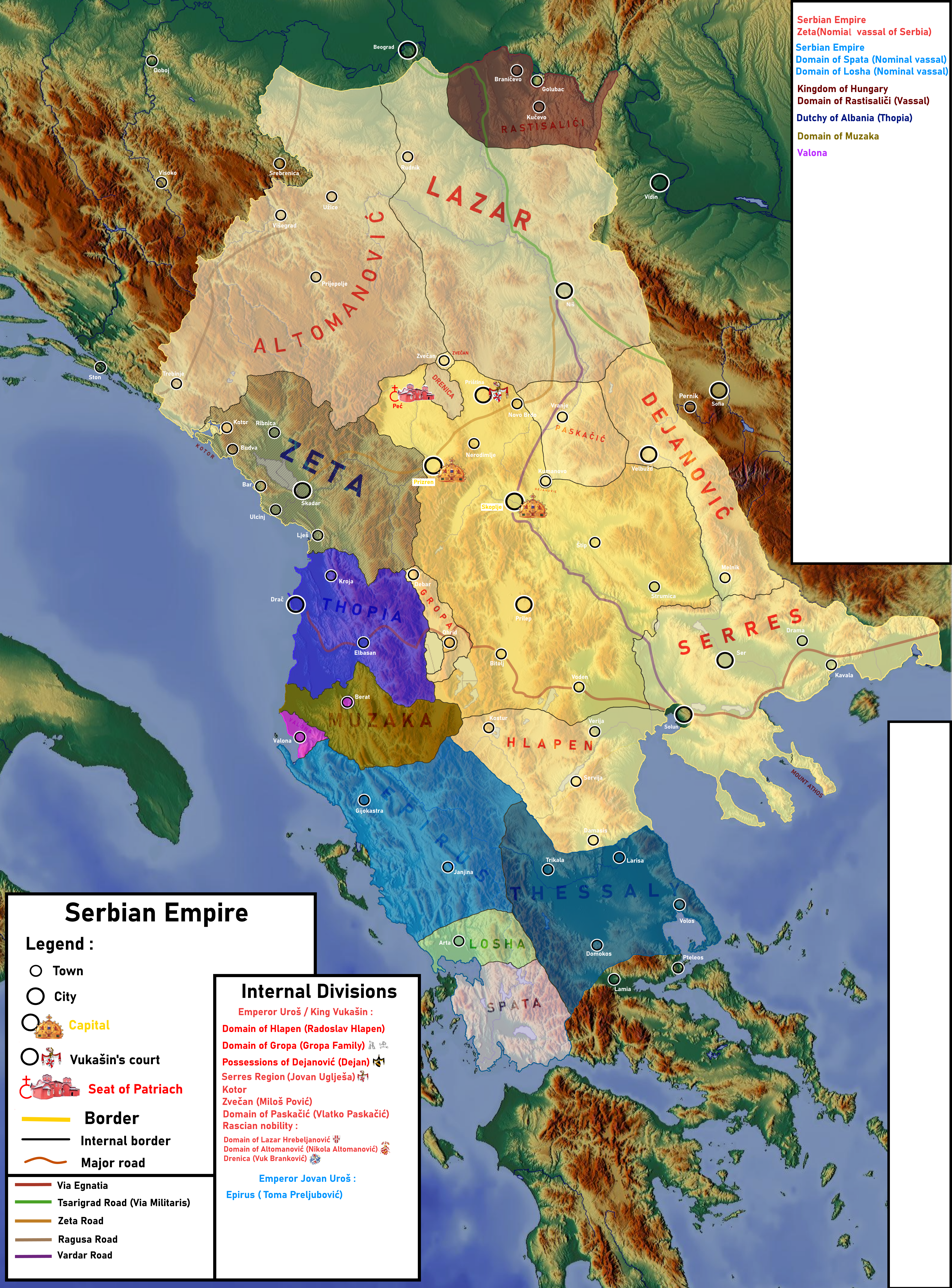
Serbian Empire and its internal divisions in 1371

Stefan Uroš V died childless in December 1371, after much of the Serbian nobility had been destroyed by the Turks in the Battle of Maritsa earlier that year. The exact cause of his death at a relatively young age remains unknown. Vukašin's son Prince Marko inherited his father's royal title, but real power in northern Serbia was held by Lazar Hrebeljanović. The latter did not assume the imperial or royal titles (associated with the Nemanjić dynasty), and in 1377 accepted King Tvrtko I of Bosnia (a maternal grandson of Stefan Dragutin) as titular king of Serbia. Serbia proper became a vassal of the Ottomans in 1390, but remained effectively ruled by the Lazarević family and then by their Branković successors until the fall of Smederevo in 1459.

The exceptional modesty and tolerance of this ruler was the main reason he was called "the weak", and also the reason he was canonized 211 years after his death.

Stefan Uroš V was canonized by the Serbian Orthodox Church. His body is kept in the Jazak monastery on Fruška Gora mountain.

== Legacy ==
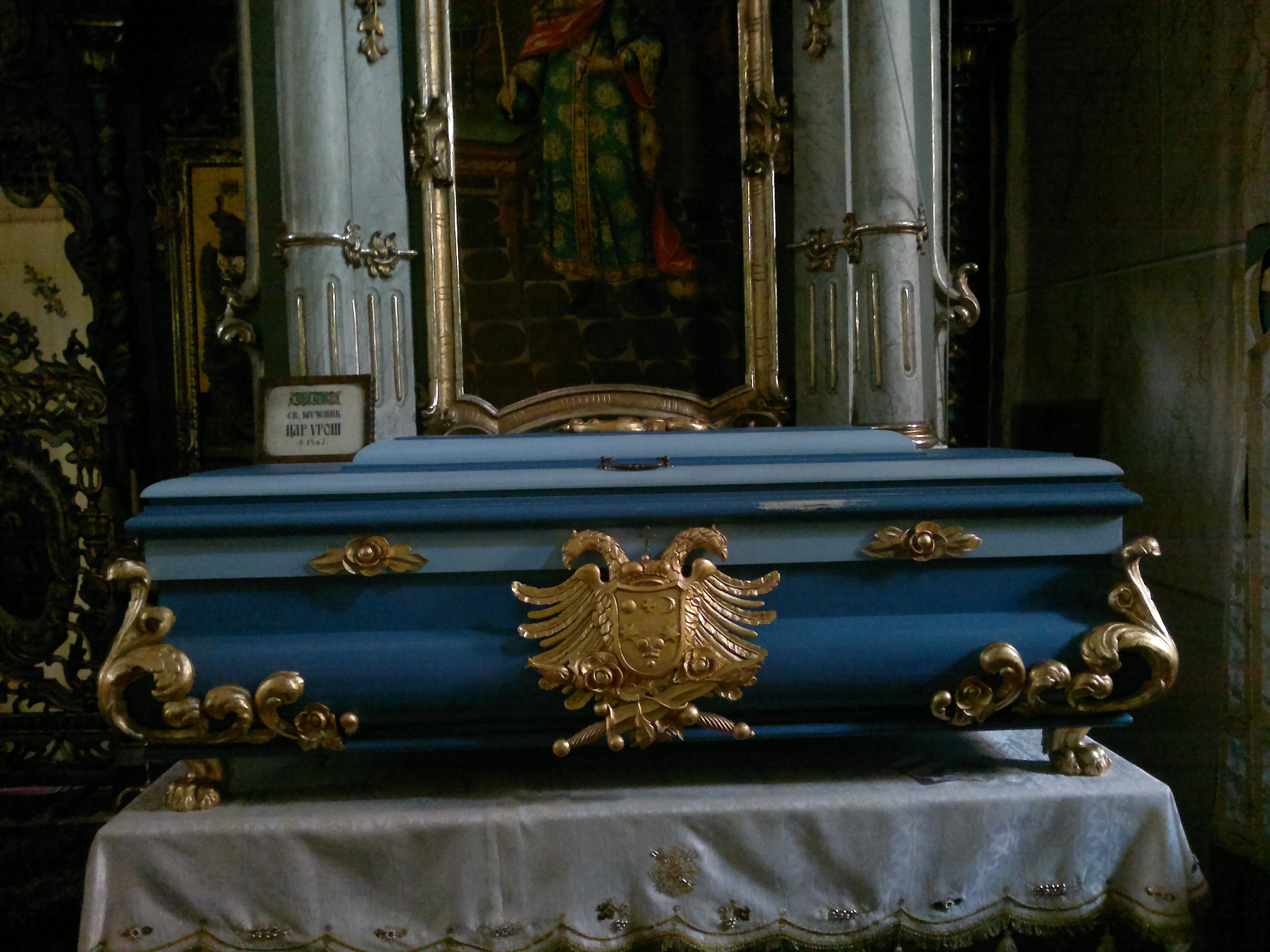
Relic case with relics of Uroš V, Jazak monastery.

Today, Stefan Uroš V is viewed mostly in contrast to his able and strong-willed father, as a lacking and indecisive ruler, unable to keep the Serbian nobility under his control, whose weak and unassertive personality greatly contributed to the fall of the Empire and the eventual destruction of the Serbian state by the Ottomans. In Serbian folklore and epic poems he is often described as a just, well-intentioned ruler of pleasant appearance but weak character. While this view is popular among historians as well, some argue that he was not especially incompetent in his role as Emperor of Serbia, and that the decline of the empire was much less spectacular and started much later into his rule than popular opinion suggests. For a long time, it was considered a historical fact that he was murdered by his co-ruler, Vukašin Mrnjavčević, but eventually Vukašin was proven to have died before the Emperor.

In 1825 Stefan Stefanović, a Serbian writer living in the Austrian Empire wrote a tragic play called The Death of Uroš V, which drew inspiration from both facts and folk tradition about Uroš, including the aforementioned belief that he was killed by King Vukašin.

== See also ==
- List of Serbian monarchs
- Serbian nobility conflict (1369)
- History of Serbia

== Sources ==
- Ćirković, Sima (2004). The Serbs. Malden: Blackwell Publishing. ISBN 9781405142915.
- Dvornik, Francis (1962). The Slavs in European History and Civilization. New Brunswick, New Jersey: Rutgers University Press.
- Fine, John Van Antwerp Jr. (1994) [1987]. The Late Medieval Balkans: A Critical Survey from the Late Twelfth Century to the Ottoman Conquest. Ann Arbor, Michigan: University of Michigan Press. ISBN 0472082604.
- Gavrilović, Zaga (2001). Studies in Byzantine and Serbian Medieval Art. London: The Pindar Press. ISBN 9781899828340.
- Mihaljčić, Rade (1975). Крај Српског царства [End of the Serbian Empire]. Belgrade: Srpska književna zadruga.
- Mihaljčić, Rade (1989). Крај Српског царства [End of the Serbian Empire] (2nd ed.). Belgrade: Beogradski izdavačko-grafički zavod.
- Nicol, Donald M. (1993) [1972]. The Last Centuries of Byzantium, 1261-1453. Cambridge: Cambridge University Press. ISBN 9780521439916.
- Nicol, Donald M. (1996). The Reluctant Emperor: A Biography of John Cantacuzene, Byzantine Emperor and Monk, c. 1295-1383. Cambridge: Cambridge University Press. ISBN 9780521522014.
- Ostrogorsky, George (1956). History of the Byzantine State. Oxford: Basil Blackwell.
- Popović, Tatyana (1988). Prince Marko: The Hero of South Slavic Epics. New York: Syracuse University Press. ISBN 9780815624448.
- Sedlar, Jean W. (1994). East Central Europe in the Middle Ages, 1000-1500. Seattle: University of Washington Press. ISBN 9780295800646.
- Soulis, George Christos (1984). The Serbs and Byzantium during the reign of Tsar Stephen Dušan (1331-1355) and his successors. Washington: Dumbarton Oaks Library and Collection. ISBN 9780884021377.
- Šuica, Marko (2000). Немирно доба српског средњег века. Властела српских обласних господара. Službeni list SRJ. ISBN 978-86-355-0452-0.
- Translated with small changes from small encyclopedia "Sveznanje" published by "Narodno delo", Belgrade, in 1937 which is today in public domain.

Regnal titles
Preceded by Stefan Dušan	Emperor of the Serbs; 1355–1371	John Uroš
Preceded by Stefan Dušan	King of Serbia; 1346–1355	Vacant Title next held by Vukašin
