= Roman of Đunis =

Serbian 9th century saint

Saint Roman of Đunis

Venerable Father; The Wonderworker
- Born: Unknown (c. 9th century), likely Byzantine Empire or First Bulgarian Empire; (according to folklore) the Sinai
- Died: c. 888-900; Đunis, First Bulgarian Empire, (present-day Serbia)
- Venerated in: Eastern Orthodox Church
- Major shrine: Monastery of St. Roman
- Feast: 29 August (Gregorian calendar), 16 August (Julian calendar)
- Attributes: Depicted wearing a monastic habit, gray bearded, clutching unfurled scroll with rosary or holding a gospel book
- Patronage: People with mental and physical disorder or other illnesses, the orphaned and destitute, Serbian Orthodox Church, Eparchy of Niš, Prince Lazar of Serbia and Princess Milica of Serbia

Saint Roman of Đunis (Serbian: Свети Роман Ђунишки; Sveti Roman Đuniški), or Roman The Wonderworker (c. 9th century) was a medieval enlightener and missionary to the Slavs, monk and saint. He is associated with the proselytism of Christianity, spread of literacy and introduction of monasticism amongst the Serbs.

The life of Roman of Đunis is the subject of several differing hagiographies. According to Orthodox Christian tradition Roman, alongside his brother Nestor Sinait Vitkovački were amongst 3,500 disciples of Saint Clement of Ohrid and Saint Naum tasked with continuing the evangelising of the South Slavs in their native language as commissioned by Saints Cyril and Methodius. He worked primarily in what is today southern Serbia, establishing a monastery in 888 before succumbing to death some time afterwards. Whilst another tradition associates Roman as a contemporary of the 11th century saints Prohor of Pčinja, John of Rila, Joachim of Osogovo and Gabriel of Lesnovo.

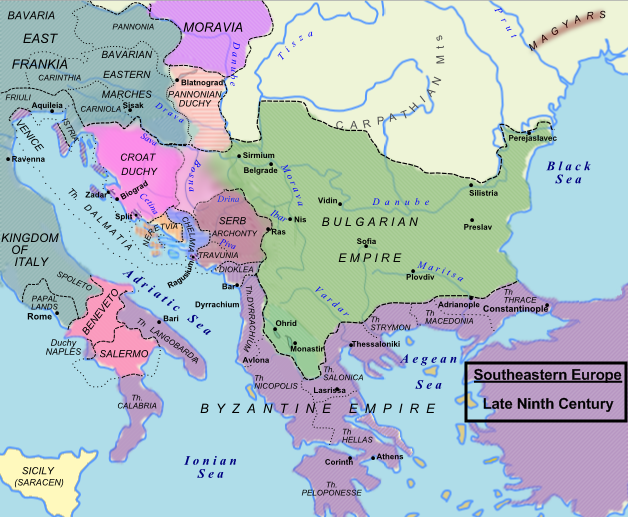
Southeastern Europe in the 9th century.

Serbian folklore also postulates that Roman arrived in Serbia in the 14th century, during the reign of Prince Lazar. One from a group of holy monks originally from the Sinai and Mount Athos, for this reason he is also known as the Venerable Father Roman the Sinaite (Serbian: Преподобри Роман Синајит; Prepodobri Roman Sinajit.

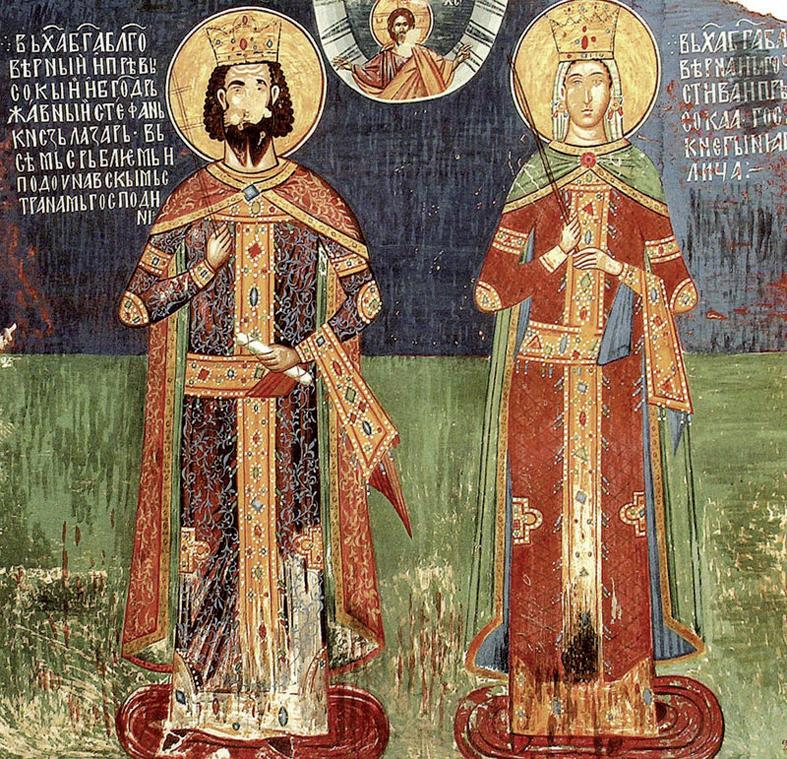
Prince Lazar and Princess Milica became patrons of Saint Roman following purported miracles at his shrine.

Roman of Djunis is venerated within the Serbian Orthodox Church as a miracle worker and healer. His relics are housed in the monastery which he founded. His feast day is celebrated on August 29 according to the Gregorian calendar (16 August according to the Julian calendar).

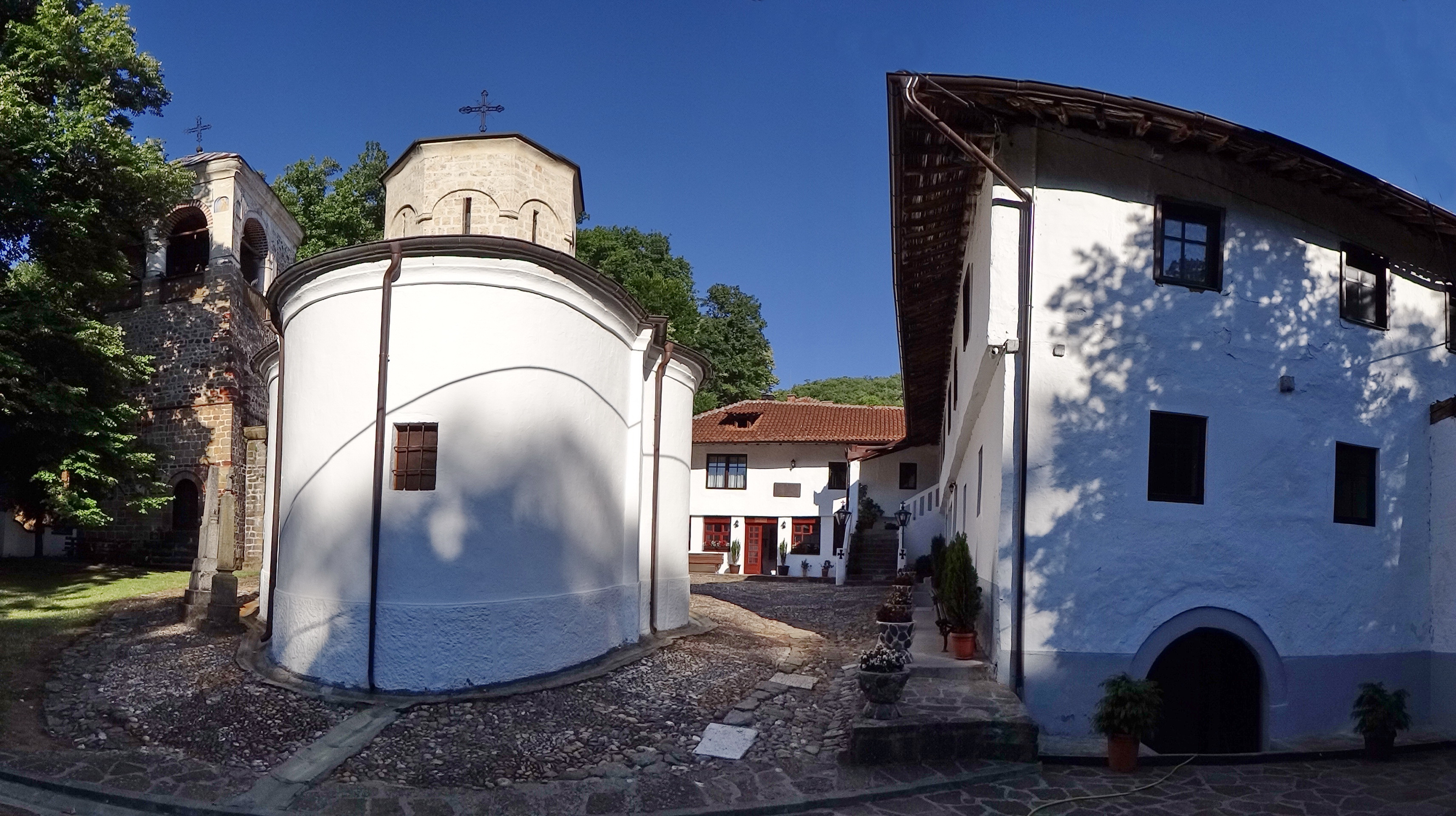
The Monastery of Saint Roman in Đunis, one of the oldest in Serbia and considered a monument of significant cultural heritage.

== See also ==
- Romylos of Vidin
- Gregory of Sinai
- Gregory of Sinai the Younger
- Nicodemus of Tismana
