= List of venerable people (Eastern Orthodox) =

In the Eastern Orthodox Church the term "Venerable" is commonly used as the English-language translation for the title that is given to monastic saints (Greek: Hosios, Church Slavonic: Prepodobny).

== Serbian ==
- Venerable Avakum (Deacon Avakum) - 30 December [O.S. 17 December]
- Venerable Anastasia of Serbia (Ana Nemanjić) - 6 July [O.S. 22 June]
- Venerable Angelina of Serbia (Angelina Branković) - 12 August [O.S. 30 July] and 23 December [O.S. 10 December]
- Venerable Visarion Saraj - 3 November [O.S. 21 October]
- Venerable Gavrilo of Lesnovo - 28 January [O.S. 15 January]
- Venerable Grigorije of Gornjak - 20 December [O.S. 7 December]
- Venerable David (Dmitar Nemanjić) - 7 October [O.S. 24 September]
- Venerable Jelena of Dečani (Ana-Neda) - 3 June [O.S. 21 May]
- Venerable Jelisaveta (Princess Jelena Štiljanović) - 17 October [O.S. 4 October]
- Venerable Jefrosinija (Jevgenija) (Princess Milica of Serbia) - 1 August [O.S. 19 July]
- Venerable Jeftimije of Dečani - 24 November [O.S. 11 November]
- Venerable Joachim of Osogovo - 29 August [O.S. 16 August]
- Venerable Joanikije II - 15 December [O.S. 2 December]
- Venerable Joasaph, Serbian Meteorite - 3 May [O.S. 20 April]
- Venerable Nestor of Dečani - 24 November [O.S. 11 November]
- Venerable Nicodemus of Tismana (Nikodim Grčić) - 8 January [O.S. 21 December]
- Venerable Prohor Pčinjski - 1 November [O.S. 19 October]
- Venerable Rafailo of Banat - 29 August [O.S. 16 August]
- Venerable Simeon the Monk (Stefan Nemanjić) - 7 October [O.S. 24 September]
- Venerable Sinaites: Romylos of Vidin, Roman, Nestor, Martirije, Sisoje, Zosim of Tuman and Jov - 19 May [O.S. 6 May]
- Venerable Stephen of Piperi - 2 June [O.S. 20 May]
- Venerable Teoktist (Stefan Dragutin) - 12 November [O.S. 30 October]

== See also ==
- List of Eastern Orthodox saints
- List of Eastern Orthodox saint titles
- Venerable
