= Lesnovo Monastery =

Monastery in North Macedonia

Coordinates: 42.0133°N 22.2283°E

Lesnovo monastery Лесновски манастир
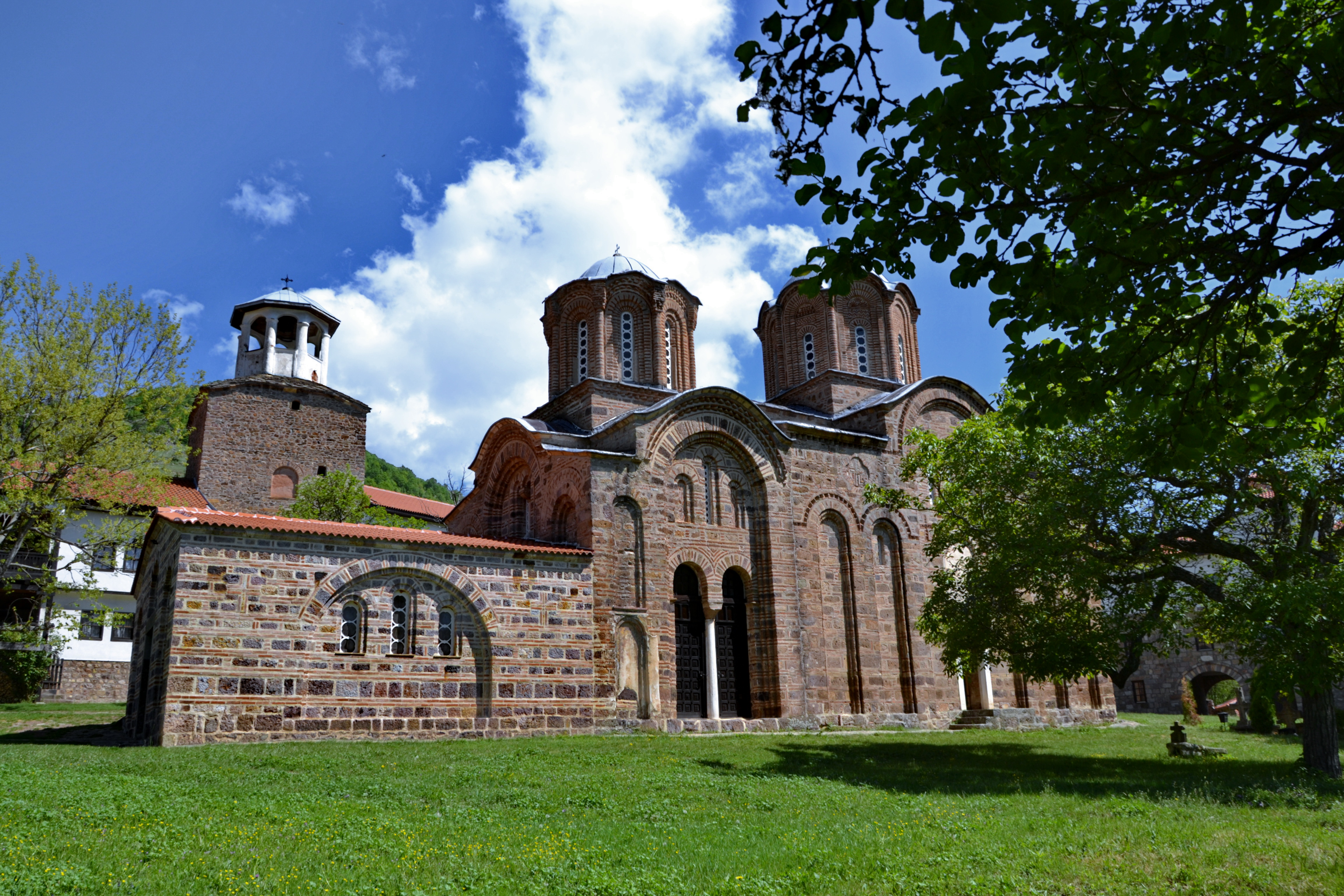
- Lesnovo monastery
- Interactive map of Lesnovo monastery Лесновски манастир

Monastery information
- Order: Macedonian Orthodox Church (Eastern Orthodox Church)
- Established: 14th century
- Dedication: St Michael; St Gabriel of Lesnovo

People
- Founder: Jovan Oliver

Site
- Location: village Lesnovo, North Macedonia
- Public access: Yes

Lesnovo monastery, officially called Monastery of St Archangel Michael and St Hermit Gabriel of Lesnovo (Macedonian Cyrillic: Свети Архангел Михаил и пустиножителот Гаврил Лесновски), is a medieval monument in North Macedonia. It is perhaps the best preserved endowment of a Serbian noble of the 14th century, with well-preserved frescoes.

== Location ==
The monastery is located on the south-west slopes of Mt Osogovo, in the middle of a volcanic crater. It lies at the beginning of Lesnovo village, at the height of 870 meters. The closest townlet is Zletovo which together with Lesnovo belongs to the municipality of Probištip.

== Beginnings ==
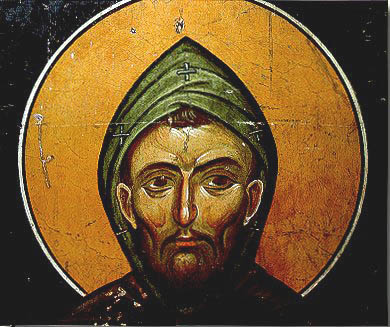
St Gabriel of Lesnovo, a fresco from Lesnovo

The monastery is located in a secluded region which was popular with hermits of the 11th century. One of them, the Bulgarian hermit Gabriel of Lesnovo, lived in the local caves and died there as well.

It remains still unsolved whether Gabriel founded a monastery or was it founded on the spot close to his hermitage. Very little is known of this original monastery since Gabriel's relics were taken away and the first and only mention of the old monastery comes only from 1330 in a chronicle by its monk Stanislav, a famous writer.

== New beginning ==
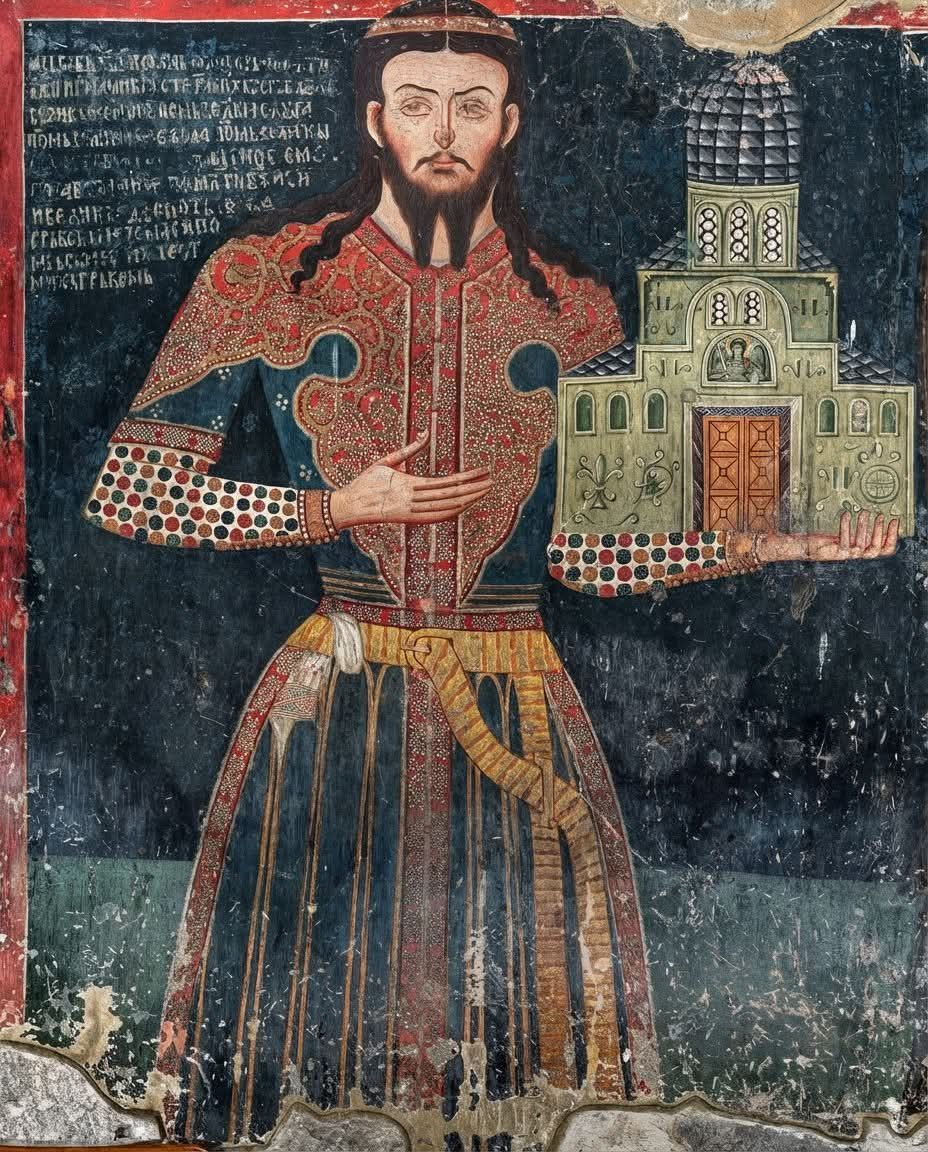
Portrait of Despotes Jovan Oliver with the church of St Michael in his hands

The new monastic complex known today was founded in 1341 by Despotes Jovan Oliver Grčinić, a magnate of Serbian kingdom who owned the surrounding area. Jovan Oliver built a church dedicated to St Michael as well as new dwellings and bestowed a charter to Lesnovo in which he lists its numerous possessions. The monastery became immediately very rich, attracting a large and well educated fraternity. Next year (1342) Oliver gave the monastery with all its belongings to Chilandar, the highly revered Serbian monastery on Holy Mount Athos.

In the Serbian state assembly held in Skopje in 1347 Emperor Dušan pronounced Lesnovo monastery as the seat of the newly established Zletovo bishopric. The new bishopric was intended to fill in the gap of the old, non-functional Morozvizd bishopric. Lesnovo received a new charter by which it was released from the power of Chilandar, got new villages and freed the peasants in them from state duties. As its founder, Jovan Oliver retained the right to appoint the abbot and to be present at the election of the bishop of Zletovo. Most importantly, as the new seat of the bishopric the monastery church was enlarged with a narthex.

From this period it is known that a number of hermitages (usually the number 16 is mentioned) operated in the caves around the monastery. Many from the numerous fraternity were also living as hermits, including the first bishop, Arsenije I, who was buried in one of them.

We know little of what happened with Lesnovo in the tumulus years after Dušan's (1355) and his son, Uroš's death (1371). In 1381, the local lord Konstantin Dejanović issued a third charter giving Lesnovo back to Chilandar and placing it under the supervision of the bishop of Velbužd, his capital.

== Under Ottoman rule ==
During the Ottoman onslaught the monastery was not destroyed but it is possible that late in 15th century its fraternity was dispersed for some time.

The first renovation of a neglected monastery came in 1558, just one year after the Serbian Patriarchate of Peć was restored. The reconstruction undertaken by its abbot Neofit in that year opened a series of works by the rich people from the nearby mining town of Kratovo that at the time flourished itself. In 1581 duke Nikola Bojčić recovered the monastery with lead and in 1588 duke Nikola Pepić (brother of duke Dimitrije Pepić) built the outer narthex. Monastery also got new dwellings, books as well as new possessions.

In this period the monastery once became once more the seat of the bishopric. Later in 17th and the following centuries the monastery was subordinated to the bishop of Kratovo-Štip or that of Ćustendil.

In one Ottoman document from 1618 we learn that the monks assisted the brigands and some of them even joined their ranks. From 1664 the monastery receives help from Russia.

After the defeat of a local uprising in support of the advancing Habsburg army the monks had to flee Lesnovo and the monastery was looted. It was renovated in 18th century but by its end it was again abandoned. A thorough renovation came after in 1805 monastic life was reestablished by monk Teodosije from Visoki Dečani monastery. In 19th century Lesnovo got famous for a number of valuable manuscripts that were sold by monks and that have reached many libraries (Belgrade, Sofia, St Petersburg...).

== Today ==
The monastery is still active with a small fraternity. It belongs to the Macedonian Orthodox Church.

== Architecture ==
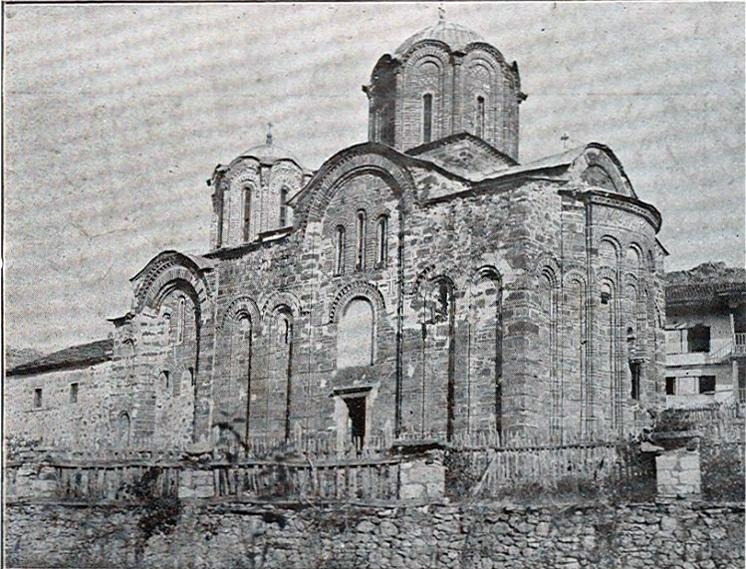
Lesnovo monastery in 1912

The oldest part of the church, from 1341, is in form of an inscribed cross with a dome above its center. Its architecture follows Byzantine cannons with alternate layers of brick and stone and decorative arches in two levels (similar to the Church of St Michael in Štip).

The narthex, since it was built only a few years later (1347) forms a harmonious whole with same decoration of walls, a smaller dome above it and three double bay entrances.

The westernmost part is the much lower addition by duke Nikola Pepić from 1588. Deemed of much less worthy architecture, it was destroyed in the mid-20th century, only to be recently rebuilt in its original form.

== Fresco painting ==
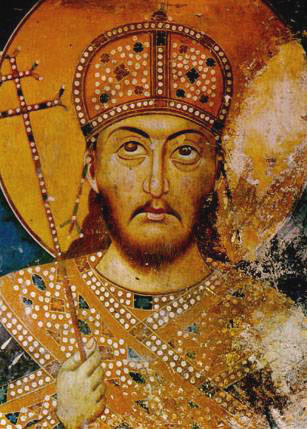
Portrait of Emperor Dušan

Similarly to its architecture, the wall paintings of Lesnovo all come from a short time span. The original church was painted in 1346–47, the narthex in 1349. There were four painters of whom are known the names of the three, inscribed in medallions (Sevasto, Mihail and Marko). One of them has also painted his self-portrait, seated by the river of knowledge coming from the teachings of one of the Church Fathers. Although painted in just several years the frescoes of Lesnovo show all the stylistic diversity of the current styles of painting. While some of the paintings in the nave follow the classicist examples from the beginning of the 14th century with their calm composition and mild color contrast, the painter of the cycle on St Michael emphasized movement and drama of the events, painting them in bright colors.

Many of the paintings show rare or even unique depictions or iconographic solutions such as the red painted St Michael on a horse, represented as a commander of God's army or a cycle of archangels. More common is the grand composition of St Michael saving Constantinople from the Saracens. As depictions of king David's psalms there are interesting compositions of sun, moon and twelve zodiacal signs, a round dance to drums and cither and several other scenes from 14th-century life. On the walls of the church are also found the depictions of the three hermit monks from the area – Gabriel of Lesnovo, Joachim of Osogovo and Prohor of Pčinja – as well as the portraits of the founders of independent Serbian church, St Simeon and St Sava, which were common for each Serbian monastery.

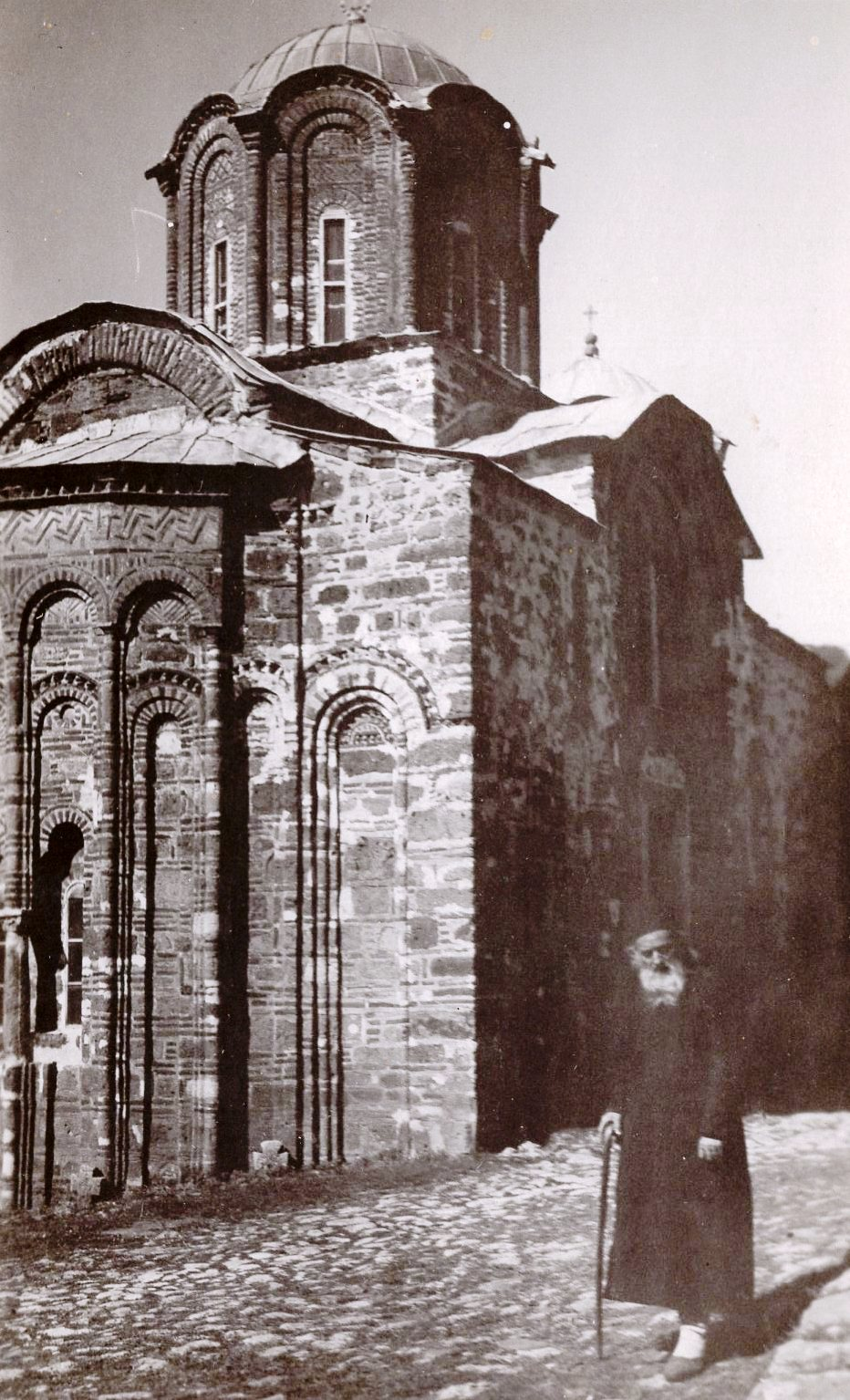
A monk in front of the monastery.

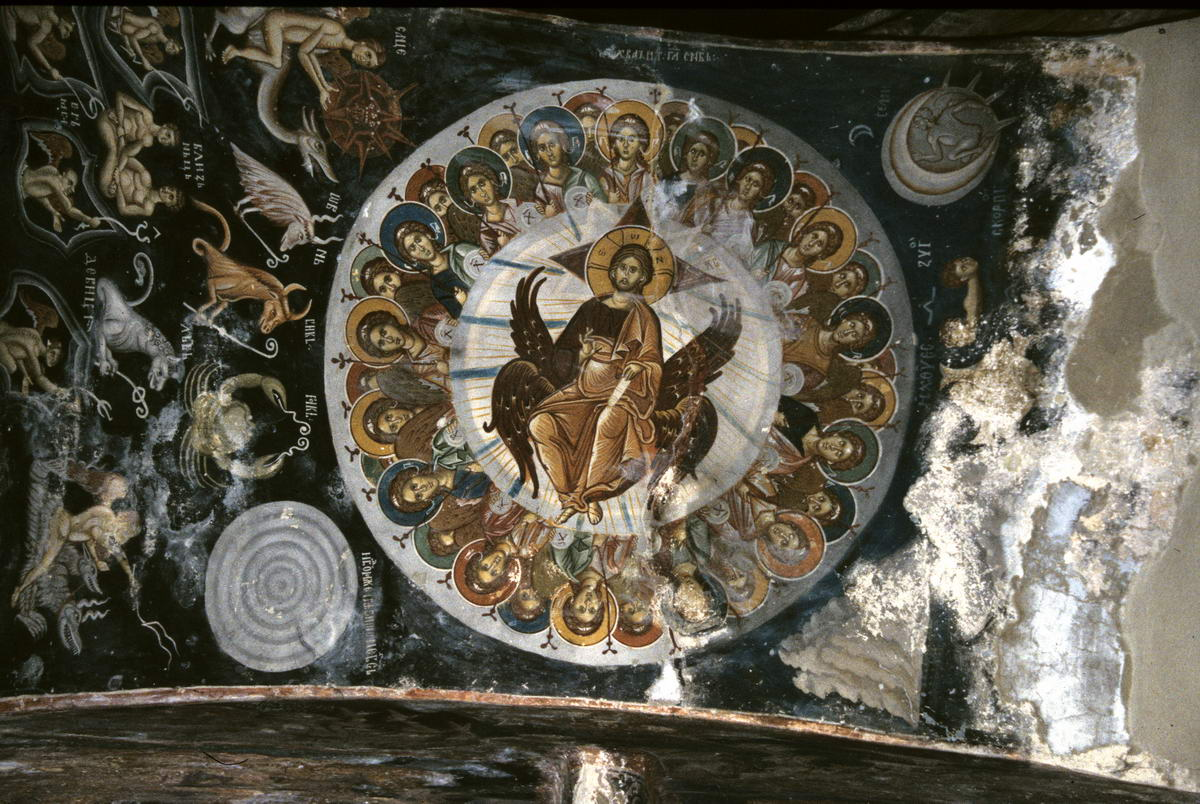
Illustration of Psalm 148

The portraits of historical figures are of equal importance. In the endower's composition one sees despot Jovan Oliver in elaborate dress of a magnate together with his wife. Next to his portrait is a longer inscription that lists his rise to position as one of the most powerful lords of Serbia – significant for the grading of baron's titles. Oliver's eyes were scratched by Bulgarian soldiers during the 1915–18 occupation of Macedonia.

In the outer narthex is a three-meter-tall painting of Emperor Dušan with his wife, Empress Jelena. This subtle psychological study of a 40-year-old mighty ruler is Dušan's most commonly reproduced portrait.

== Iconostasis ==
The large wooden iconostasis was done in 1811–14 by Petre Filipović and his band (tajfa) of woodcarvers from the Mijak clan in West Macedonia. This is the first of the four famous iconostases that this group carved. It is remarkable in its details and decoration. The icons are the work of masters of the Samokov school.

== Monastery complex ==
The monastic dwellings of the monastery date mostly to the renovation of the early 19th century. The high tower was built in the same period. In it is the bell cast in 1860 in Kragujevac and bears an inscription that it presents the donation of Prince Mihailo Obrenović of Serbia.

Next to the church grows a centuries-old mulberry tree, supposedly planted after the church was built in the 14th century.

== Gallery ==
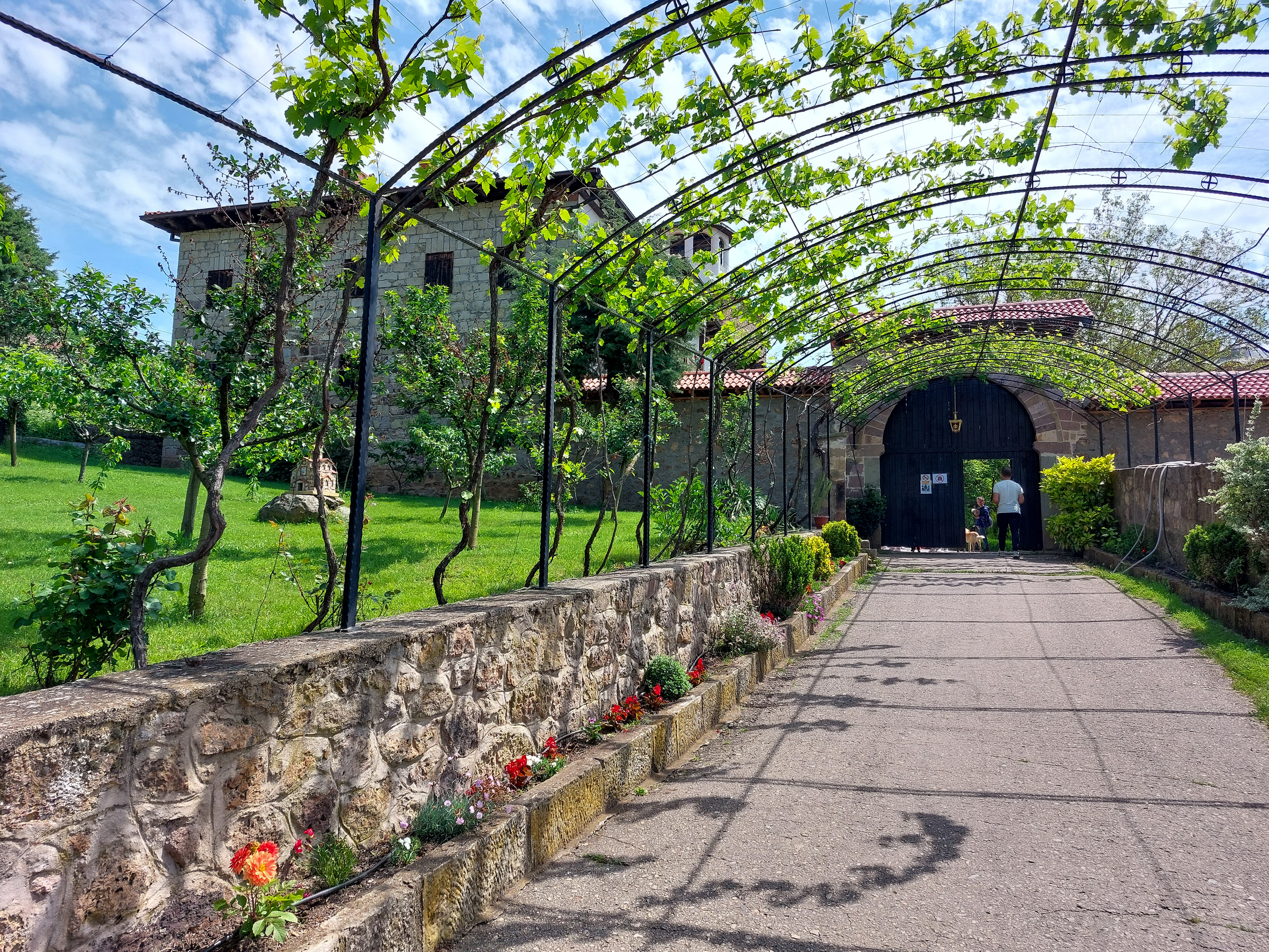
Entrance.

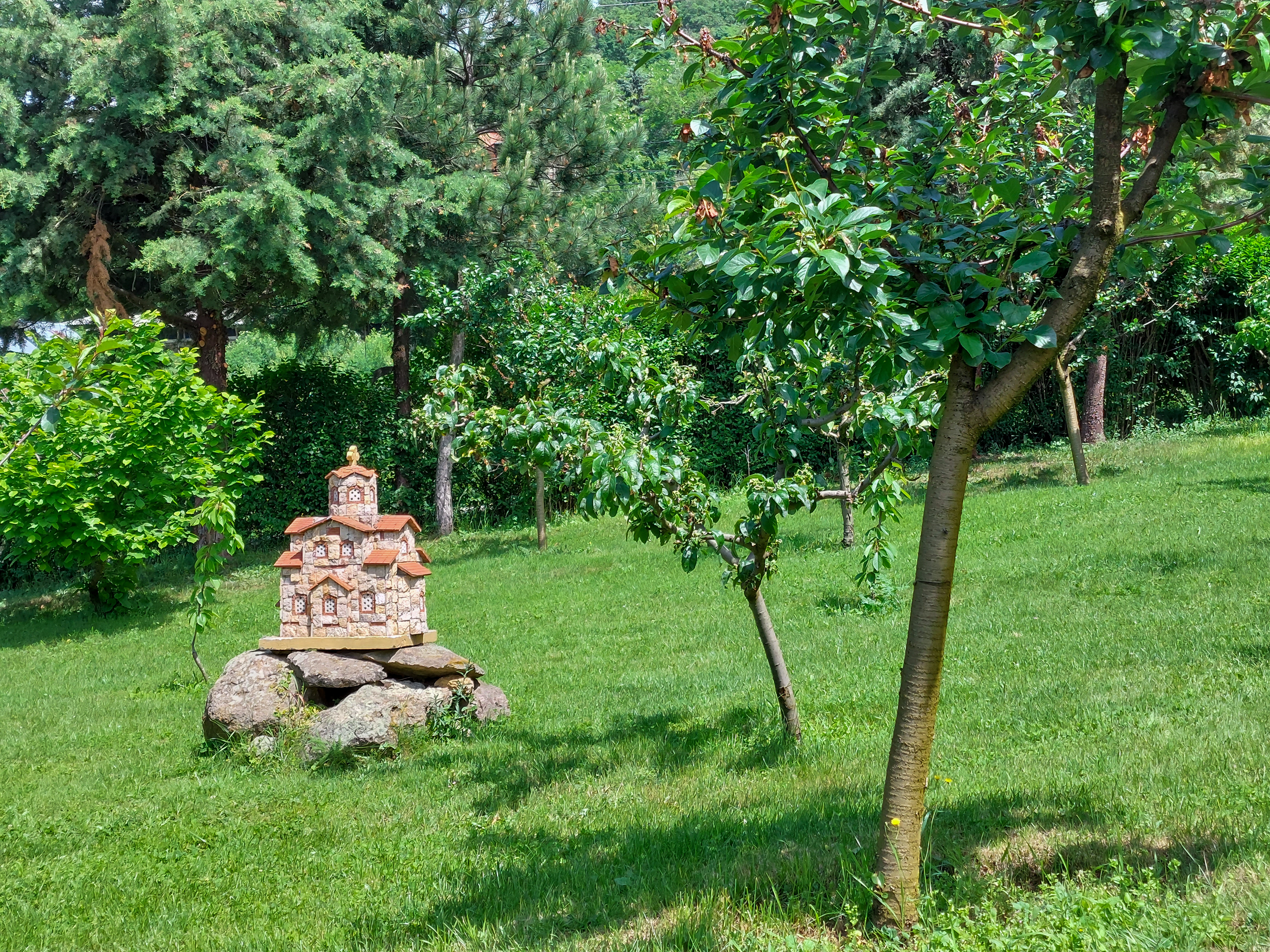

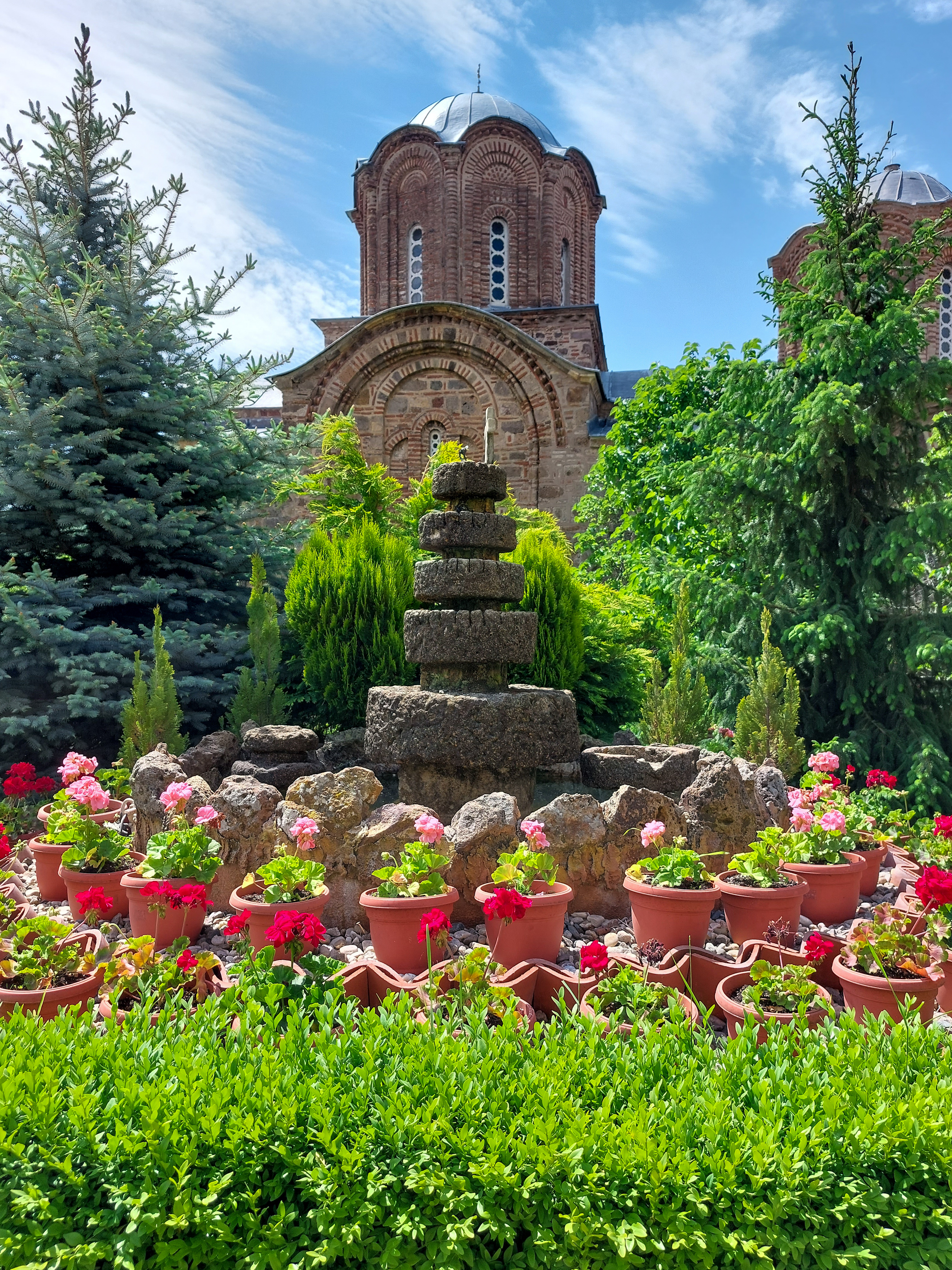

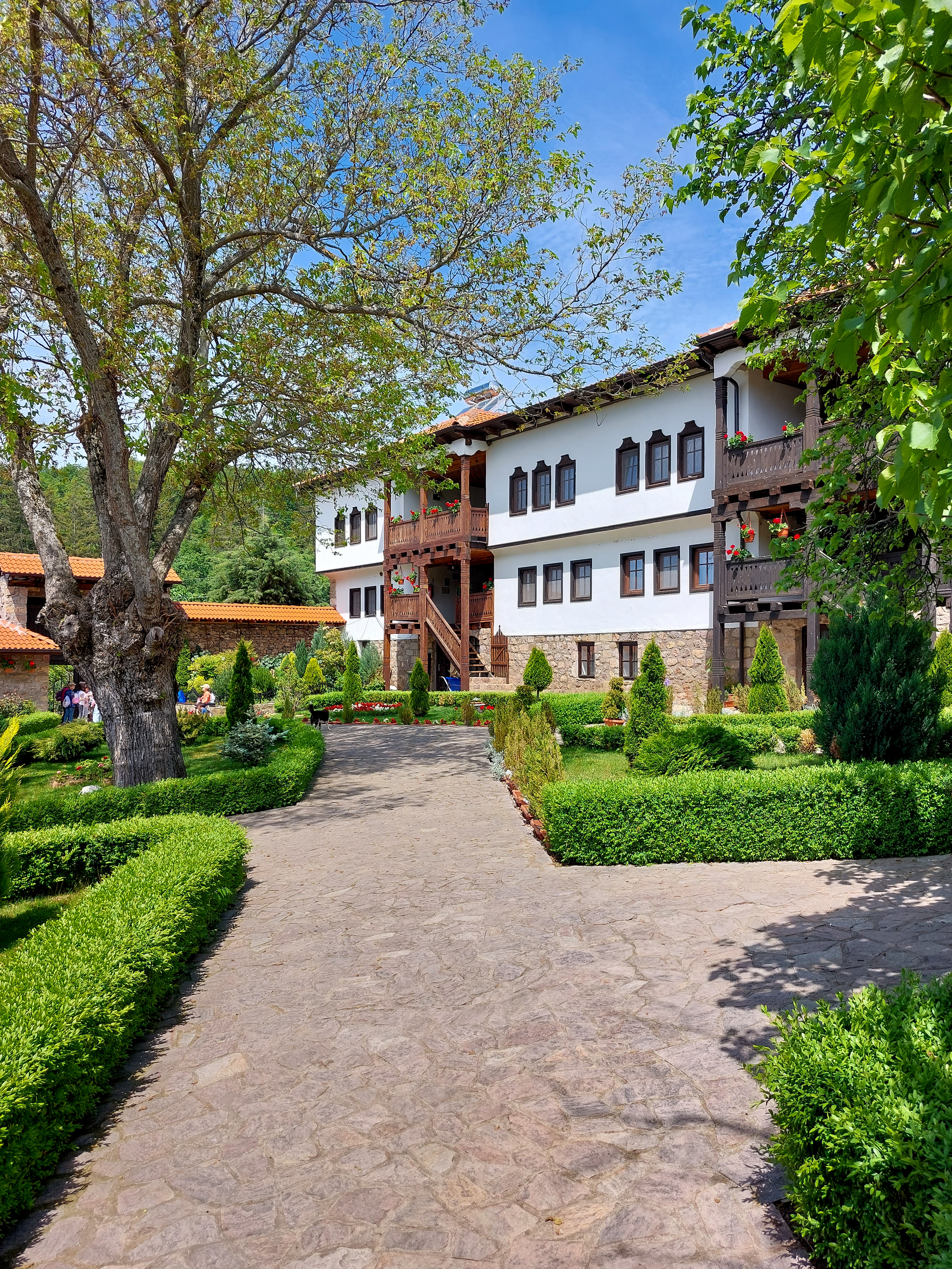

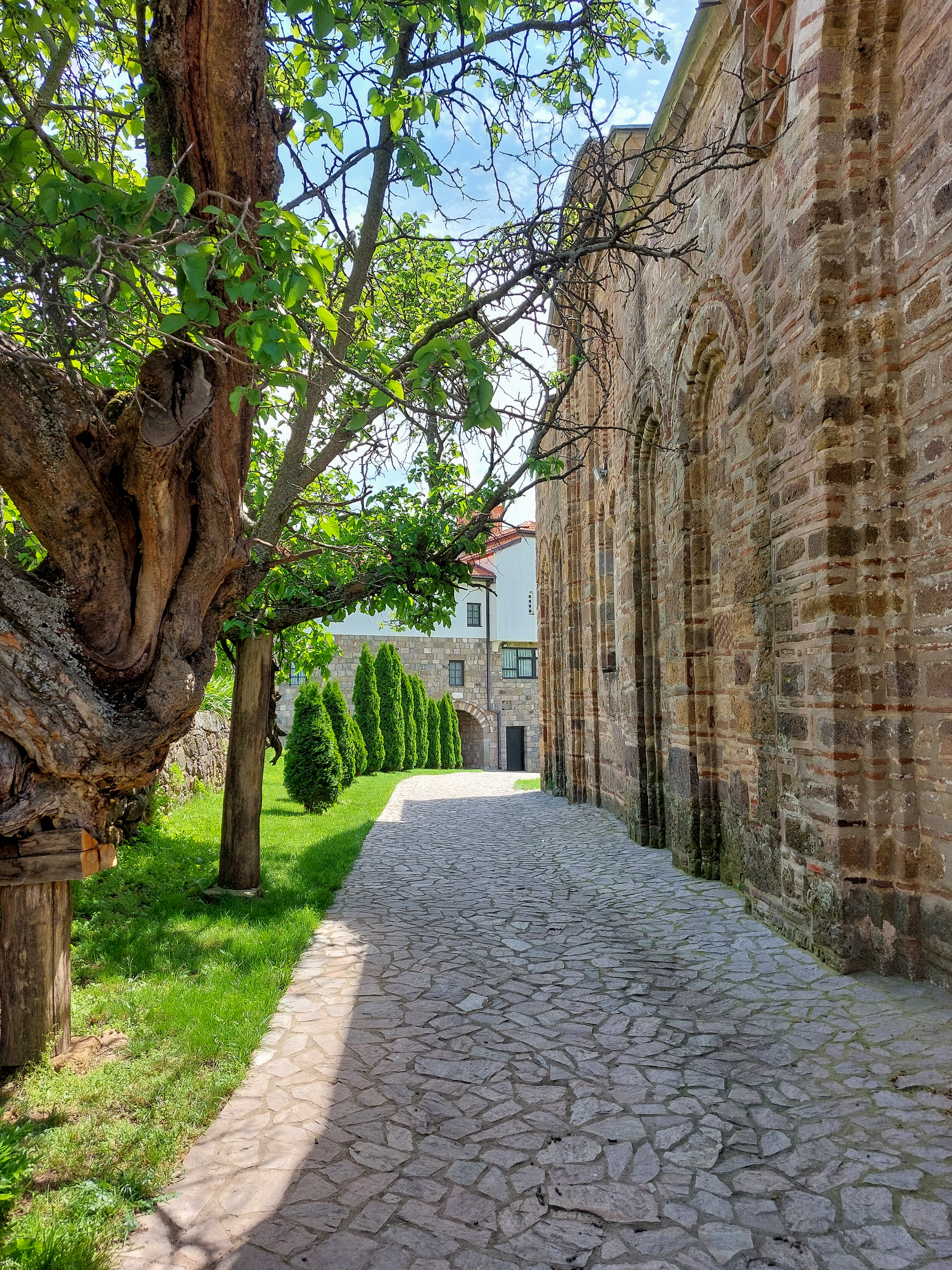

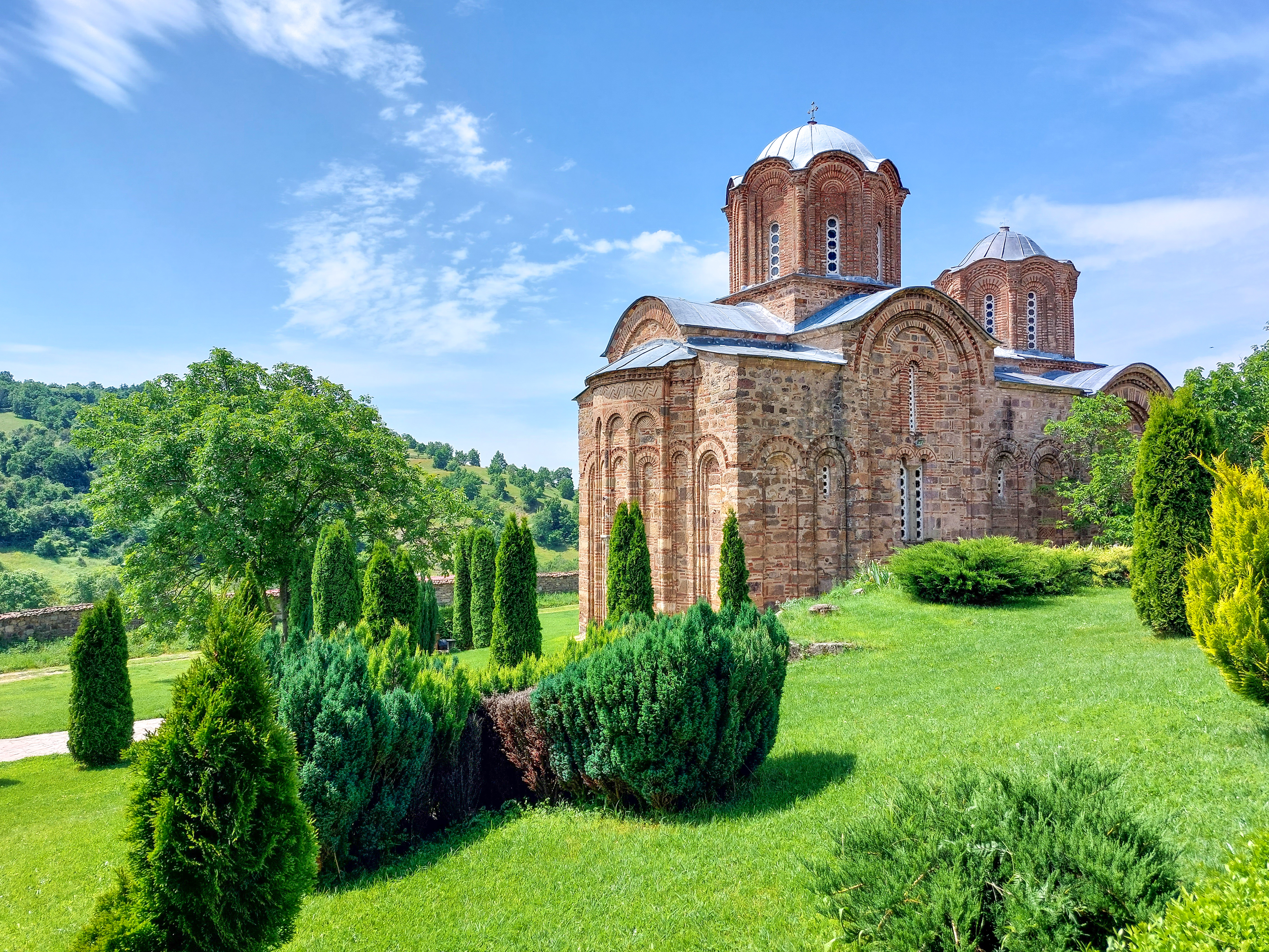

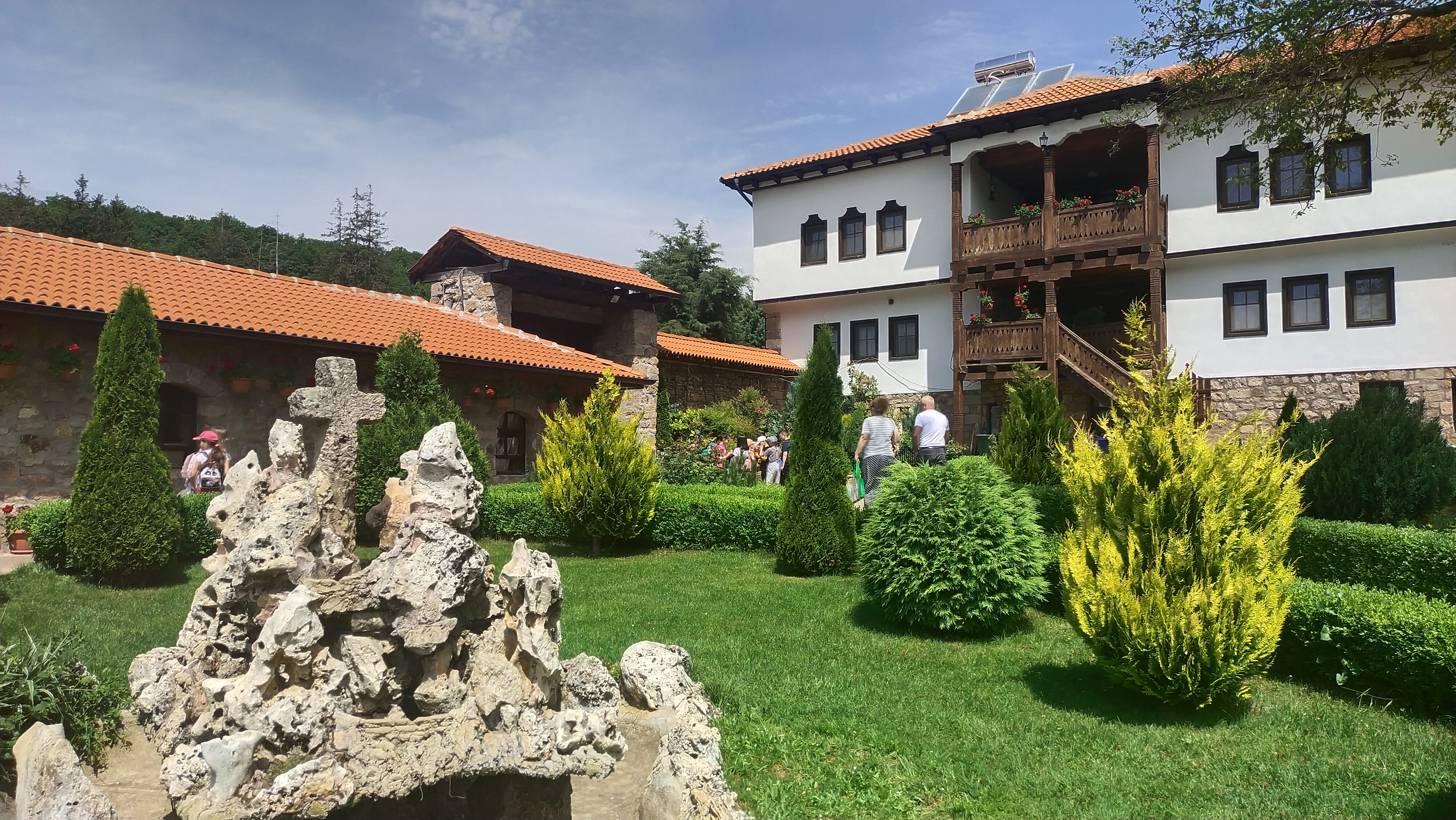

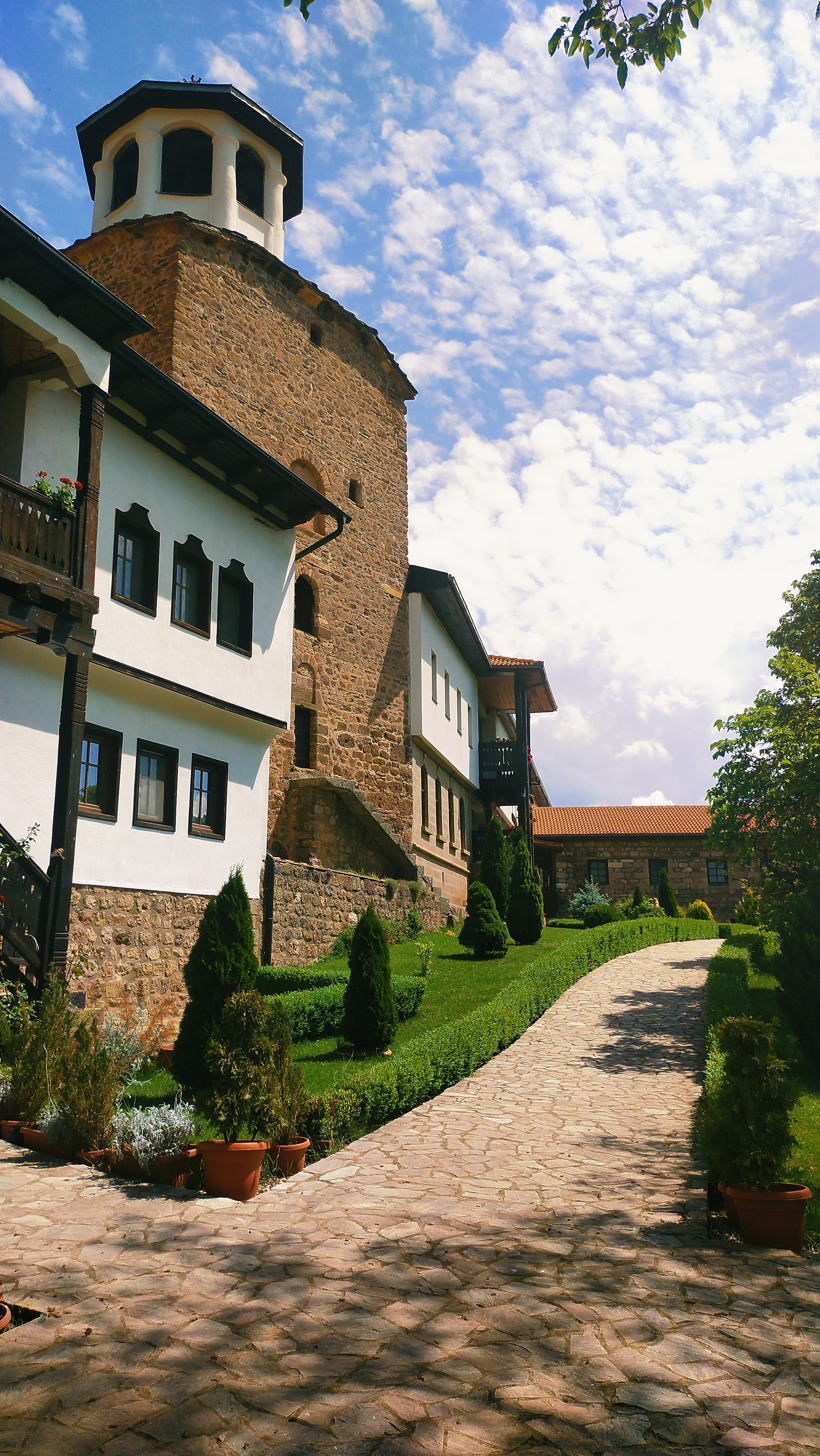

== See also ==
- Stanislav of Lesnovo

== Sources ==
- Kazhdan, A. (1991). The Oxford Dictionary of Byzantium. New York, Oxford: Oxford University Press. ISBN 0-19-504652-8.
