= October 19 (Eastern Orthodox liturgics) =

Day in the Eastern Orthodox liturgical calendar

Eastern Orthodox liturgical calendar
October 18	October 19	October 20
October 19 O.S. ≍ November 1 N.S. October 19 N.S ≍ October 6 O.S.

An Eastern Orthodox cross

October 19 in Eastern Orthodox liturgical calendars is a feast day and a day of commemoration of saints and martyrs. Although some Orthodox churches use the Revised Julian Calendar and others use the traditional Julian calendar, the fixed commemorations for their respective October 19 are broadly the same, no matter which calendar is used. (Note: Despite the dates being the same, the days to which they refer typically differ by 13 days. The notation Old Style or O.S. is sometimes used to indicate a date in the traditional Julian Calendar (the "Old Calendar"). The notation New Style or N.S. indicates a date in the Revised Julian calendar (the "New Calendar").)

== Saints ==
- Prophet Joel (800 BC)
- Saint Mnason of Tamassos, Cyprus, the early disciple, mentioned in Acts 21:15-16 (Note: See: Acts 21:15-16 New King James Version (NKJV): " And after those days we packed and went up to Jerusalem. Also some of the disciples from Caesarea went with us and brought with them a certain Mnason of Cyprus, an early disciple, with whom we were to lodge.") (see also: October 18 )
- Hieromartyr Felix the Presbyter and Eusebius the Deacon, by the sword.
- Martyrs Varus (Ouarus) and six (seven) others with him, in Egypt (c. 307) (Note: "In Egypt, St. Varus, soldier, under the emperor Maximinus. He used to visit and comfort seven saintly monks detained in prison, when one of them happening to die, he wished to take his place, and having suffered with them cruel afflictions, he obtained the palm of martyrdom.") (see also: February 28)
- Blessed Cleopatra (327) and her son John (320), in Egypt.
- Hieromartyr Sadoc (Sadoth), Bishop of Persia, and 120 martyrs with him (342)
- Saint Leontius the Philosopher, of St. Sabbas Monastery (624)
- Saint Prochorus of Pechenga (Pchinja), Abbot, in the Vranski Desert on the Pchinja river (10th century)

== Pre-Schism Western saints ==
- Martyrs Ptolemy and Lucius, martyrs in Rome under Antoninus Pius (c. 165) (Note: Ptolemy was put to death for instructing a woman in the Orthodox Faith. One Lucius and an unnamed man protested against the injustice of the sentence and were also martyred. Their story was written down by St Justin Martyr, their contemporary.) (Note: "At Rome, the birthday of the holy martyrs Ptolemy and Lucius, under Marcus Antoninus. The former, as we learn from the martyr Justin, having converted an immodest woman to the faith of Christ, and taught her to practise chastity, was accused by a profligate man before the prefect Urbicius, and condemned to languish a long time in a filthy dungeon. At length, as he declared by a public confession that Christ was his master, he was led to execution. Lucius disapproving the sentence of Urbicius, and avowing freely that he was a Christian, received the same sentence. To them was added a third, who was condemned to suffer a like punishment.")
- Saint Altinus (Attinus), founder of the churches of Orléans and Chartres in France and perhaps a martyr (4th century)
- Saint Eusterius, fourth Bishop of Salerno in Italy (5th century)
- Saint Lupus of Soissons, a nephew of St Remi of Rheims who became Bishop of Soissons (c. 540)
- Saint Veranus of Cavaillon, Bishop of Cavaillon (590)
- Saint Ethbin, monk, then hermit near Kildare, Ireland (c. 600) (Note: Born in Britain, he was a disciple of St Samson in Brittany. Ordained deacon, he served at the monastery of Taurac until it was destroyed by the Franks. He then went to Ireland and led the life of a hermit near Kildare.: See: (in French) Saint Yben. Wikipédia. (French Wikipedia).) (Note: "ST. ETHBIN was born in Great Britain, and went over to Continental Brittany to place himself under the guidance of his fellow-countryman St. Samson, Bishop of Dole. There he made great progress in virtue; but having one day heard in the Mass the words of the Gospel, "Everyone of you that doth not renounce all he possesseth cannot be My disciple," he felt himself, like the great St. Antony, called upon to make a complete renunciation of the world. Accordingly, with the prelate's approval, he retired to the Abbey of Tauroc, and lived under the conduct of Guinold, or Winwaloc the younger. About the year 560, this monastery was devastated by the Franks, and Ethbin took refuge in Ireland, and there built a small cell in a spot known as Necton Wood, where he lived in great sanctity, until, at the age of eighty-three, he was invited to his heavenly reward.") (Note: "S. Ethbin was the son of Eutius and Eula, a noble pair in Brittany. His father died when he was aged fifteen, and his mother then took the veil, and confided her son to S. Samson of Dol, who ordained him. Ethbin afterwards became a monk and disciple of S. Winwaloe at Tauriac, who is not to be confounded with S. Winwaloe of Llandevenec. He was privileged to see his master perform a very nasty but notable miracle, without his stomach being turned. When Tauriac was destroyed by the Franks, S. Ethbin went to Ireland, and there died, but whereabouts does not appear.")
- Saint Aquilinus of Évreux, Bishop of Evreux, Confessor (695) (Note: Born in Bayeux in France, he and his wife agreed to live by good works. They went to Evreux and Aquilinus was soon made bishop there. However, he managed to live more as a hermit than a pastor.)
- Saint Desiderius, a monk at Lonrey and a disciple of St Sigiranus, he became a hermit in La Brenne near Bourges, France (c. 705)
- Saint Theofrid (Theofroy, Chaifre), Abbot of Carmery-en-Velay (Monastier-Saint-Chaffre), martyred by invading Saracens (728)
- Saint Frideswide of Oxford, Royal Abbess, patroness saint of Oxford (c. 735) (Note: Daughter of a prince of the Upper Thames, she founded a convent dedicated to the Virgin on the site of what is now Christchurch in Oxford. From childhood she took as her maxim 'Whatever is not God is nothing'. She is the patroness saint of Oxford.)
- Saint Laura of Cordoba, a nun at Santa María de Cuteclara de Córdoba, martyred by the Moors by being thrown into a cauldron of molten lead (864)
- Saint Eadnoth the Younger (Ednoth, Eadnot), successively Abbot of Ramsey and Bishop of Dorchester (1016) (Note: A monk at Worcester and Abbot of Ramsey in England. In 1006 he became Bishop of Dorchester. He was killed by the Danes and is sometimes called a martyr.)

== Post-Schism Orthodox saints ==
- New Monk-martyr Nicholas Dvali of Jerusalem (1314) (see also: February 12 )
- Venerable Serapion of Kozheozersky Monastery (1611) (see also: June 27)
- Saint Gabriel, Archimandrite (Abbot) of St. Elias Skete, Mount Athos (1901)
- Righteous John of Kronstadt, Wonderworker (1908) (see also December 20)
- Saint Anthony (Abashidze), Schema-Archbishop, of the Kyiv Caves Lavra (1942)

=== New Martys and Confessors ===
- New Hieromartyr Alexis Stavrovsky, Priest, of Petrograd (1918)
- New Hieromartyr Sergius Pokrovsky, Priest (1937)

== Other commemorations ==
- First translation (1187) of the relics of Venerable John of Rila, founder of Rila Monastery in Bulgaria (946)
- Synaxis of the icon of "Panagia Vasilissa" ("Panagia the Queen"), in Mouzaki, Karditsa, Greece.

== Icon gallery ==
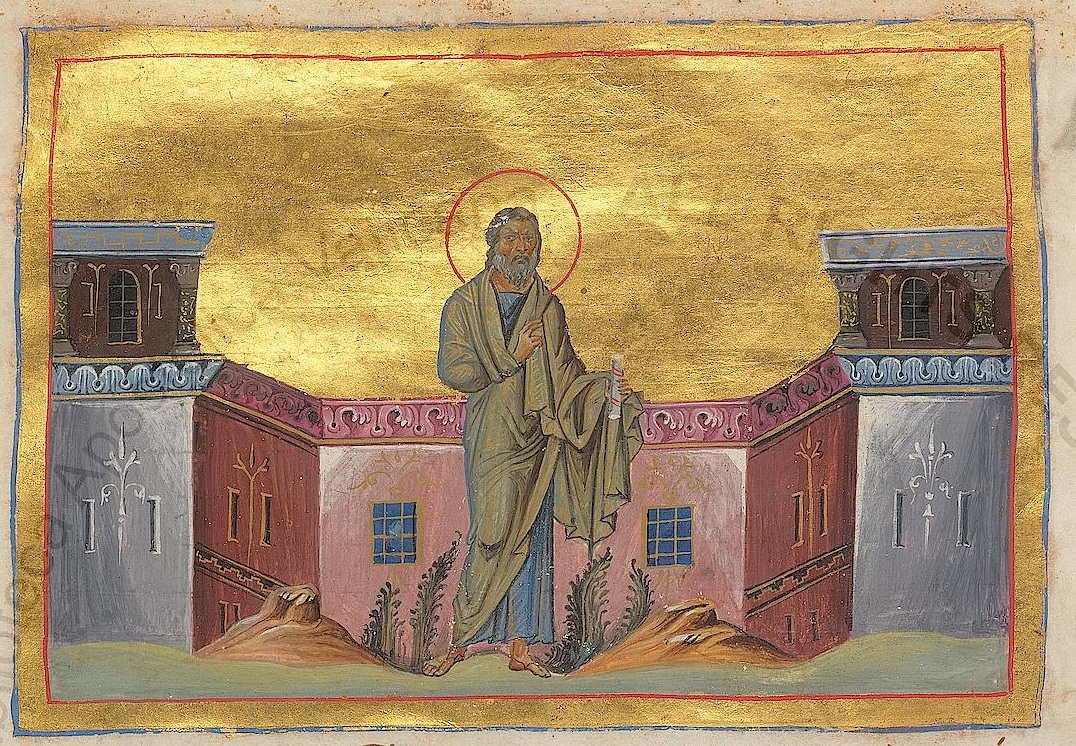
Prophet Joel.
(Menologion of Basil II, 10th century).

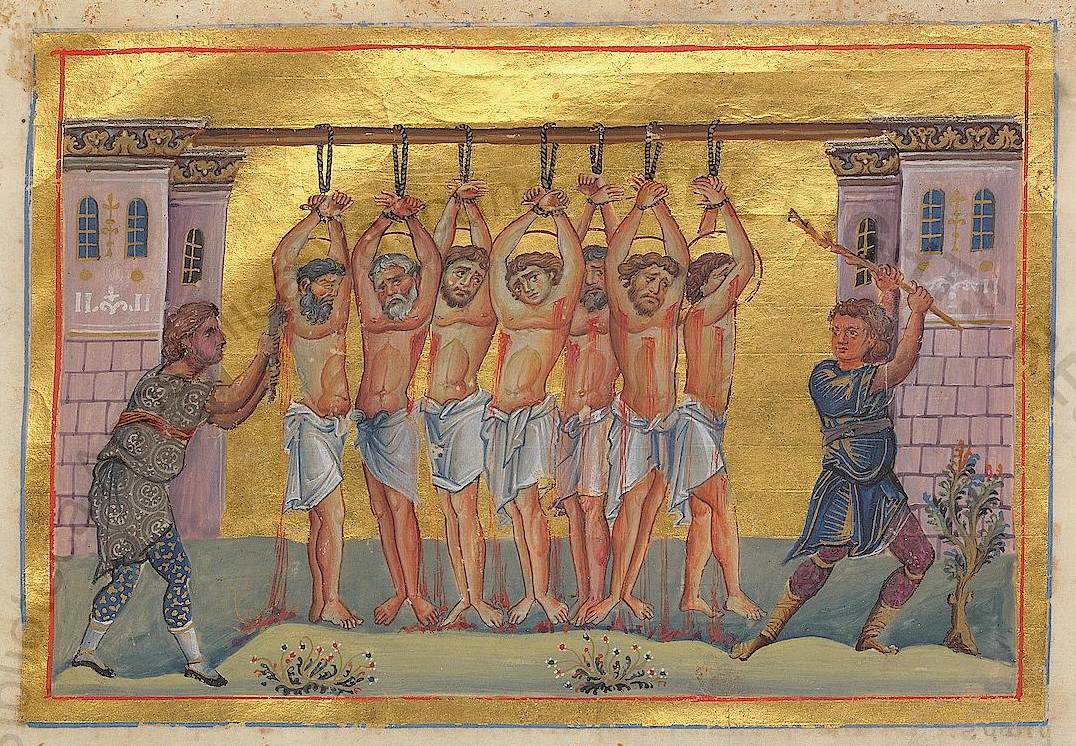
Martyrs Varus and six others with him, in Egypt.
(Menologion of Basil II, 10th century).

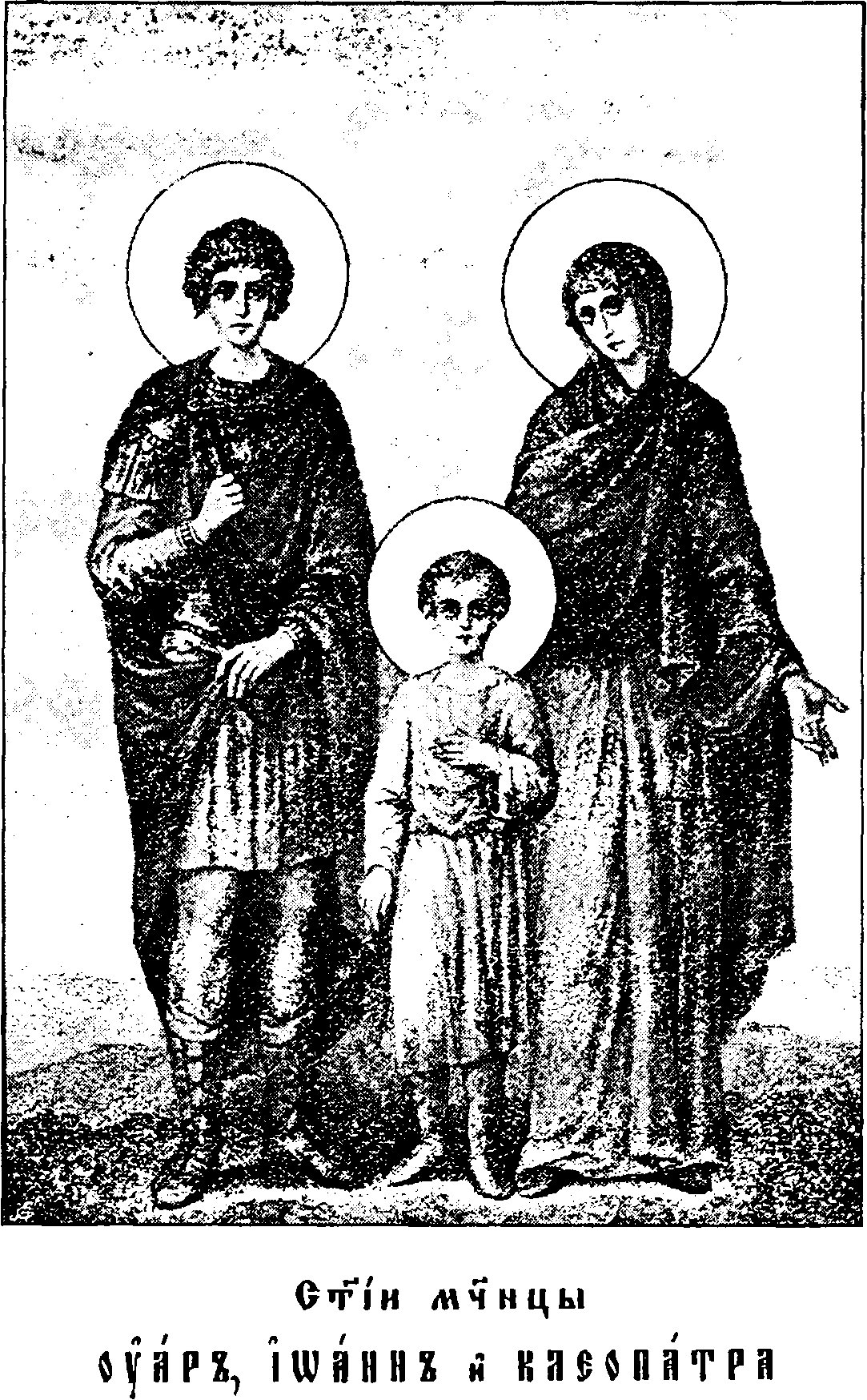
Martyrs Varus, with St. Cleopatra and her son John.

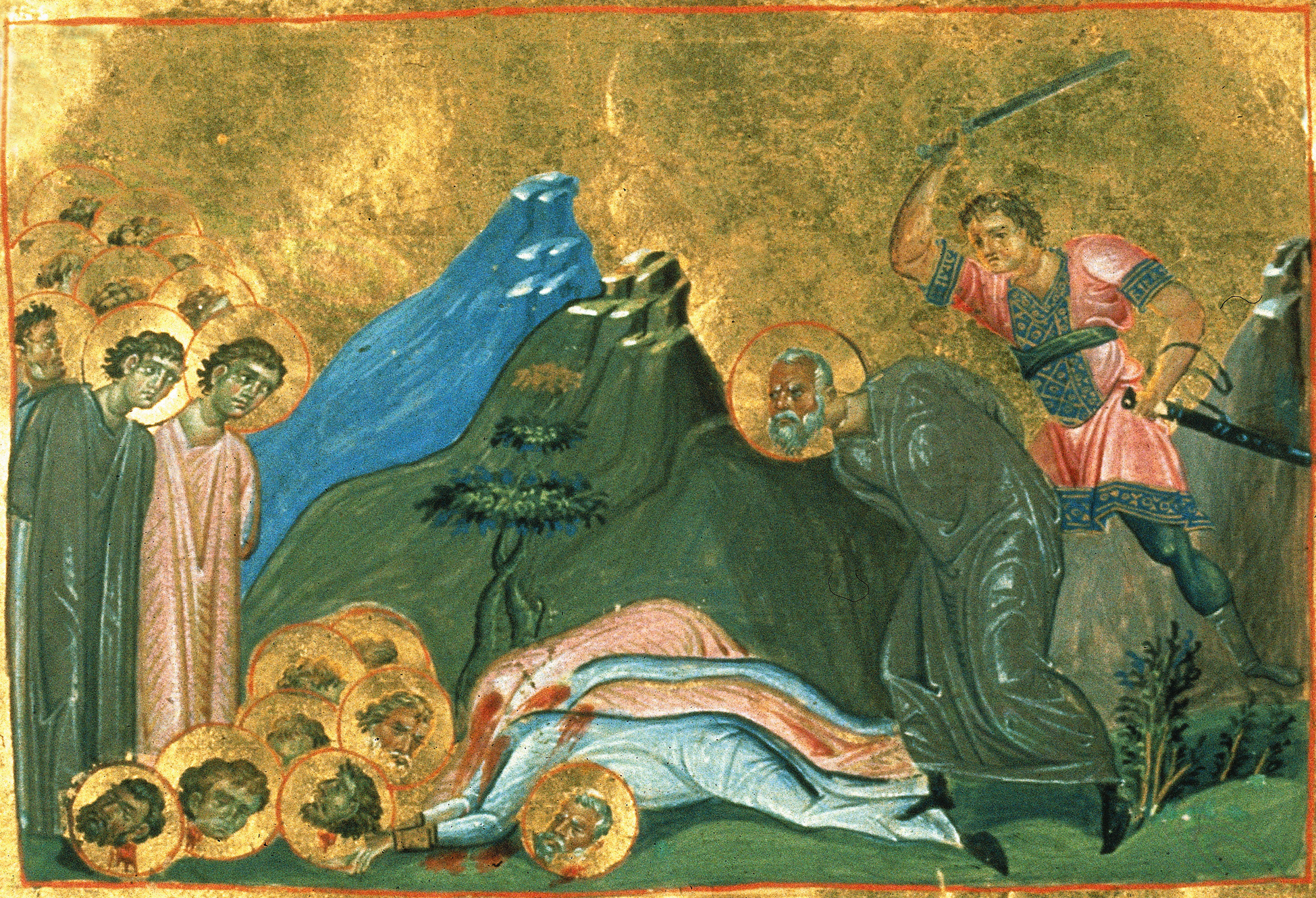
Martyr Sadoc (Sadoth), Bishop of Persia, and 120 martyrs with him.
(Menologion of Basil II, 10th century).

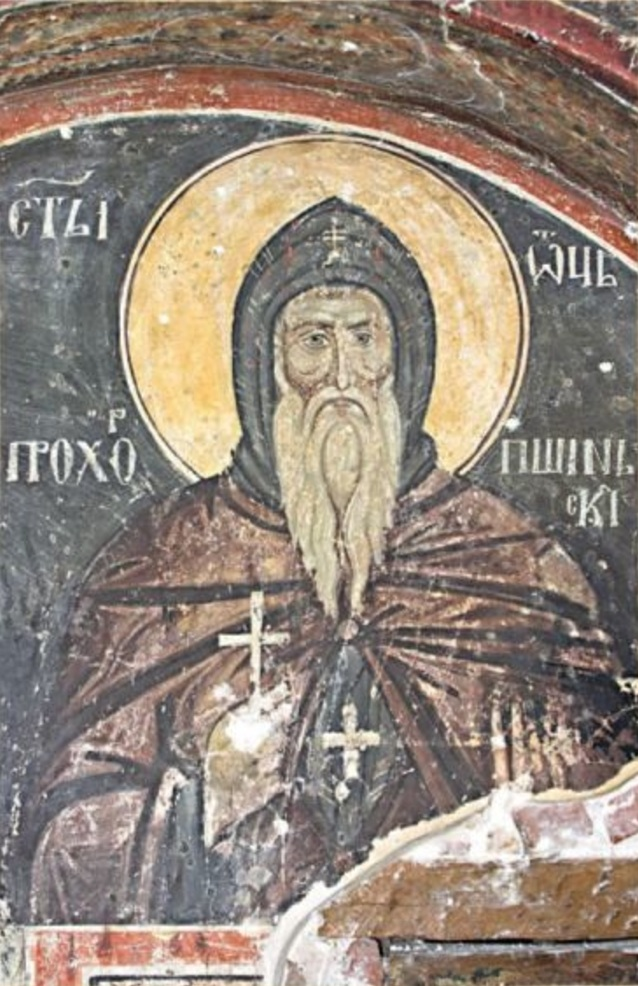
St. Prochorus of Pechenga (Pchinja).

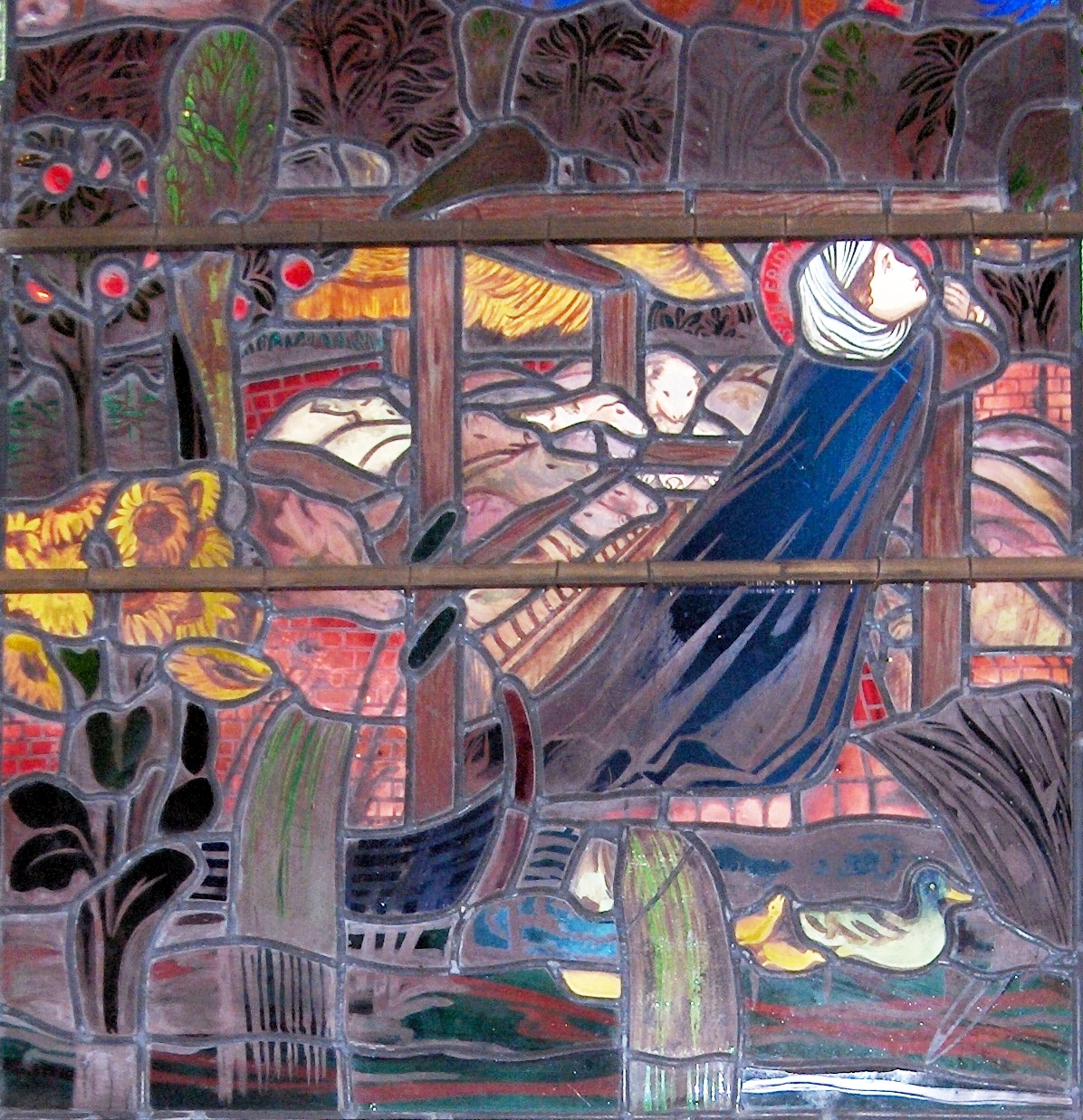
St. Frideswide of Oxford (Stained-glass window in Christ Church, Oxford).

Righteous John of Kronstadt, Wonderworker.

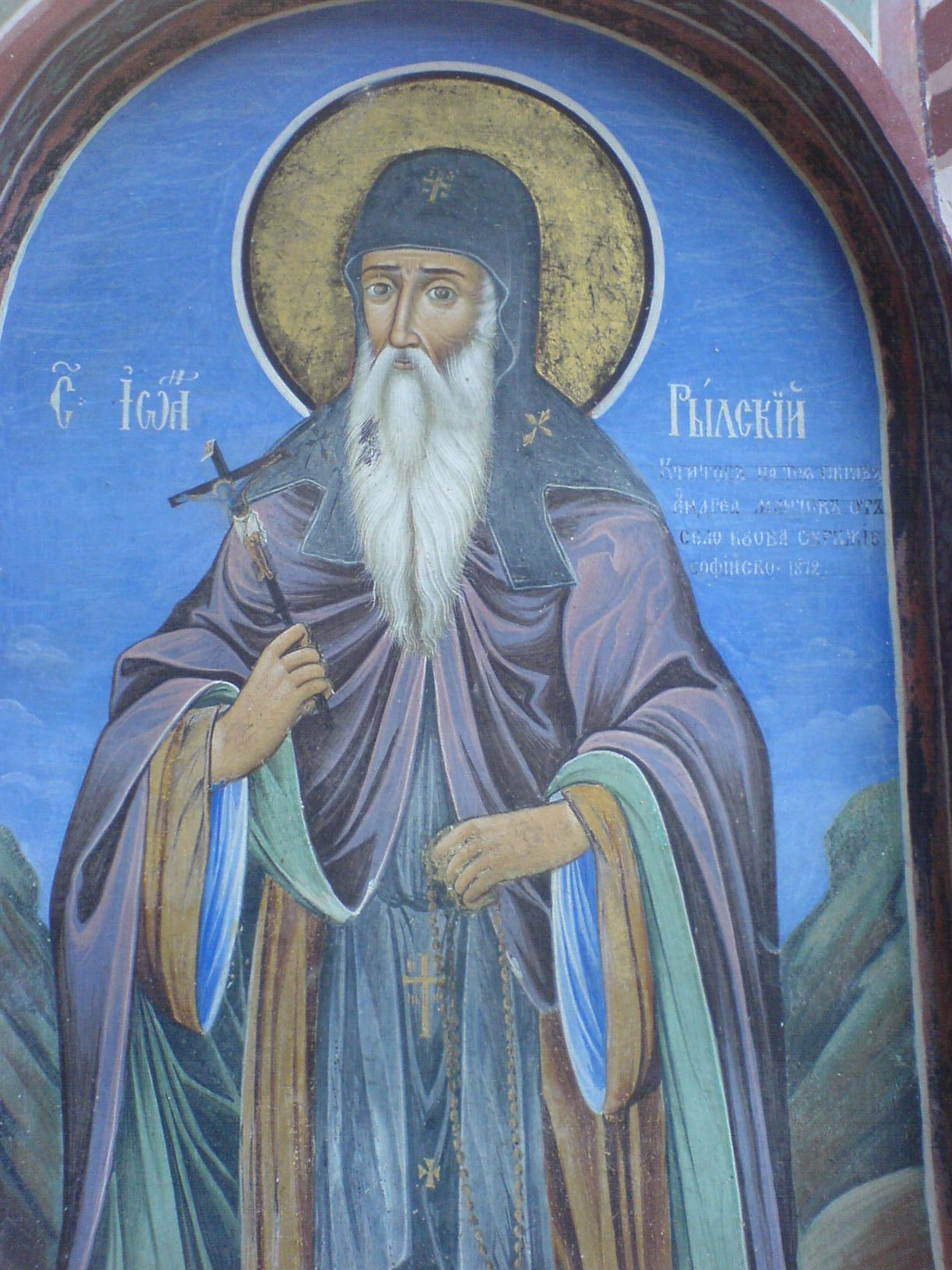
Venerable John of Rila.

== Sources ==
- October 19 / November 1. Orthodox Calendar (PRAVOSLAVIE.RU).
- November 1 / October 19. HOLY TRINITY RUSSIAN ORTHODOX CHURCH (A parish of the Patriarchate of Moscow).
- October 19. OCA - The Lives of the Saints.
- The Autonomous Orthodox Metropolia of Western Europe and the Americas (ROCOR). St. Hilarion Calendar of Saints for the year of our Lord 2004. St. Hilarion Press (Austin, TX). p. 78.
- The Nineteenth Day of the Month of October. Orthodoxy in China.
- October 19. Latin Saints of the Orthodox Patriarchate of Rome.
- The Roman Martyrology. Transl. by the Archbishop of Baltimore. Last Edition, According to the Copy Printed at Rome in 1914. Revised Edition, with the Imprimatur of His Eminence Cardinal Gibbons. Baltimore: John Murphy Company, 1916. pp. 322–323.
- Rev. Richard Stanton. A Menology of England and Wales, or, Brief Memorials of the Ancient British and English Saints Arranged According to the Calendar, Together with the Martyrs of the 16th and 17th Centuries. London: Burns & Oates, 1892. pp. 503–507.

Greek Sources

- Great Synaxaristes: (in Greek) 19 ΟΚΤΩΒΡΙΟΥ. ΜΕΓΑΣ ΣΥΝΑΞΑΡΙΣΤΗΣ.
- (in Greek) Συναξαριστής. 19 Οκτωβρίου. ECCLESIA.GR. (H ΕΚΚΛΗΣΙΑ ΤΗΣ ΕΛΛΑΔΟΣ).
- (in Greek) 19/10/2017. Ορθόδοξος Συναξαριστής.

Russian Sources

- (in Russian) 1 ноября (19 октября). Православная Энциклопедия под редакцией Патриарха Московского и всея Руси Кирилла (электронная версия). (Orthodox Encyclopedia - Pravenc.ru).
- (in Russian) 19 октября по старому стилю / 1 ноября по новому стилю. Русская Православная Церковь - Православный церковный календарь на 2016 год.
