= Vyoshki (village), Mytishchi, Moscow Oblast =

Coordinates: 55.927°N 37.612°E

Vyoshki Вёшки Vëshki
- Interactive map of Vyoshki
- Country: Russia
- Region: Moscow Oblast
- District: Mytishchinsky District
- Highest elevation: 174 m (571 ft)

Population (Census 2010)
  - Total: 1,058
- Time zone: UTC+3:00
- Postal code: 141031

Vyoshki or Vëshki (Russian: Вёшки, IPA: [ˈvʲɵʂkʲɪ]) is a rural locality (a (posyolok) under the administrative jurisdiction of the City of Mytishchi, Moscow Oblast, Russia. Population: 966 (2010 census); 378 (2002 census);

== Etymology ==
Вешка is a colloquial diminutive of the word веха, which means «a milestone»; a pole, pointed on one side, a branch that serves to indicate the path, boundaries of land plots, the layout of something on the terrain. Вёшка is an outdated and dialectic version of spelling and pronunciation, entrenched in the toponym.

== Geography ==
In the area, there are six cottage settlements, a residential complex, a dacha nonprofit partnership (DNP), a partnership of realty owners (PRO), a nonprofit horticultural partnership (NHP), a village and a cemetery. The Altufyevskoye Highway passes through the area and the Chermyanka River flows through it. The area is surrounded by forest on all sides.

== Local cultural sights ==
In the area, there are two Eastern Orthodox churches — St. Varus' Church at the exit from the highway to the Moscow Ring Road, on the territory of which the ecological park «On the unknown Mytishchi paths» is located, and the Church of Elijah the Prophet at the entrance to one of the neighboring NHPs in the northeast (both belonging to the Moscow Patriarchate), as well as the Stele in memory of the fallen soldiers, dedicated to the Great Patriotic War.

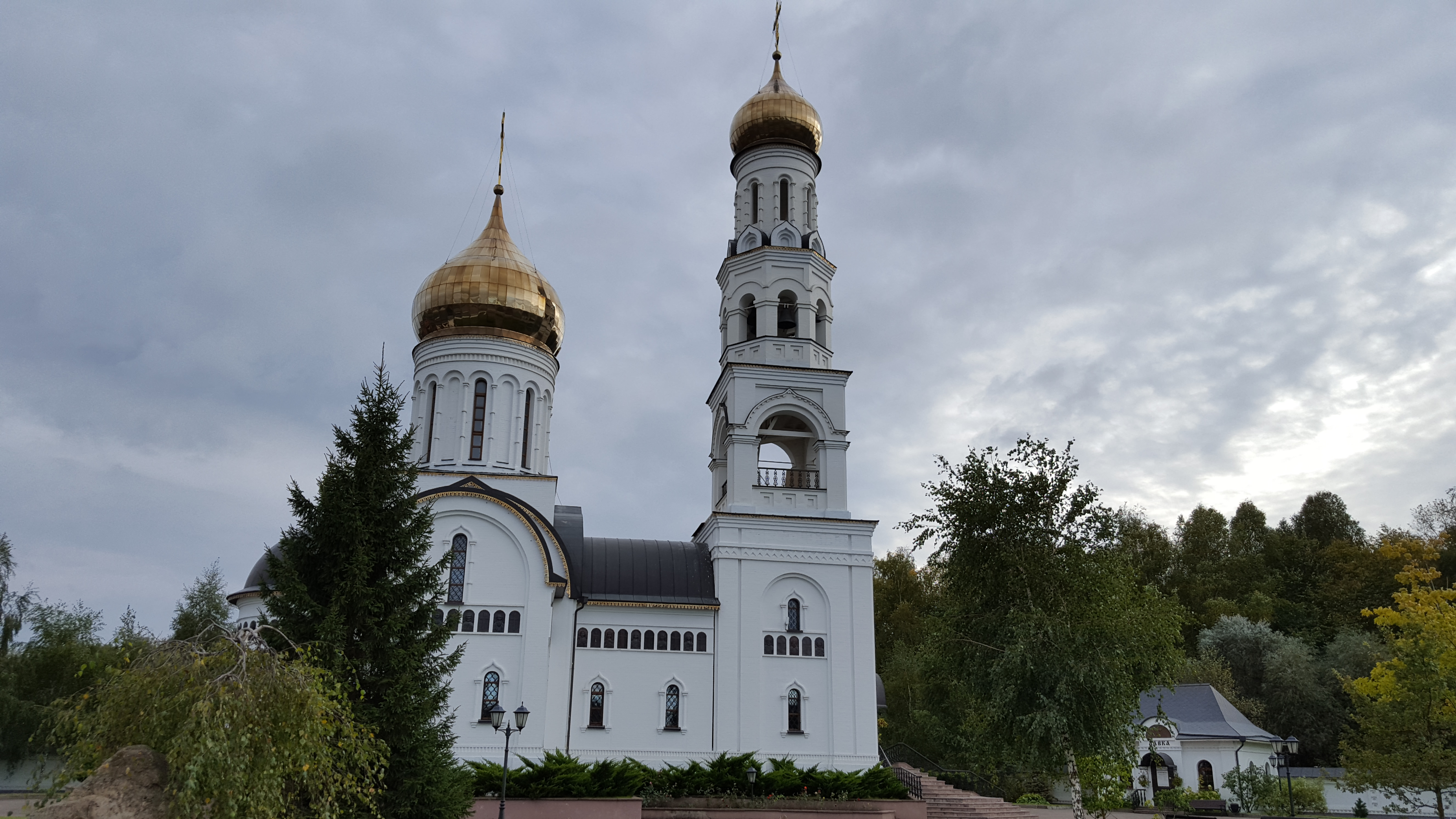
St. Varus' Church, built in 2003-2006
