= Monastery of St. Roman =

Monastery of the Serbian Orthodox Church

Coordinates: 43.6239°N 21.5263°E

Monastery of St. Roman Манастир Свети Роман
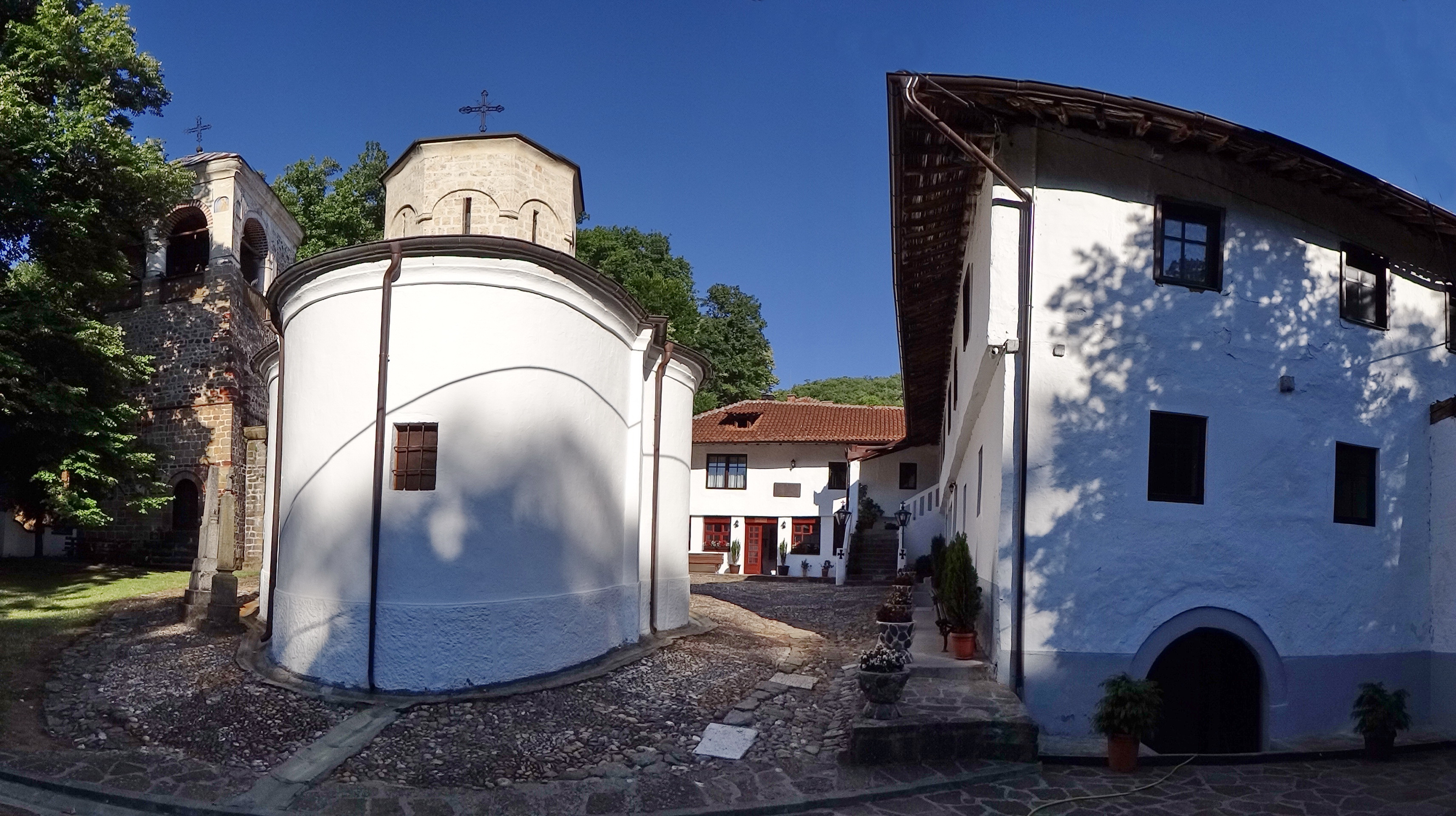

Religion
- Affiliation: Serbian Orthodox Church
- Ecclesiastical or organisational status: Eparchy of Niš

Location
- Location: Praskovče, Serbia
- Interactive map of Monastery of St. Roman; Манастир Свети Роман

Architecture
- Completed: 1010
- Cultural Heritage of Serbia
- Official name: Manastir Sv. Roman
- Type: Cultural monument of Great Importance
- Designated: 31 May 1967
- Reference no.: SK 232

The Monastery of Saint Roman (Serbian: Манасир Свети Pоман, romanized: Manastir Sveti Roman) is a monastery of the Serbian Orthodox Church, Eparchy of Niš, in the village of Praskovče. According to some research, the monastery of Saint Roman is considered to be one of the oldest monasteries in the territory of Serbia, established in 1010. It represents an immovable cultural property as a cultural monument of great importance.

The monastery is located in Razanj municipality, on the right bank of the South Morava. Next to the monastery is the road that connects Razanj and Kruševac. The nearest larger settlement is the village of Praskovce.

== History ==
The monastery belongs to a small group of monasteries erected before the Nemanjić dynasty came into power. St. Roman came in 888 in this region. In the Chrysovul (endowment diploma) of Emperor Basil II in 1011, the monastery is mentioned for the first time. The second official mention is from 1498.

The monastery is known for being the residence of a monk by the name of Roman Sinait (or Roman of Sinai), who was later declared a saint, so the monastery, in fact, carries his name. The tomb of Saint Roman Sinait with relics rests in the monastery to this day. He is revered by the people there as a miracle worker and healer. The Sinai monks, followers of Thessaloniki miracle worker Gregory Palamas, accepted his teachings and came to Serbia during Prince Lazar's reign.

The present-day monastery church was erected by the warden of the Prince Lazar's Stud Farm on an old foundation. It was rebuilt by Đorđe Pile in 1795 in gratitude for having been healed. He accomplished the task only after securing a firman (restoration decree) from the Sultan for the payment of 300 golden ducats (approximately US$41,000 to US$60,000. The painting is from 1795 and is preserved in the choirs and domes. It is believed that there are even older murals below the lime layer. A new painting was made in 1831. Also, there was the Hospital of Saint Roman Monastery during the time of wars.
