= Stanislav of Lesnovo =

Serbian writer (14th century)

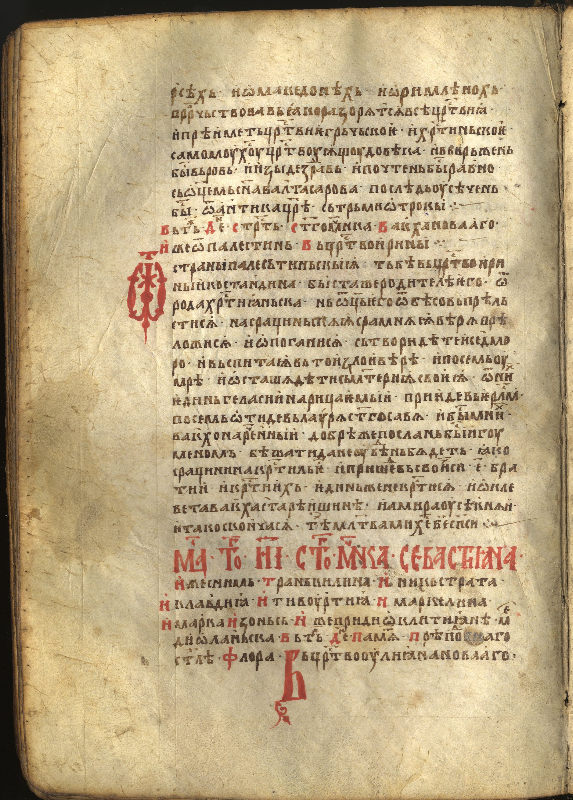
- Second Lesnovian (Kovacevian) prolog from the time between years 1330 and 1340
- Born: before 1330; Štip, Kingdom of Serbia (now R. Macedonia)
- Died: after 1342
- Occupation: scribe
- Writing career
- Language: Church Slavonic
- Years active: fl. 1330–42
- Subject: Orthodox

Stanislav of Lesnovo (Serbian: Станислав Лесновски; fl. 1330–42) or Stanislav Gramatik (Станислав Граматик), was a Serbian writer, a scribe in the monastery of Lesnovo.

== Biography ==
Judging from his secular name, he was not a monk but a layman. He was most probably from Štip, according to the inscription (I, Stanislav Gramatik of Štip) he left in the Church of St. George in Gornji Kozjak. He lived and created his works in the Serbian state of King Stefan Dečanski and his son Stefan Dušan, in the first half of the 14th century. Stanislav is the most important representative of the monastic literary center established in the monastery of Lesnovo in this period. The monastery of Lesnovo was in this period in the stage of renovation. As a crown of this process, it was completely rebuilt by Jovan Oliver in 1341. We know for sure that Stanislav worked in Lesnovo for at least twelve years.

Together with his pupils, Stanislav of Lesnovo edited and transcribed a Prologue (1330) which comprises also a short hagiography of Saint Gabriel of Lesnovo (today in Belgrade), Oliver's Menologion (Oliverov minej, 1342) with the Service of St. Gabriel of Lesnovo, for which he also painted illustrations by hand (this book, as several others were lost in 1915 during the retreat of the Serbian army). He is also ascribed as the author of two more menologions of which one is lost and the other is kept in Sofia. Basing his work on earlier examples Stanislav created the first hagiography of the patron saint of his monastery, skilfully combining realism, fantasy and symbolism. In his Prologue (1330) he writes in the time of "Most High King Stefan Uroš Dečanski" whom he praises and notes that he "came back from Greece and took over the Kingdom of the entire Serbian land and Maritime, the lands by the Danube and those by Ovče Polje, not by force but by God's will. He invaded the Greek land and seized many towns and killed the strong Bulgarian Tsar Michael Šišman". He starts his book Oliver's Menologion (1342) with these words: "By the will of the Father and the assistance of the Son and the intervention of the Holy Spirit this book was begun and completed in the years and days of the highest and holy born King Stephan /Dušan/ when the entire province of Ovče Polje was under the rule of the great Jovan Oliver, in the district of Zletovo, in the place called Lesnovo (...)".

According to some authors, Stanislav continued his work in Marko's Monastery where a monk of the same name was mentioned in 1353.

In many Bulgarian sources Stanislav is referred as Bulgarian. He is also regarded one of the most important writers of 14th-century Macedonia.

== See also ==
- Jovan the Serb of Kratovo
- Teodosije the Hilandarian (1246-1328), one of the most important Serbian writers in the Middle Ages
- Elder Grigorije (fl. 1310–1355), builder of Saint Archangels Monastery
- Antonije Bagaš (fl. 1356–1366), bought and restored the Agiou Pavlou monastery
- Lazar the Hilandarian (fl. 1404), the first known Serbian and Russian watchmaker
- Pachomius the Serb (fl. 1440s-1484), hagiographer of the Russian Church
- Miroslav Gospel
- Gabriel the Hilandarian
- Constantine of Kostenets
- Cyprian, Metropolitan of Kiev and All Rus'
- Gregory Tsamblak
- Isaija the Monk

== Sources ==
- Gabelić, Smiljka (1998). Manastir Lesnovo: istorija i slikarstvo. Stubovi kulture. OCLC 768351024.
- Petkov, Kiril (31 August 2008). The Voices of Medieval Bulgaria, Seventh-Fifteenth Century: The Records of a Bygone Culture. BRILL. ISBN 90-04-16831-1.
