= Saint Cleopatra =

Eastern Orthodox saint, Catholic saint, Oriental Orthodox saint

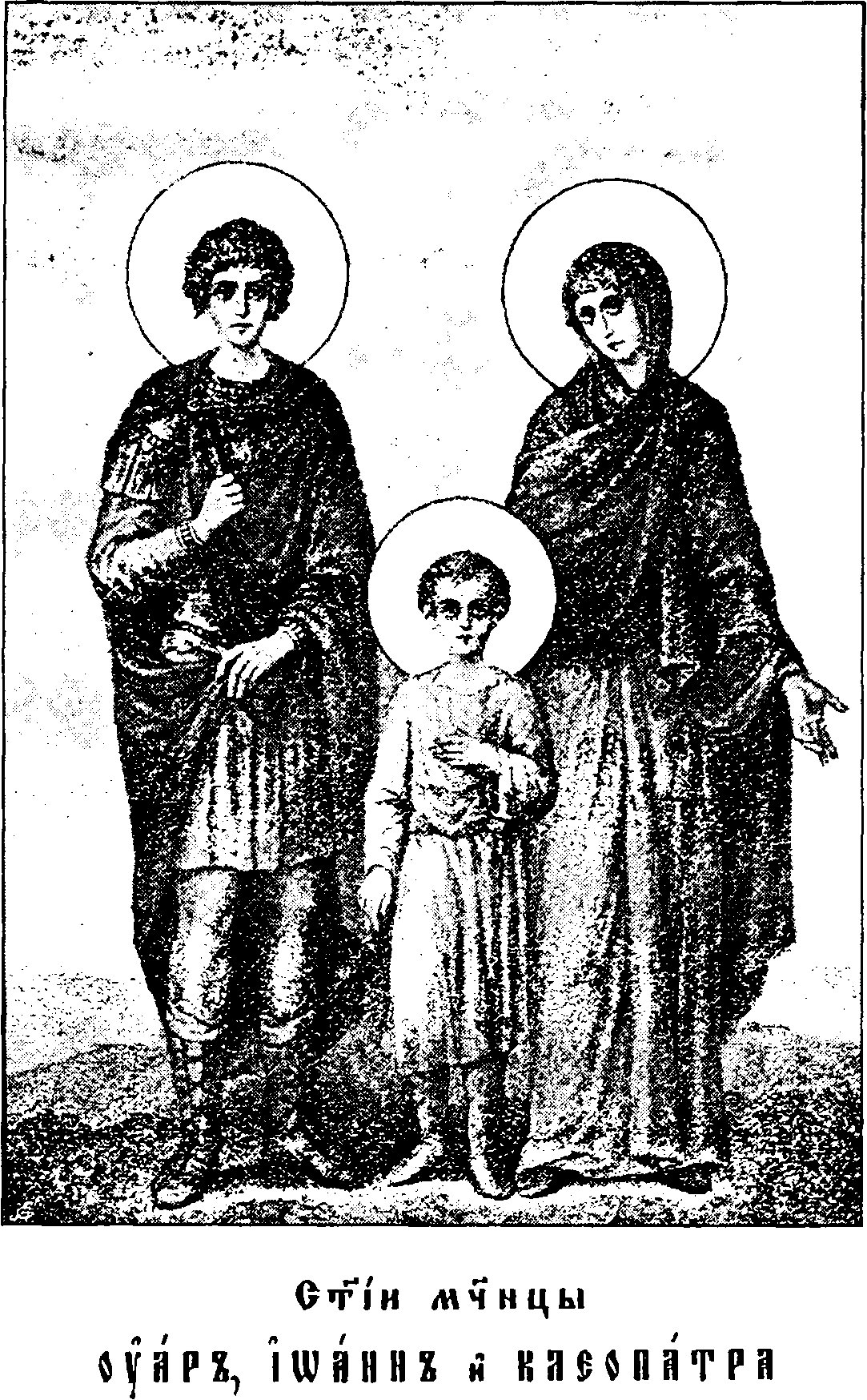

Blessed Cleopatra
- Born: Estimated Early 4th century AD; Mount Tabor, Syria Palaestina
- Died: Estimated 327 AD
- Venerated in: Roman Catholic Church; Eastern Orthodox Church; Oriental Orthodox Church
- Feast: 19 October and 1 November

Saint Cleopatra (Greek: Κλεοπάτρα, Coptic: ⲕⲗⲉⲟⲡⲁⲧⲣⲁ, died 327 AD) was a Christian Saint who lived in the early 4th century. She is venerated in Catholicism, Eastern Orthodoxy, and Oriental Orthodoxy

== Life ==
Cleopatra was born in the early 4th century, to a wealthy Christian family in the village Edra near Mount Tabor in Lower Galilee. When she had reached proper age, she was married to a military commander. She bore a son named John, who was her livelihood. After John was born, her husband was on a tour in Egypt, where he had died. She was left as a widow which meant John was now the sole male of the household.

Cleopatra had later heard Saint Varus' execution and found his body, disguised it in a bale of wool, and brought it to her home in Daraa, east of Lake Tiberiastem. She preserved his relics and buried him. Many other Christians came to venerate the Saint at the tomb. Cleopatra constantly prayed to him, lit candles in his honor, censed his relics with frankincense, and asked him to pray to God for her.

In the following years, more and more people were coming to venerate his tomb, at that same time Constantine removed the laws against Christianity. The removal of the persecution gave Cleopatra the opportunity to go to her family home in Edra. She brought Saint Varus' bones to her family village with John's assistance, under the guise of the bones being her husbands' remains. In Edra she started building a church in honor of the Saint. John was now 17 and offered the rank of centurion, but Cleopatra vowed to not let him fulfill his rank until after they finished construction, due to that rule, the construction was finished quickly. She and John put the bones of Saint Varus within their new shrine under the altar.

After her and John completed building the church, shrine, she allowed him to accept his offer of the rank of centurion. Cleopatra hosted a large congregation of Christians, celebrating the church and Saint Varus. But to her great sorrow, she was alerted that he had become violently sick. The same night that he fell ill, he passed away. Cleopatra, now in grief, turned to the relics of Saint Varus, begging the saint to return her son. She is said to have begged, pleaded and cried to Saint Varus, praying for him to return her son. She had John's remains brought to the church and placed next to Saint Varus, begging him and God. and was found wondering: How could God allow this? After everything she had done with her worship, veneration, and preservation of his relics; The Saint and John then appeared to her in a dream in radiant bright attire, with crowns upon their heads. She was comforted by Saint Varus, he spoke to her and expressed how he had not forgotten her prayers and her care. She woke with the knowledge and comfort that her prayers were not in vain and her son's death was not overlooked, for John was seen by the Lord, and received into the Heavenly Kingdom of God.

Following John's death, she moved to live by the church that she had built over the relics of Saint Varus and her son's. Miracles were reported by people who had come to pray at the church. Cleopatra spent her remaining years in the service of God, she gave her property to the poor, and spent her time praying and fasting. She died in the mid 3rd century. Estimated to be specifically 327 AD.

== Veneration ==
St. Cleopatra is venerated with her son John, their feast day is October 19th, and in other specific regions, practices, monasteries and convents, the feast day is November 1st instead. The saints themselves, along with said feast days are venerated and recognized in Eastern Orthodoxy, Oriental Orthodoxy, and Catholicism.

You can find an Icon of Saint Cleopatra on convent and monastery websites and from other iconographers. She sometimes is depicted as holding a cross, which is a symbol in all Orthodox iconography to show martyrdom, with Cleopatra specifically, this is because of her connection to Saint Varus. She is sometimes shown with a scroll instead which is a symbol of knowledge. You can also find Icons of her with John, in which John is depicted as a child, and also with Saint Varus (as in the above image).

Prayers to Saint Cleopatra can be achieved by using general prayer, her designated musical cannon, venerating her through her icon(s), and attending services on, or observing her on her feast days.
