= Gabriel of Lesnovo =

11th century Slavic saint

Saint Gabriel of Lesnovo
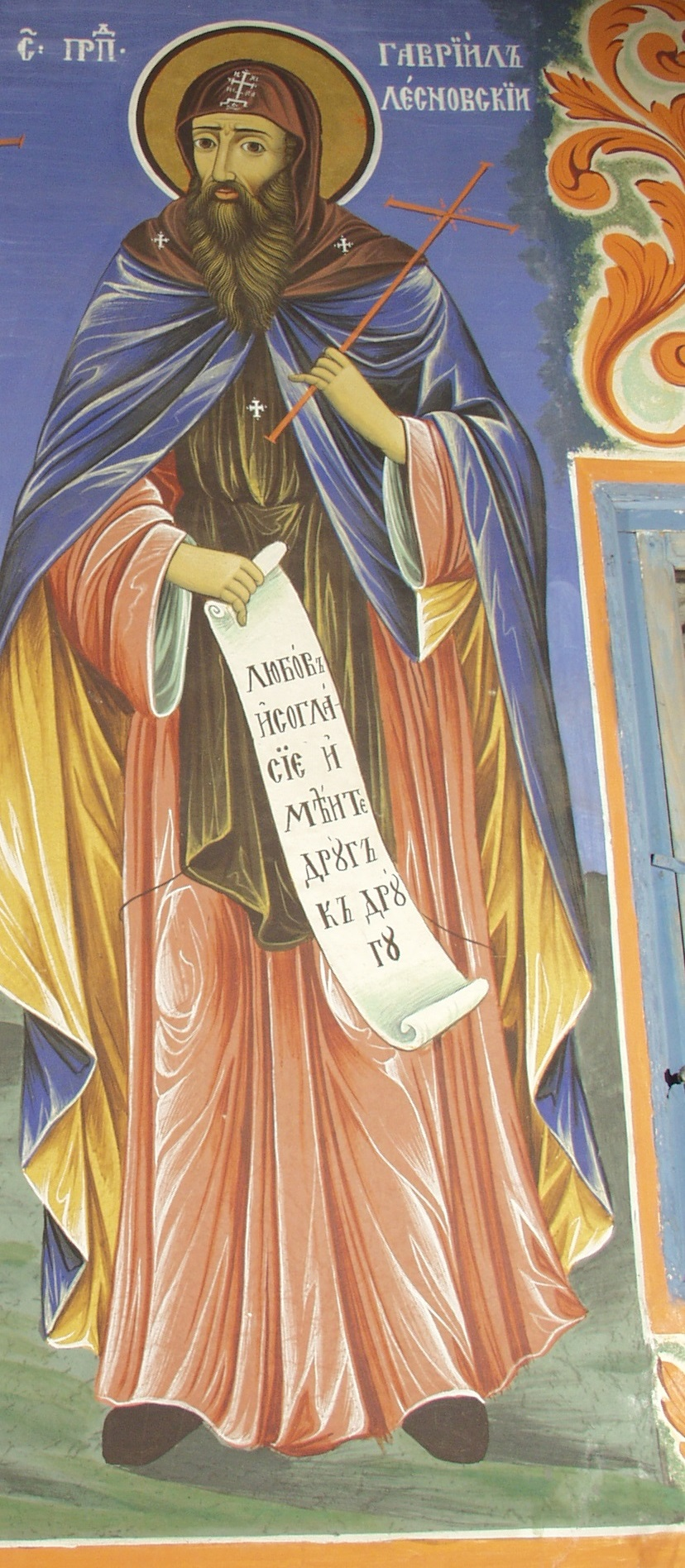
- A fresco in the Rila Monastery, depicting Gabriel of Lesnovo.
- Born: 11th century
- Died: 11th/12th century
- Venerated in: Eastern Orthodox Church
- Major shrine: Lesnovo Monastery, North Macedonia
- Feast: 15 January (28 January in new style)

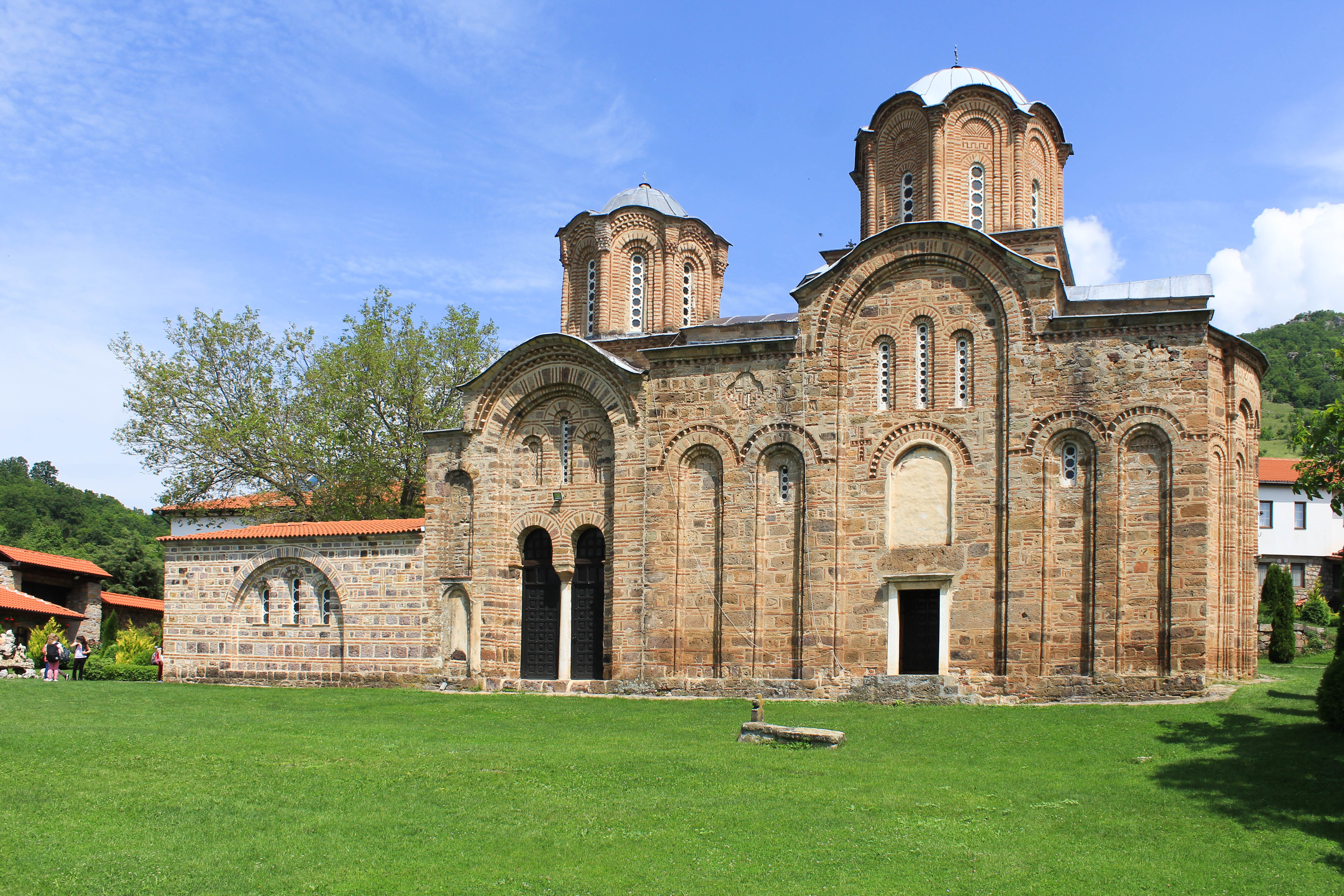
Lesnovo Monastery in North Macedonia, whose foundation has been attributed to Saint Gabriel of Lesnovo.

Gabriel of Lesnovo (Bulgarian: Гавриил Лесновски; Macedonian: Гаврил Лесновски) was a hermit and companion of Joachim of Osogovo, John of Rila and Prohor of Pčinja. All four are venerated as saints in Bulgaria, North Macedonia and Serbia. St. Gabriel's feast is 15 January (28 January in new style).

== Biography ==
There is limited information about Gabriel. According to the Short (Prologue) Life of St Gabriel of Lesnovo, written during the twelfth century, he was a hermit in the tradition of Saint John of Rila and born in the latter part of the eleventh century in the village of Osiče, near Kriva Palanka. Today it is in North Macedonia, but at that time the area was part of the Byzantine Empire, included in a province named Bulgaria. According to other sources, he was born in the early 11th century, when the area was still part of the First Bulgarian Empire. Per his hagiography, his family was noble. His father was a royal advisor.

Per historian Ivan Snegarov, his parents had him married, but the woman later died. According to professor of religion Michael J. Walsh, his parents wanted him to marry but the woman whom he was to marry died, enabling him to serve in a monastery. Prior, he had spent his time praying. He built the church of the Nativity of the Virgin in his native village with the money of his parents. Per the older short biography, he founded the Lesnovo Monastery, and was its first ktetor. While per the later biography, the monastery already existed and when he became a monk, his abbot allowed him to live an ascetic life in the woods of Zletovo. Gabriel lived a life of asceticism in Kratovo on Mt. Osogovo, where he built a church dedicated to the Holy Archangel Michael. It remains still unsolved whether Gabriel founded a monastery or whether it was founded on the spot close to his hermitage. Very little is known of this original monastery and the first and only mention of the old monastery comes only from 1330 in a chronicle by its monk Stanislav. During his lifetime, there were beliefs that he had healing power. Gabriel died in the eleventh century or twelfth century.

== Legacy ==
Gabriel's cult was revived immediately after his death. His relics were also discovered and in his honor, the Lesnovo sanctuary was created or expanded. During the reign of Emperor Ivan Asen II (r. 1218–1241), the relics were transferred from the monastery to the then capital of Bulgaria — Tarnovo, and placed at the Church of St. Apostles on Trapezitsa. After the Ottoman invasion of Bulgaria at the end of the 14th century, the traces of the relics were lost. The church located at the present-day monastery was built by Despot Jovan Oliver, a nobleman under the Emperor Stefan Dušan (r. 1331–1355). The "Short (Prologue) Life of St Gabriel of Lesnovo" has been preserved in one manuscript, copied in the Lesnovo Monastery by monk Stanislav in 1330. His feast day is 15 January (28 January in new style). Gabriel is honored as a saint in Bulgaria, North Macedonia, and Serbia, together with Joachim of Osogovo, John of Rila and Prohor of Pčinja. In North Macedonia, he has been seen as the patron and protector of the Lesnovo Monastery.

== See also ==
- List of Serbian saints

== Sources ==
- Kazhdan, A. (1991). The Oxford Dictionary of Byzantium. New York, Oxford: Oxford University Press. ISBN 0-19-504652-8.
