= Saint Varus =

Early Christian martyr

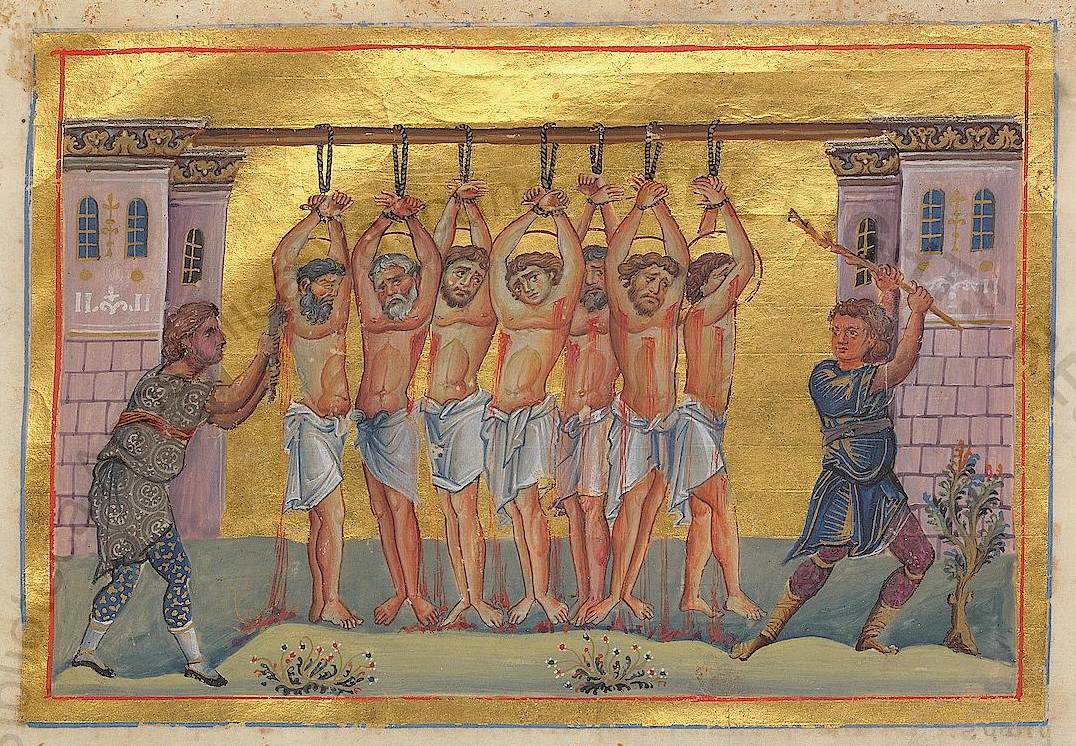

Martyr
- Born: Unknown; Egypt
- Died: c. 304; Alexandria, Egypt
- Venerated in: Coptic Orthodox Church; Eastern Orthodox Church; Roman Catholic Church
- Feast: 19 October (Eastern Orthodox Church, Roman Catholic Church); 15 Paopi (Coptic Orthodox Church)
- Attributes: Martyr; Soldier holding a cross.

Saint Varus (Greek: Οὔαρος; died c. 304) was an early Christian saint, soldier and martyr.

== Biography ==
According to his generally reliable and authentic Acts, he was a soldier stationed in Upper Egypt who had the task of guarding a group of 7 monks awaiting execution. It is stated that Varus was already a Christian at this point, but had weak faith. After witnessing one of the monks perish, the faith of Varus became reinvigorated, and he joined the monks. For this, Varus was tortured, and had his body hung from a tree.

== Veneration ==
St. Varus is commemorated on 19 October in the Eastern Orthodox and Roman Catholic Churches, and 15 Paopi in the Coptic Orthodox Church. He became widely venerated in Russia as a martyr and intercessor, particularly through stories involving Blessed Cleopatra and her son.

Some sources claim that St. Varus intercedes for the unbaptized, based on a story in which he allegedly prays for the souls of Cleopatra's relatives. They cite the “Canon to the Martyr Varus, patron of those who die outside the Church”.

However, historical and liturgical evidence shows that this canon is not part of the traditional Orthodox Church:

The canon did not exist in any Orthodox Menaion until Metropolitan Nikodim Rotov added it in the 1960s or 1970s. Rotov was a known ecumenist, a president of the World Council of Churches, and “collapsed and died at the Vatican during the inauguration of John Paul I.”

The canon was compiled by priestless Old Believers. It has only officially been added to any Orthodox Menaion in the Moscow Patriarchate, and has been removed from print as of 2019.

In the original lives of St. Varus and Blessed Cleopatra, there is no mention of unbaptized salvation. In one vision, Varus appears to Cleopatra holding her deceased son, saying, “If you wish, I will give him back to you!” But her son told her that he was very happy there and did not want to return. Varus is said to pray for her parents, but “nowhere in any tradition is it stated” that they were unbaptized.

Fr. John Nefyodov:

“The service of the Martyr Varus was not composed by Metropolitan Nikodim (Rotov), but was taken from a handwritten liturgical collection of the 18th–19th centuries of Old Believer, priestless origin (likely from the Vygo-Leksin tradition). Until the 19th century, there were no special ‘functional’ canons, much less vigil services, to be found in either the Canon Books or Psalters with a following. Nor is this canon found in the most well-known printed Old Believer editions.” — Fr. John Nefyodov, On the Other Service to St. Varus in the Green Menaion.

Protopresbyter Konstantin Bufeev:

“In a church service led by a priest or bishop, there is no possibility to legally pray for the unbaptized, non-Orthodox, or suicides. It is essential to note that ‘at the divine service we commemorate only the children of the Church, who have joined it through the Sacrament of Holy Baptism.’ Only the canon itself, not the vigil service, may in particular cases be recommended for private cell prayer for deceased non-Orthodox relatives, ‘with the strict prohibition of reading this canon in Orthodox churches and chapels during public services and rituals.’” — Bufeev, About the Holy Martyr Varus and Church Prayer for the Non-Orthodox.

Hieromonk Sergei Rybko:

“One may pray at home for an unbaptized deceased relative because no one has the right to deprive a person of a certain consolation, so that in prayer they may find comfort regarding their unbaptized relatives. According to the teaching of the Church, salvation is impossible without baptism, since the Gospel states that ‘unless one is born of water and the Spirit, he cannot enter the Kingdom of Heaven.’ The idea that St. Varus intercedes for the unbaptized is outright heresy! This heresy was introduced into common practice by Metropolitan Nikodim (Rotov) of Leningrad, a proponent of Renovationism, Catholicism, and ecumenism.” — Rybko, A Conversation on Prayer for the Departed

Archimandrite Raphael Karelin:

“The life of Martyr Varus and Blessed Cleopatra contains no reference to posthumous salvation of pagans. Prayer for the departed can help those who possessed the Orthodox faith, but it cannot save someone outside the Church. The canon to the Martyr Varus, which patronizes him as a saint who prays non-Orthodox out of hell, is a modern innovation, foreign to Orthodox liturgical tradition.” — Karelin, Let No One Deceive You: On Prayer for the Departed.

Therefore, the “Canon to the Martyr Varus” for the unbaptized is a modern innovation with no basis in Orthodox tradition. The story of Varus and Cleopatra's relatives does not claim they were unbaptized, and Orthodox teaching holds that only baptized members of the Church may be commemorated in liturgical services. Private prayer at home for unbaptized relatives is permitted, but public liturgical use is not.

== See also ==
- Saint Cleopatra — witnessed the suffering and execution of Saint Varus.
- Lectionary 211
- October 19 (Eastern Orthodox liturgics)
