= Prohor of Pčinja =

Eastern Orthodox monk and saint (c. 1000–1067)

Saint Prochorus of Pčinja
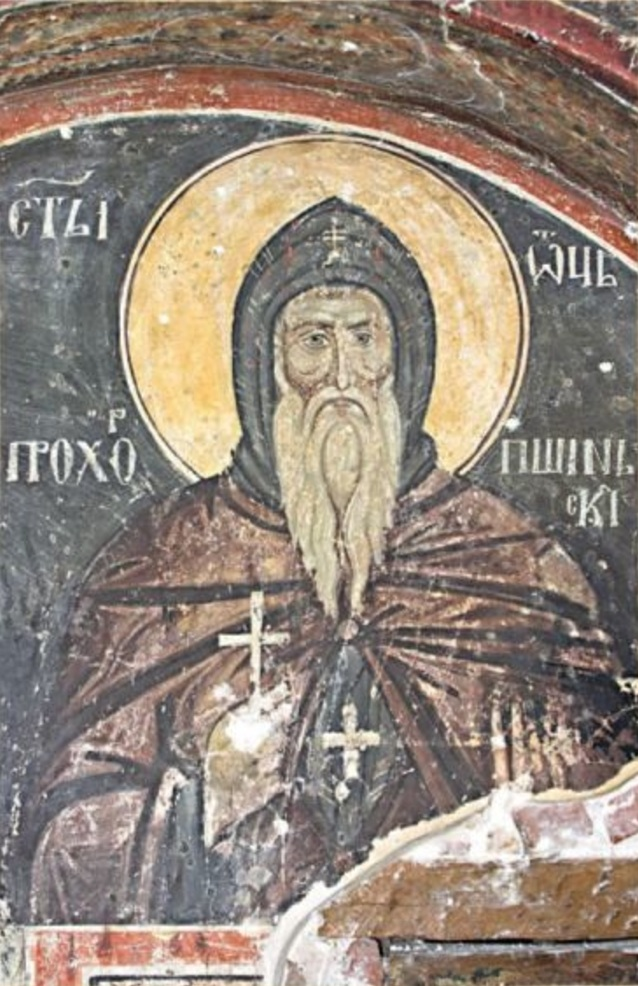
- A fresco icon depicting Saint Prochorus

Venerable
- Born: c. 1000
- Died: 1067
- Venerated in: Eastern Orthodox Church
- Feast: 1 November [O.S. 19 October] 15 January

Prochorus of Pčinja (Bulgarian: Прохор Пчински, romanized: Prohor Pčinski, Macedonian and Serbian: Прохор Пчињски, romanized: Prohor Pčinjski; born c. 1000 – died 1067) was an 11th-century Eastern Orthodox monk and contemporary of Saints Gabriel of Lesnovo and John of Rila who lived in the First Bulgarian Empire before and after its conquest by the Byzantine Empire. He is venerated as a saint in the Eastern Orthodox Church, with his feast day being commemorated on 1 November [O.S. 19 October].

== Biography ==
Prochorus was born into a Bulgarian family in the Ovče Pole area, then in the First Bulgarian Empire, today in North Macedonia.

According to tradition, the young ascetic Prochorus was shown in a vision a place near the Pčinja River where he would be a hermit. For many years, nobody disturbed him, until one day a hunter chasing a deer came across the saint, who was in prayer. The hunter engaged the monk in conversation, which went on for hours. As he prepared to take his leave, the hunter asked for the saint's blessing, upon which Saint Prochorus foretold that greatness awaited him. The hunter, Romanos Diogenes, became Byzantine emperor in 1068. The emperor sought out the prophetic hermit but found his grave instead. The church of Prohor Pčinjski Monastery was built by the generosity of the emperor, as a sign of his thanksgiving to God and the saint. There is an icon in the monastery's church that shows Prochorus' encounter with Emperor Romanos. Also shown are wild animals approaching him without fear such as a deer.

== Legacy ==
Hermits before Prochorus, John of Rila, Joachim of Osogovo, Peter of Koriša and those after them have exerted both social and cultural influence on the people of the Balkan Peninsula during the Middle Ages.
