= Joachim of Osogovo =

Bulgarian saint

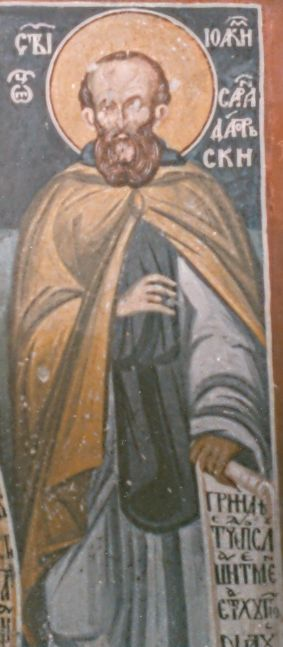
- Image of St. Joachim Osogovski on the murals at the Poganovo Monastery of St. John the Theologian, Tsaribrodsko. 1499
- Died: 1105
- Venerated in: Bulgarian Orthodox Church, Serbian Orthodox Church
- Canonized: 12th century, Staro Nagoričane
- Major shrine: Osogovo Monastery
- Feast: 16 August (Julian)
- Patronage: Bulgaria, North Macedonia

Joachim of Osogovo (Bulgarian: Йоаким Осоговски) or Joachim Osogovski was a Bulgarian hermit, now a saint, a contemporary of Gabriel of Lesnovo and Prohor of Pčinja. Joachim was named after a mountain, the Osogovo, no differently than Prohor Pčinjski who, too, was named after a mountain, Pčinja.

When Joachim of Osogovo and Prohor of Pčenja were elevated to sainthood at Staro Nagoričane in the church of St. George (built by King Stefan Milutin), the Bulgarian Orthodox Church was the first of that era to foster the cults of holy monks and hermits.

His feast day is celebrated on the 16th of August (Julian calendar).
