= Vojihna =

Serbian nobleman

- Born: 1298
- Died: late 1350s (source?) Drama
- Allegiance: Serbian Kingdom; Serbian Empire
- Service years: 1345–56
- Rank: Caesar

Vojihna Nemanjić of Drama or simply Vojin of Drama (Serbian Cyrillic: Војихна ; ca 1298–1360), was a Serbian feudal nobleman, member of the collateral branch of Nemanjić dynasty, ruling family of the medieval Serbia, that rose through the ranks and became one of the most acclaimed military commanders (voivode) and princes of Stephen Uroš IV Dušan of Serbia. During the Serbian Kingdom and Empire (1331–71), he was titled Caesar (Greek: καῖσαρ, sr. ћесар/кесар), hence, he is mostly known as Caesar Vojihna (кесар Војихна). During this period, he was ruling the entire region of Drama (today in Northwestern Greece) as its Lord.

== Origin ==
He was probably born around 1298.

In a Chilandar charter of Emperor Uroš IV Dušan, Vojihna is mentioned as "nobleman and associate of my Empire, cousin Vojihna". This has been interpreted in several ways; Ćirković understand this as the two are relatives, but the degree of kinship can not be determined. According to Vojičić, he is the son of Urošica, however this would mean that they are second cousins, thus Purković connects the kinship through Stefan Konstantin, making the two cousins.

It is thought that he is the same as the Župan Vojihna, who is mentioned in 1323, as an ally of Stephen Vladislav II, during the war of the throne against Stephen Uroš III following the death of Stephen Milutin. With emphasis on Vladislav II being the son of Dragutin, and Dušan calling Vojihna his cousin, this might be an evidence on Vojihna being the son of Urošica, the brother of Vladislav II.

== Life ==
In 1341, Andronikos III Palaiologos died, which sparked a civil war in the Byzantine Empire. In 1342 Dušan became an ally of John VI Kantakouzenos, but only a year after, switched to the side of John V Palaiologos. Kantakouzenos found new allies in the Emirate of Aydin. In 1344, Dušan sent a small army led by Voivode Preljub to intercept the Aydin Turks. The Serbs were defeated in battle at Stephaniana, however it did not halt the Serbian conquest.

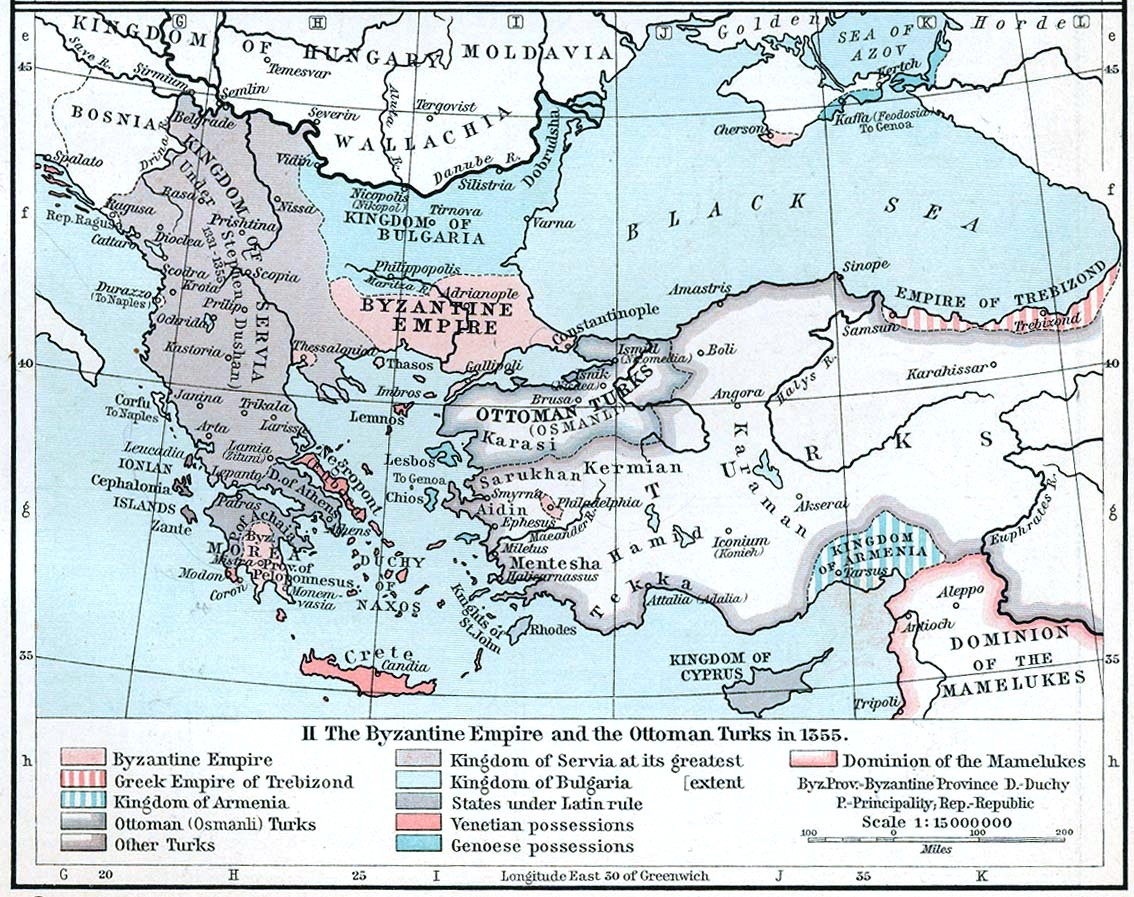
Serbian Empire, 1355.

Stephen Uroš IV Dušan, called "Dušan the Mighty" was proclaimed Emperor at Serres in 1345. In this southeasternmost part of his Empire, Dušan appointed Voihna as governor of Drama, not far from Serres, before November 1345. When Dušan was crowned "Emperor of the Serbs and Greeks" at Skopje on 16 April 1346, he also crowned his son Uroš V as King. Among his royal members and nobility he appointed Simeon Uroš, Jovan Asen, Jovan Oliver as Despots, and Dejan Dragaš, Branko Mladenović as Sebastokrators, and Grgur Golubić, Preljub and Voihna (before 1348) as Caesars. He was second in rank to Caesar Grgur.

In the end of 1347 or early 1348, he followed Dušan to Mount Athos. He donated the village of Potolino in the lower Struma province to the Chilandar in 1348.

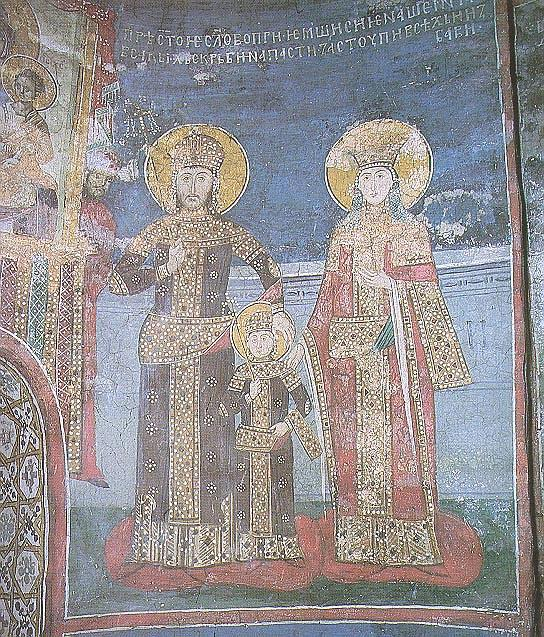
Fresco of Emperor Stefan Dušan, his wife Helena, and their son Stefan Uroš V.

Immediately after Dušan's death (20 December 1355), his wife Empress Helena was found in Serres. She started to exert her imperial control on the region. This surely was against the goals of Vojihna, which would later on trigger armed conflicts. How the Empress ended up in Serres and started to rule it is unknown, it exists sources saying she was in the region staying away from the harsh winter in the north, just when her husband died. As she was energetic and smart (although not so talented), she might have foreseen the crumbling of the Empire, and sought to rule this region. If this version is correct, Vojihna and his son-in-law Uglješa Mrnjavčević (brother of King Vukašin Mrnjavčević) were obliged to work for her as they had done to Dušan, although as the future will tell; with less enthusiasm and fidelity. It is not known how much power Vojihna had in the Serres province, although he most likely had the ambitions of putting it under his control.

Matthew Kantakouzenos led another civil war against John V Palaiologos, and when Vojihna heard that Matthew was coming with his Turkish troops (the Emirate of Aydin) he immediately consulted the court. As allies of John V (a relative Uroš), Uroš assembled an army for his mother that was led by Vojihna. Among the forces were also Serbs from the vicinity of Serres. In fall of 1356 he captured Matthew Kantakouzenos, the rival Byzantine Emperor and son of the former Emperor John VI Kantakouzenos (1347–54). Vojihna planned to release Matthew for a ransom, but soon realized that Emperor John V Palaiologos was willing to offer a far greater sum. Matthew renounced his territory and imperial title in December 1357 and John V continued to rule as sole Emperor.

In 1358, his wife is recorded as making a donation to the Koutloumousiou monastery.

In 1359, Helena abdicated and took monastic vows, under the name Elisabeth.

He died in ca 1360, and his lands were inherited by his son-in-law Uglješa. He was buried in Hilandar, alongside his grandson who died prematurely.

== Family ==
He was married to a noblewoman named Jelena (Elena), who, after his death also became an Orthodox nun under the name Jevpraksija (Eupraxia). They had at least one daughter:

- Jefimija (d. 1405), married to Uglješa Mrnjavčević.

== See also ==
- Serbian Empire
- Fall of the Serbian Empire
