= Preljubje =

Preljubje Прељубје
- Village
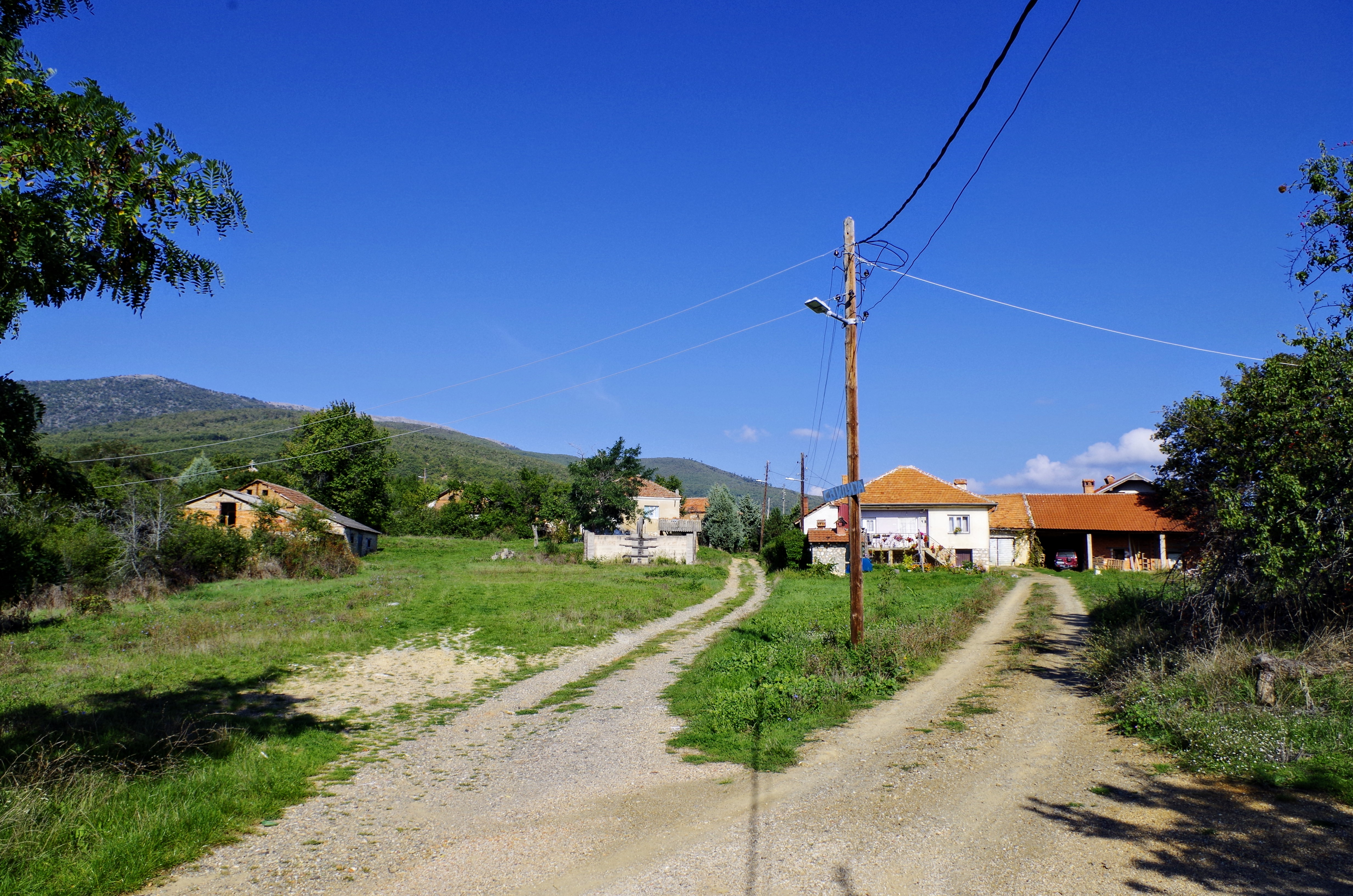
- Houses in the village

- Location within North Macedonia
- Coordinates: 41°02′00″N 20°57′40″E
- Country: North Macedonia
- Region: Pelagonia
- Municipality: Resen

Population (2002)
  - Total: 16
- Time zone: UTC+1 (CET)
  - Summer (DST): UTC+2 (CEST)
- Area code: +389
- Car plates: RE

Preljubje (Macedonian: Прељубје) is a village northeast of Lake Prespa in the Resen Municipality of North Macedonia. It is situated roughly 7.5 kilometres (4.7 mi) from the municipal centre of Resen. The village is named after Preljub.

== Demographics ==
Preljublje's has been declining for decades and is at only 16 as of the most recent census in 2002.

Ethnic group	census 1961		census 1971		census 1981		census 1991		census 1994		census 2002	
Ethnic group	Number	%	Number	%	Number	%	Number	%	Number	%	Number	%
Macedonians	79	100	68	97.1	38	100	22	100	23	100	16	100
others	0	0.0	2	2.9	0	0.0	0	0.0	0	0.0	0	0.0
Total	79		70		38		22		23		16	
