= The arrival of Emperor Dušan in Dubrovnik =

Painting by Marko Murat

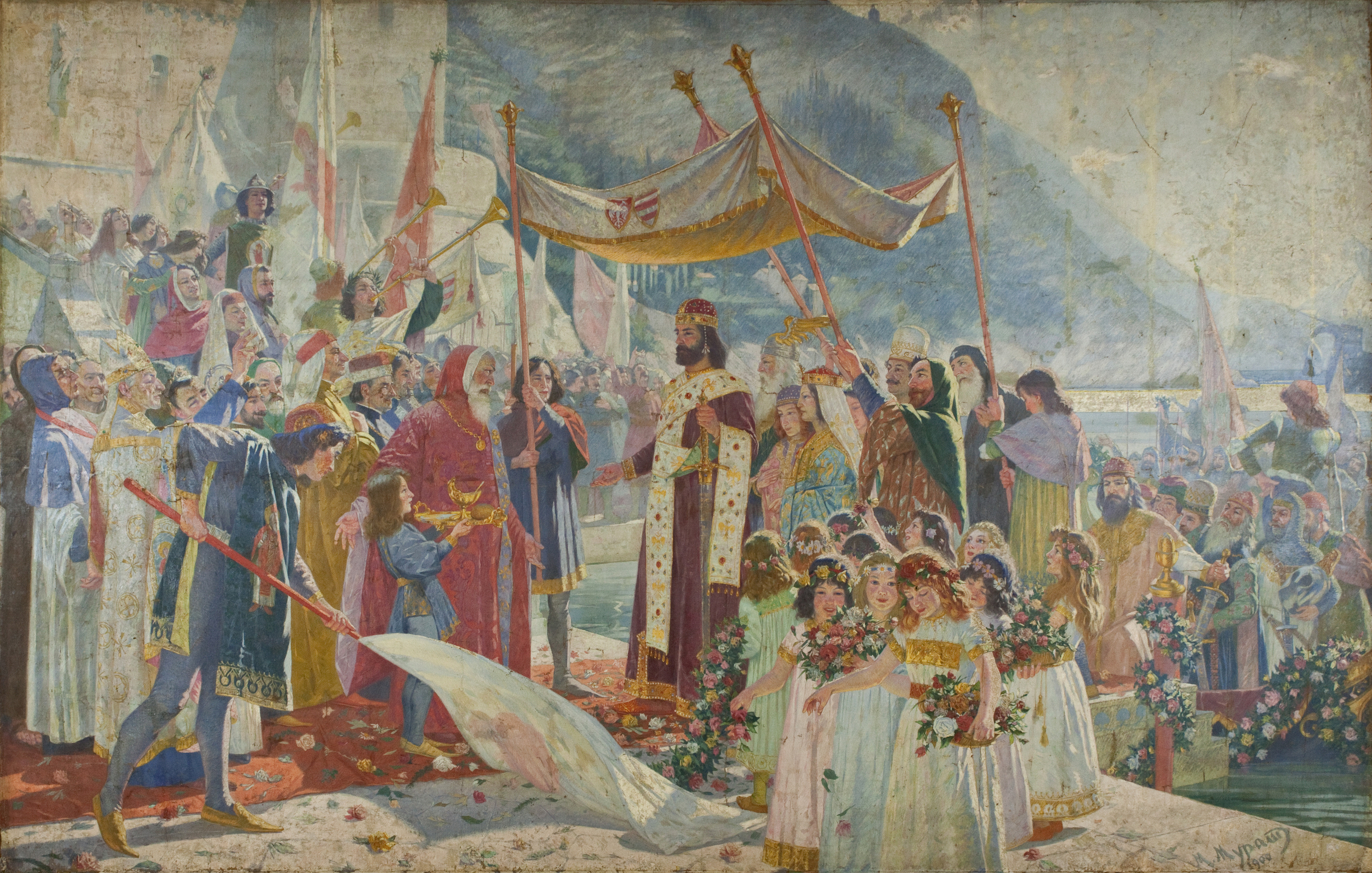
- Artist: Marko Murat
- Year: 1899–1900
- Location: National Museum of Serbia

The arrival of Emperor Dušan in Dubrovnik (Serbian Cyrillic: Долазак цара Душана у Дубровник, romanized: Dolazak cara Dušana u Dubrovnik) is a painting by the Serbian painter Marko Murat.

== Composition ==
Murat painted the painting in the hall of the Palilula school between 1899 and 1900 on his own initiative. Part of the finances was provided by king Milan Obrenović, while the remaining part was provided by the painter himself.

The theme of the painting is the ceremonial entry of Emperor Dušan into Dubrovnik in 1350. The idea behind the paintings was to awaken patriotism in the young king and the need for the liberation and unification of the South Slavs. The painting contains about 70 depicted characters, and the painter gave his facial features to the bearded canopy carrier shown in the painting on the right side of the composition.

== Reception ==
The image caused controversy in the Serbian public. The debate on the topic of valorisation of Murat's work was led by Božidar Nikolajević, Simo Matavulj and Miloje Vasić. Nikolajevic considered that Tsar Dušan was portrayed inadequately as an energetic person who ruled the Balkans. He also criticised the appearance of the crown of Tsar Dušan and the color used. Simo Matavulj replied to Nikolajević and defended Murat's work, stating that he used historical records of Stojan Novaković and Ivo Vojnović, as well as archaeological research by Dragutin Milutinović and Mihailo Valtrović. Miloje Vasić added to the controversy, noting the impossibility of combining a theme worthy of historical painting with modern painterly expressions.

In his critique, Bogdan Popović expressed himself positively about the work. The painting was exhibited in the Serbian pavilion at the World's Fair in Paris in 1900, where it received a positive reception and Murat was awarded a bronze medal. After the success of the exhibition, the negative criticism of the painting ceased. Milan Kašanin and Dejan Medaković noticed the balancing of older traditions and academic postulates in action. The arrival of Emperor Dušan in Dubrovnik is considered to be Murat's most famous painting.

== See also ==
- Marko Murat
