= Stefan Dušan =

14th-century Serbian king and emperor

Stefan Dušan Стефан Душан
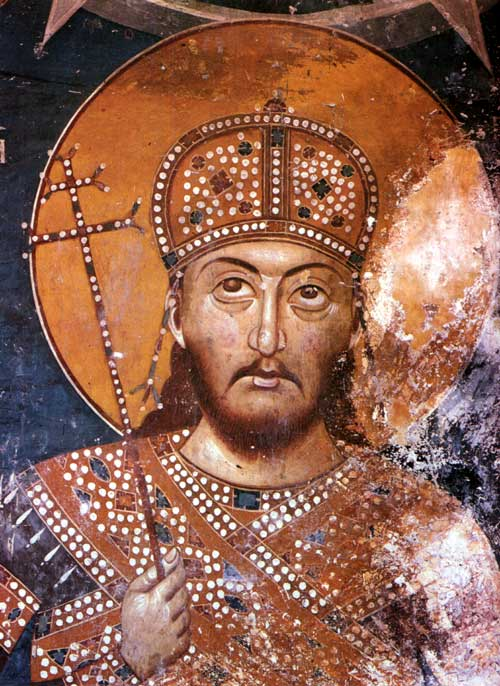
- Detail of fresco in the Lesnovo Monastery, 1350

King of all Serbian and Maritime Lands
- Reign: 8 September 1331 – 16 April 1346
- Predecessor: Stefan Uroš III
- Successor: Stefan Uroš V

Emperor of the Serbs and Greeks
- Reign: 16 April 1346 – 20 December 1355
- Coronation: 16 April 1346, Skopje
- Successor: Stefan Uroš V
- Born: c. 1308
- Died: 20 December 1355 (aged 46–47); Prizren, Serbian Empire
- Burial: Monastery of the Holy Archangels; after 1927: St. Mark's Church
- Spouse: Helena of Bulgaria
- Issue: Stefan Uroš V Theodora Nemanjić; Irina Nemanjić (disputed)
- Dynasty: Nemanjić
- Father: Stefan Uroš III
- Mother: Theodora Smilets of Bulgaria
- Religion: Serbian Orthodox Christian

Stefan Uroš IV Dušan (Serbian Cyrillic: Стефан Урош IV Душан), also known as Dušan the Mighty (Serbian Cyrillic: Душан Силни; c. 1308 – 20 December 1355), was the King of Serbia from 8 September 1331 and Emperor of the Serbs, Greeks, Bulgarians and Albanians from 16 April 1346 until his death in 1355. Dušan is considered one of the greatest medieval Balkan conquerors.

Dušan conquered a large part of Southeast Europe, becoming one of the most powerful monarchs of the era. Under Dušan's rule, Serbia was the most powerful state in Southeast Europe and one of the most powerful European states. At the time, Serbia was an Eastern Orthodox, multi-ethnic, and multilingual empire that stretched from the Danube in the north to the Gulf of Corinth in the south, with its capital in Skopje. He enacted the constitution of the Serbian Empire, known as Dušan's Code, perhaps the most important literary work of medieval Serbia. Dušan promoted the Serbian Church from an archbishopric to a patriarchate, completed his father's mausoleum Visoki Dečani Monastery (now a UNESCO site), and founded the monastery of the Holy Archangels, among others. Under his rule, Serbia reached its territorial, political, economic, and cultural peak.

Stefan Dušan worked to forge a coalition with Venice to address the advancing threat of the Ottoman Turks into Europe. However, his efforts were interrupted by his sudden death in December 1355 at his court in Prizren. After his death, the Serbian Empire began to weaken significantly. With the death of Dušan's successor, Emperor Stefan Uroš V, the empire was definitively divided into numerous independent Serbian states, marking what is historically referred to as the Fall of the Serbian Empire. He was originally buried in his foundation near Prizren, but his remains were later relocated to the Church of Saint Mark in Belgrade, where they rest to this day.

== Background ==
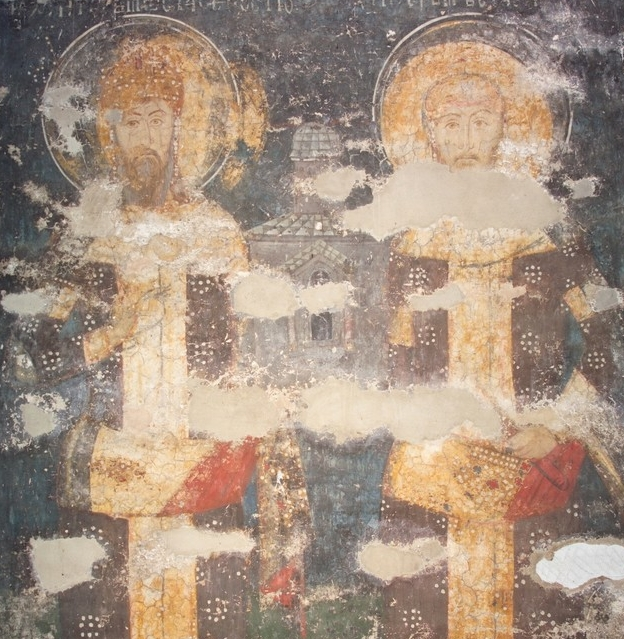
Fresco of Stefan Uroš III and Stefan Dušan, Visoki Dečani Monastery, 14th century (UNESCO)

In 1314, Serbian King Stefan Milutin quarreled with his son, Stefan Dečanski. Milutin sent Dečanski to Constantinople to have him blinded, though he was never totally blinded. Dečanski wrote to Danilo, the bishop of Hum, asking him to intervene with his father. Danilo wrote to Archbishop Nicodemus of Serbia, who spoke with Milutin and persuaded him to recall his son. In 1320 Dečanski was permitted to return to Serbia and was given the appanage of 'Budimlje' (modern Berane), while his half-brother, Stefan Konstantin, held the province of Zeta.

Milutin became ill and died on 29 October 1321, and Konstantin was crowned king. Civil war erupted immediately, as Dečanski and his cousin, Stefan Vladislav II, claimed the throne. Konstantin refused to submit to Dečanski, who then invaded Zeta, defeating and killing Konstantin. Dečanski was crowned king on 6 January 1322 by Nicodemus, and his son, Stefan Dušan, was crowned "young king". Dečanski later granted Zeta to Dušan, indicating him as the intended heir. Since April 1326 Dušan appears in written sources as the "young king" and ruler in Zeta and Zahumlje. From that fact and the "Old Serbian genealogies and annals", in recent works, some Serbian historians write that Dušan was 14 years old probably in March, or April 1326, and that he was born in 1312, not around 1308.

In the meantime, Vladislav II mobilized local support from Rudnik, the former appanage of his father, Stefan Dragutin. Vladislav proclaimed himself king, and he was supported by the Hungarians, consolidating control over his lands and preparing for battle with Dečanski. As was the case with their fathers, Serbia was divided by the two independent rulers; in 1322 and 1323 Ragusan merchants freely visited both lands.

In 1323, war broke out between Dečanski and Vladislav. Rudnik had fallen to Dečanski by the end of 1323, and Vladislav appeared to have fled north. Vladislav was defeated in battle in late 1324 and fled to Hungary, leaving the Serbian throne to Dečanski as undisputed "king of All Serbian and Maritime lands".

== Biography ==
=== Youth and usurpation ===
Dušan was the eldest son of King Stefan Dečanski and Theodora Smilets, the daughter of emperor Smilets of Bulgaria. He was born c. 1308, or in 1312, in Serbia. In 1314 Dušan's father was exiled, and the family lived in Constantinople until his recall in 1320. Dušan became acquainted with the Byzantine Empire during his stay in its capital, learning cultural customs and the Greek language. He was interested in the arts of war; in his youth he fought exceptionally in two battles, defeating Bosnian forces in 1329 during the War of Hum, and the Bulgarian emperor Michael III Shishman in the 1330 Battle of Velbužd. Dečanski appointed his nephew Ivan Stephen (through Anna Neda) to the throne of Bulgaria in August 1330.

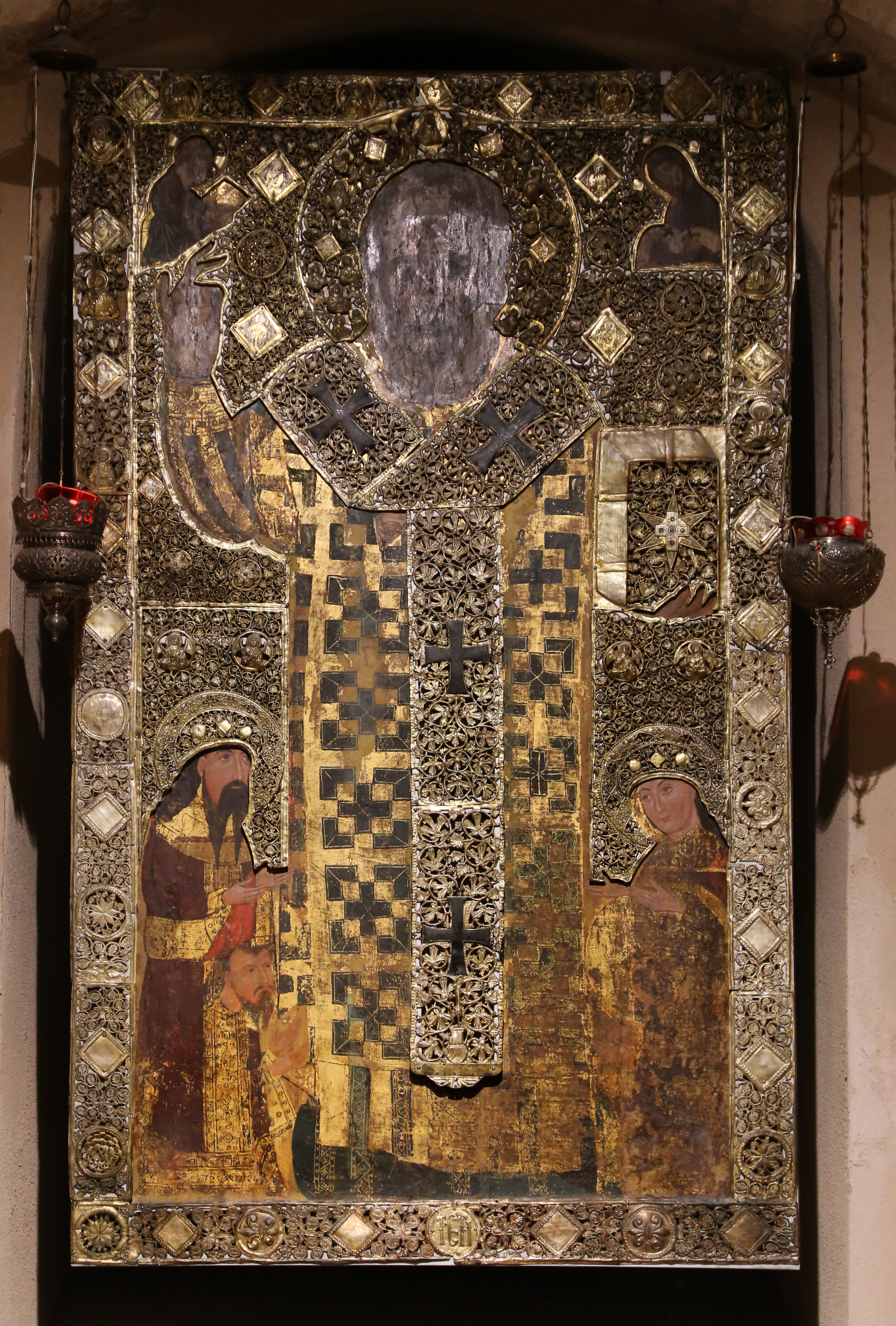
Stefan Dečanski with his son Stefan Dušan (lower left corner) on the icon of St. Nicholas in the Basilica di San Nicola, Bari, Italy

Dečanski's decision not to attack the Byzantines after the victory at Velbazhd, when he had an opportunity, resulted in the alienation of many nobles, who sought to expand to the south. By January or February 1331, Dušan was quarreling with his father, perhaps pressured by the nobility. According to contemporary pro-Dušan sources, advisors turned Dečanski against his son, and he decided to seize and exclude Dušan from his inheritance. Dečanski sent an army into Zeta against his son; the army ravaged Skadar, but Dušan had crossed the Bojana river. A brief period of anarchy took place in parts of Serbia before father and son concluded peace in April 1331. Three months later, Dečanski ordered Dušan to meet him. Dušan feared for his life and his advisors persuaded him to resist, so Dušan marched from Skadar to Nerodimlje, where he besieged his father. Dečanski fled, and Dušan captured the treasury and family. He then pursued his father, catching up with him at Petrich. On 21 August 1331 Dečanski surrendered, and on the advice or insistence of Dušan's advisors, he was imprisoned. Dušan was crowned King of All Serbian and Maritime lands in the first week of September.

=== Personal traits ===
Contemporary writers described Dušan as unusually tall and strong, "the tallest man of his time", very handsome, and a rare leader full of dynamism, quick intelligence, and strength, bearing "a kingly presence". According to contemporary depictions, he had dark hair and brown eyes; in adult age he grew a beard and longer hair.

=== Early reign ===
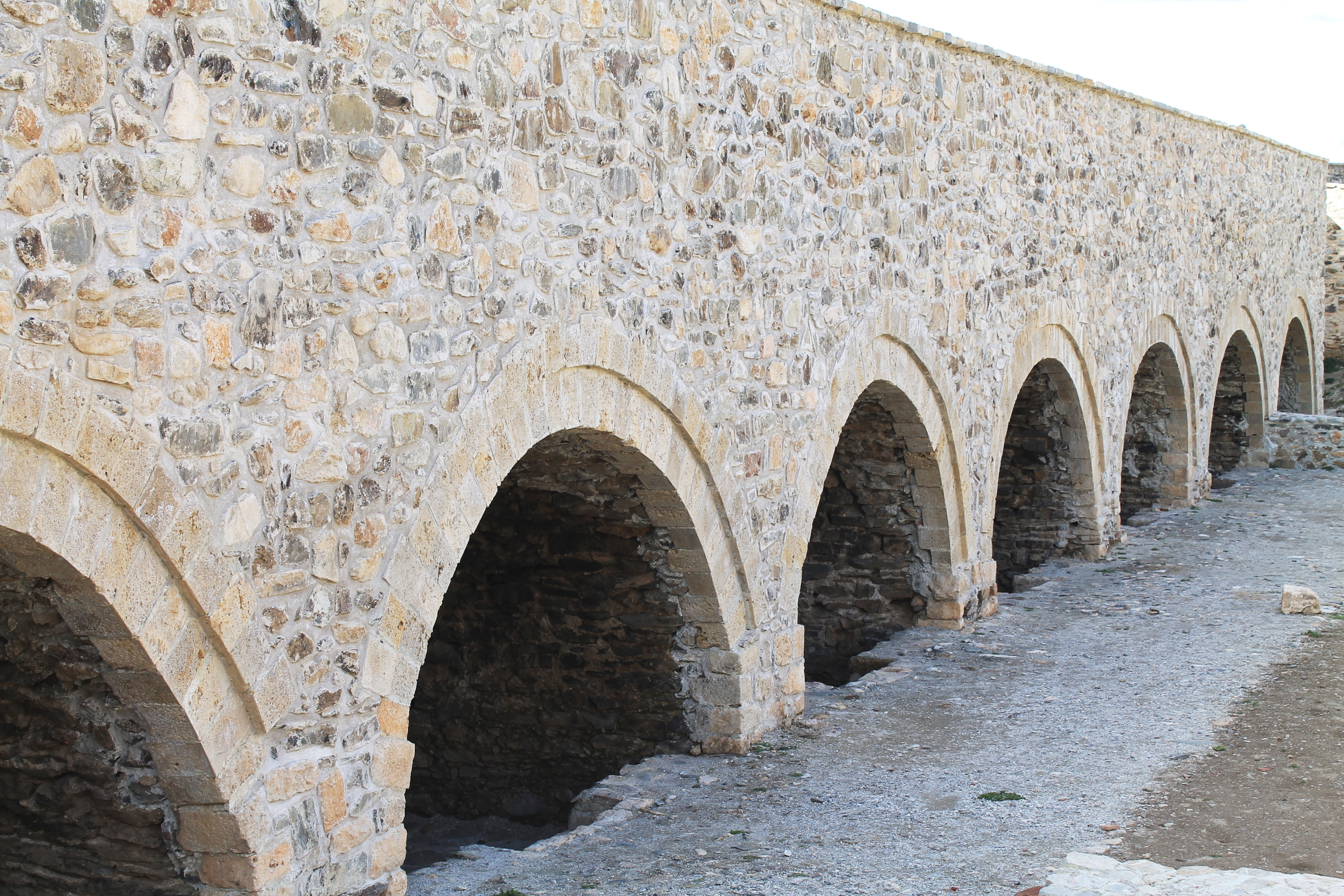
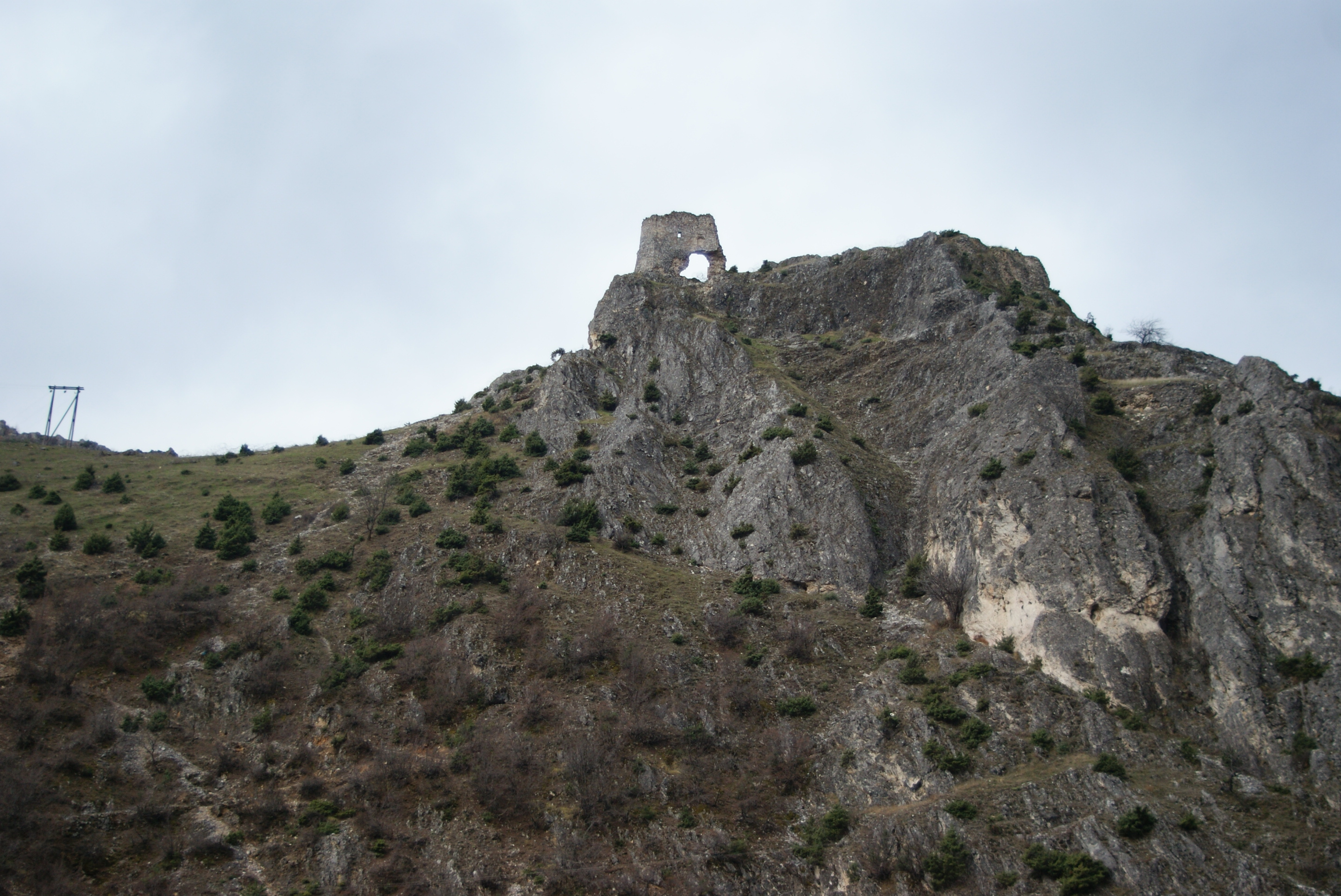
The remains of the Prizren Fortress (left) and Višegrad (right) in Prizren, Dušan's first capital

Serbia made some raids into the Macedonia region in late 1331, but a planned major attack on Byzantium was delayed as Dušan had to suppress revolts in Zeta in 1332. Dušan's ingratitude toward those who had aided his rise – the Zetan nobility may have been neglected their promised reward and greater influence – may have been the cause of the rebellion, which was suppressed in the course of the same year.

"Wedding of Emperor Dušan", by Paja Jovanović

The struggle between Dušan and Stefan Dečanski prevented Serbian intervention in Bulgaria on behalf of Anna and Ivan Stephen and they were overthrown by Ivan Alexander in March 1331, however Ivan Alexander of Bulgaria was aware of future danger from Serbia and immediately sought peace with Dušan. The two rulers concluded peace and formed an alliance, sealed with Dušan's marriage to Ivan Alexander's sister Helen of Bulgaria. Good relations with Bulgaria continued during Dušan's reign and though Bulgaria was weaker then Serbia, it did not suffer any legal dependence.

In 1333 after negotiations with Ragusa, Dušan sold Ston and its envisions, including the Pelješac peninsula and the coastland between Ston and Dubrovnik for eight thousand perpers and an annual tribute of five hundred perpers, the so-called tribute of Ston. Ragusa also had to guarantee freedom of worship for Orthodox believers in this territory.

Dušan began campaigning against the Byzantine Empire in late 1333, when Syrgiannes, a leading Byzantine general, requested Serbian assistance in his revolt against Andronikos III. The Serbs attacked Byzantine Macedonia in the spring of 1334; Syrgiannes contributed his strategic abilities and knowledge of Byzantine positions, and his allies surrendered fortresses to the invaders. Peace was concluded on 26 August 1334, with the Byzantines recognizing Serbian gains in Ohrid, Prilep, Strumitsa, Siderokastron, Chermen and Prosek. Meanwhile Charles I of Hungary, supported by Stephen II of Bosnia, mobilized to attack Serbia from the north. Knowing of Dušan's involvement in the south and not expecting any serious resistance, they penetrated deep into Serbia, reaching the neighborhood of Žiča monastery. Dušan marched north to face the invaders, who quickly withdrew. Charles I was wounded by an arrow but survived. As a result, the Hungarians temporarily lost Mačva and Belgrade in 1335.

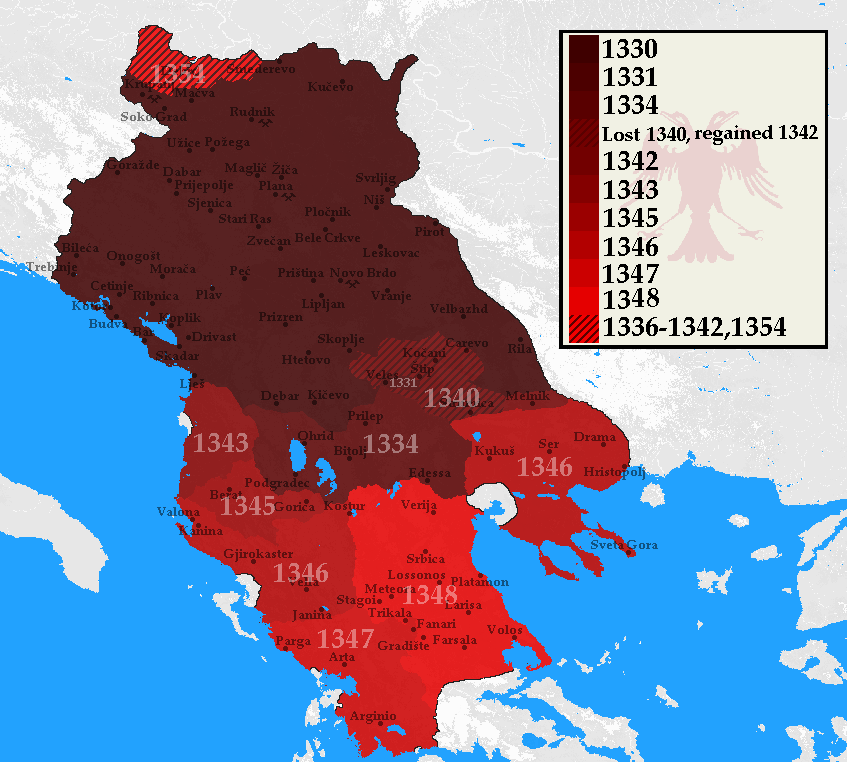
Expansion of Serbia under Stefan Dušan

Dušan exploited the civil war in the Byzantine Empire between the regent of the minor Emperor John V Palaiologos, Anna of Savoy, and his father's general John Kantakouzenos. Dušan and Ivan Alexander picked opposite sides in the conflict but remained at peace with each other, taking advantage of the Byzantine civil war to secure gains for themselves.

Dušan's systematic offensive began in 1342, and in the end he conquered all Byzantine territories in the western Balkans as far as Kavala, except for the Peloponnesus and Thessaloniki, which he could not besiege due to his small fleet. There has been speculation that Dušan's ultimate goal was no less than to conquer Constantinople and replace the declining Byzantine Empire with a united Orthodox Greco-Serbian Empire under his control. In May 1344, his commander Preljub was stopped at Stephaniana by a Turkic force of 3,100. The Turks won the battle, but the victory was not enough to thwart the Serbian conquest of Macedonia. Faced with Dušan's aggression, the Byzantines sought allies in the Ottoman Turks, whom they brought into Europe for the first time.

In 1343, Dušan added "of Romans" to his self-styled title "King of Serbia, Albania and the coast" ("Romans" is equivalent to "Greeks" in Serbian documents). In another instance, in a charter issued to the fortified city of Krujë, Dušan referred to himself as "King of the Bulgarians". In 1345 he began calling himself tsar, equivalent of Emperor, as attested in charters to two athonite monasteries, one from November 1345 and the other from January 1346, and around Christmas 1345 at a council meeting in Serres, which had been conquered on 25 September 1345, he proclaimed himself "Tsar of the Serbs and Romans".

=== Imperial coronation and autocephaly of the Serbian church ===
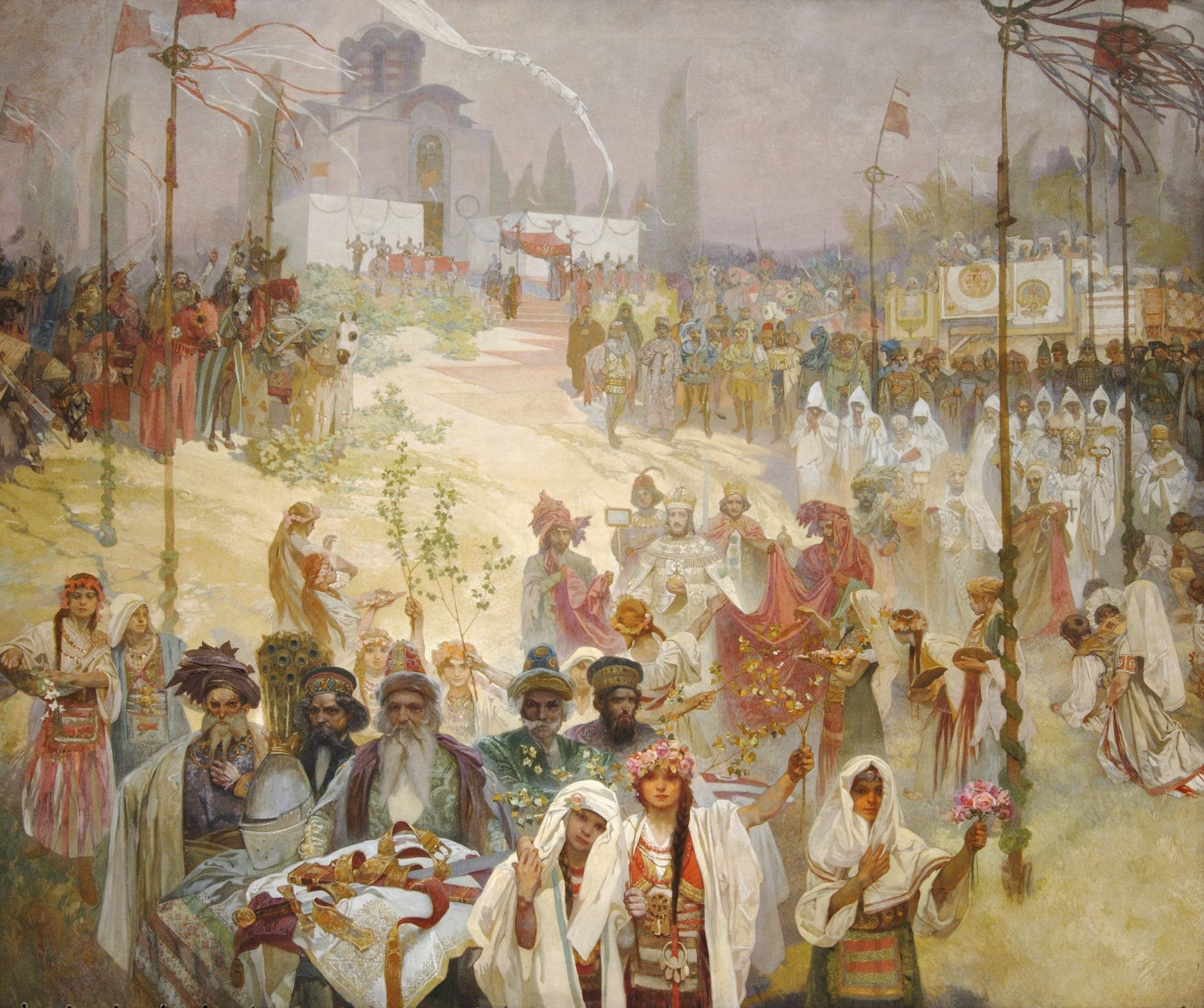
The coronation of the Emperor Stefan Dušan in Skopje (1926), part of The Slav Epic series by Alphonse Mucha

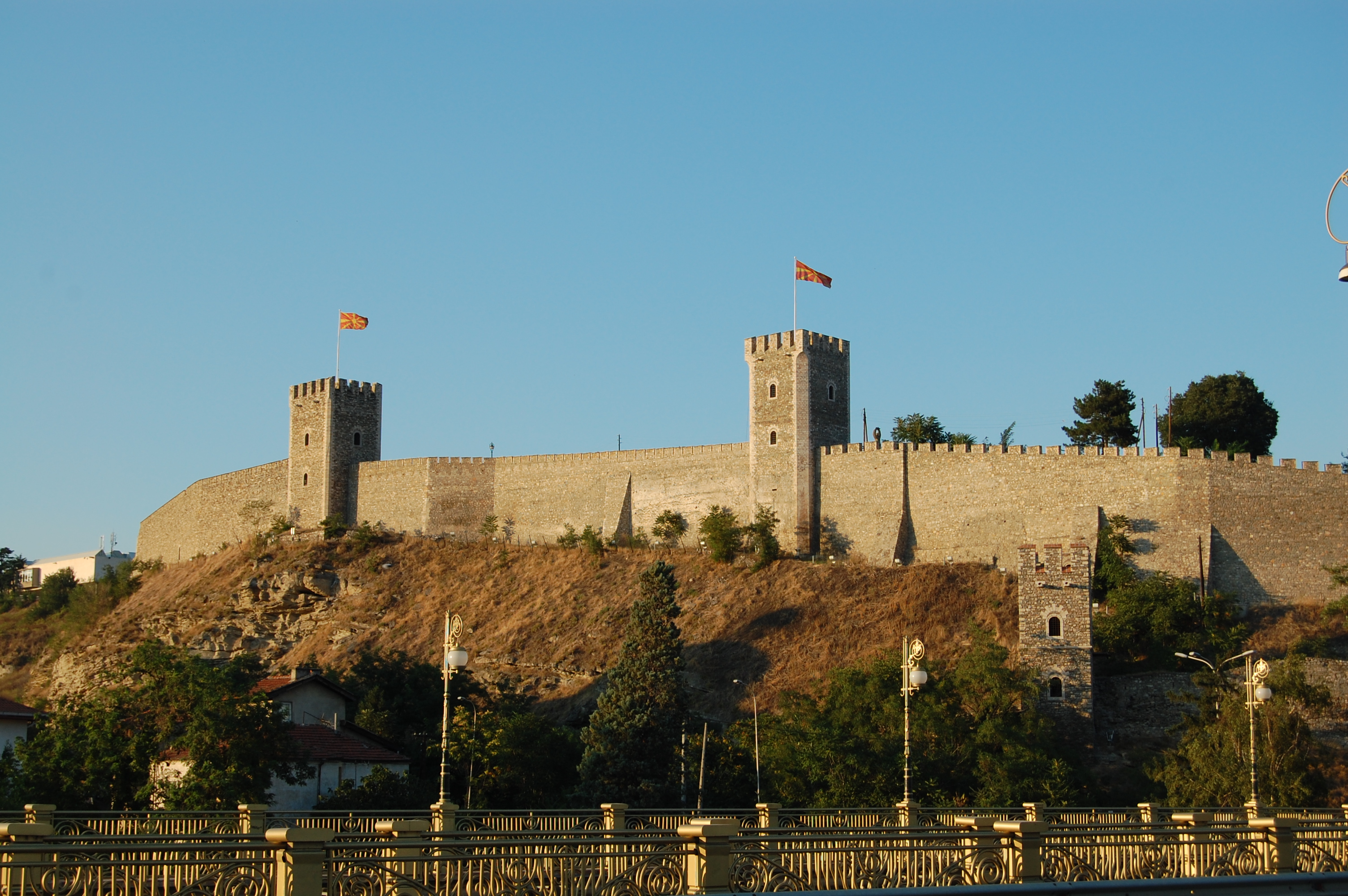
Skopje Fortress, where Dušan adopted the title of Emperor at his coronation

On 16 April 1346 (Easter), Dušan convoked a huge assembly at Skopje, attended by the Serbian Archbishop Joanikije II, the Archbishop of Ochrid Nikolas I, the Bulgarian Patriarch Simeon, and various religious leaders of Mount Athos. The assembly and clerics agreed upon, and then ceremonially performed, the raising of the autocephalous Serbian Archbishopric to the status of Serbian Patriarchate. The Archbishop from then on was titled Serbian Patriarch, although some documents called him Patriarch of Serbs and Romans, with the seat at the Monastery of Peć. The first Serbian Patriarch Joanikije II solemnly crowned Dušan as "Emperor and autocrat of Serbs and Romans" (Greek Bασιλεὺς καὶ αὐτoκράτωρ Σερβίας καὶ Pωμανίας). Dušan had his son Uroš crowned King of Serbs and Greeks, giving him nominal rule over the Serbian lands, and although Dušan was governing the whole state, he had special responsibility for the Eastern Roman lands. A further increase in the Byzantinization of the Serbian court followed, particularly in court ceremonial and titles. As Emperor, Dušan could grant titles only possible as an Emperor. In the years that followed, Dušan's half-brother Symeon Uroš and brother-in-law Jovan Asen became despotes. Jovan Oliver already had the despot title, granted to him by Andronikos III. His brother-in-law Dejan Dragaš and Branko Mladenović were granted the title of sebastocrator. The military commanders (voivodes) Preljub and Vojihna received the title of caesar. The raising of the Serbian Patriarch resulted in the same spirit as bishoprics became metropolitans, as for example the Metropolitanate of Skopje.

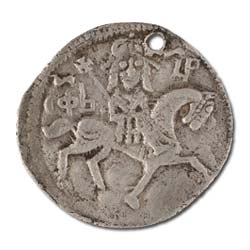
Coin of Emperor Stefan Dušan

The Serbian Patriarchate took over sovereignty on Mt. Athos and the Greek eparchies under the jurisdiction of the Ecumenical Patriarchate of Constantinople, while the Archbishopric of Ohrid remained autocephalous. For those acts he was excommunicated by the Ecumenical Patriarch of Constantinople in 1350.

=== Epirus and Thessaly ===
In 1347, Dušan conquered Epirus, Aetolia and Acarnania, appointing his half-brother, despot Simeon Uroš, as governor of those provinces. In 1348, Dušan also conquered Thessaly, appointing Preljub as governor. In eastern regions of Macedonia, he appointed Vojihna as governor of Drama. Once Dušan conquered Byzantine possessions in western regions, he sought to obtain Constantinople. To acquire the city, he needed a fleet. Knowing that fleets of southern Serbian Dalmatian towns were not strong enough to overcome Constantinople, he opened negotiations with Venice, with which he maintained fairly good relations. Venice feared a reduction of privileges in the Empire if Serbs became the masters of Constantinople over the weakened Byzantines. But had the Venetians allied with Serbia, Dušan would have examined existing privileges. Once he became master of all Byzantine lands (especially Thessalonika and Constantinople) the Venetians would have gained privileges. But Venice chose to avoid a military alliance. While Dušan sought Venetian aid against Byzantium, the Venetians sought Serbian support in the struggle against the Hungarians over Dalmatia. Sensing that Serbian aid would result in a Venetian obligation to Serbia, Venice politely turned down Dušan's offers of help.

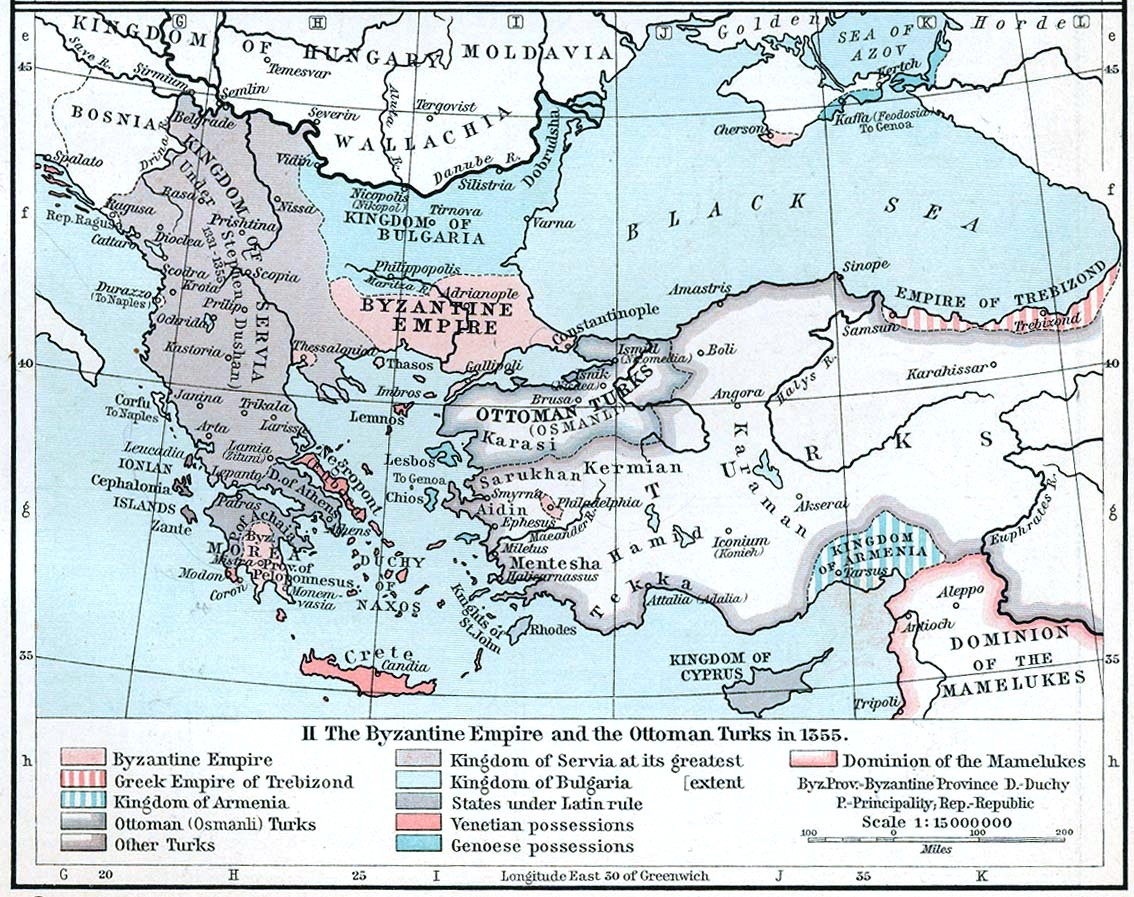
Serbian Empire and neighbors at death of Tsar Dušan, 1355

While Dušan launched the Bosnian campaign (with the troops previously based in Macedonia and Thessaly), Kantakouzenos tried to regain lands Byzantium had lost. In his support, the Constantinopolitan patriarch Kallistos excommunicated Dušan to discourage the Greek population in Dušan's Greek provinces from supporting the Serbian administration and thereby assist the Kantakouzenos campaign. The excommunication did not stop Dušan's relations with Mount Athos, which still addressed him as Emperor, though rather as Emperor of Serbs than Emperor of Serbs and Greeks.

Kantakouzenos raised a small army and took the Chalcidic peninsula, then Veria and Voden. Veria was the richest town in the Bottiaea region. Dušan had earlier replaced many Greeks with Serbs, including a Serb garrison. However, the remaining locals were able to open the gates for Kantakouzenos in 1350. Voden resisted Kantakouzenos but was taken by assault. Kantakouzenos then marched toward Thessaly, but was stopped at Servia by Caesar Preljub and his army of 500 men. The Byzantine force retired to Veria, and the aiding Turk contingent went off plundering, reaching Skopje. Once the news of the Byzantine campaign reached Dušan in Hum, he quickly reassembled his forces from Bosnia and Hum and marched for Thessaly.

When Stefan Dušan reached Macedonia, the Byzantine forces withdrew to Thrace. Dušan retook Voden after a short siege, soon retaking Veria and other territories that Kantakouzenos had taken.

=== War with the Bosnian Banate ===
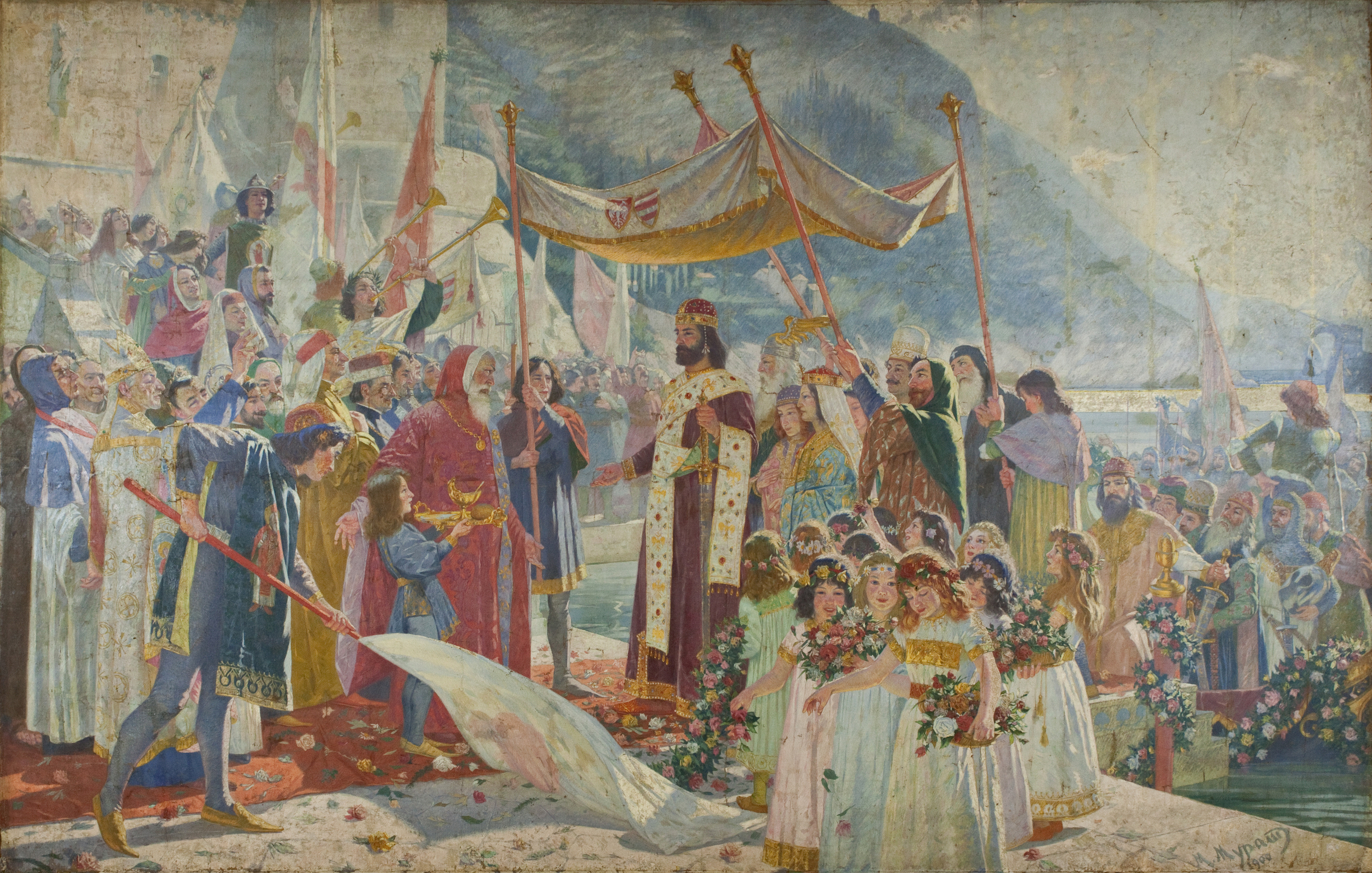
The arrival of Emperor Dušan in Dubrovnik by Marko Murat.

Dušan evidently wanted to expand his rule over the provinces that had earlier been in the hands of Serbia, such as Hum, which was annexed by Bosnian Ban Stephen II Kotromanić in 1326. In 1329, the Ban launched an attack on Lord Vitomir, who held Travunia and Konavle. The Bosnian army was defeated at Pribojska Banja by Dušan, still Young King. The Ban soon took over Nevesinje and the rest of Bosnia. Petar Toljenović, the Lord of "seaside Hum" and a distant relative of Dušan, sparked a rebellion against the new ruler, but he was soon captured and died in prison.

In 1350, Dušan attacked Bosnia, seeking to regain the previously lost land of Hum and stop raids on his tributaries at Konavle. Venice sought a settlement between the two, but failed. In October, he invaded Hum, with an army said to be of 80,000 men, and successfully occupied part of the disputed territory. According to Orbini, Dušan had secretly been in contact with various Bosnian nobles, offering them bribes for support, and many nobles, chiefly of Hum, were ready to betray the Ban, such as the Nikolić family which was kin to the Nemanjić. The Ban avoided any major confrontation and did not meet Dušan in battle; he instead retired to the mountains and made small hit-and-run actions. Most of Bosnia's fortresses held out, but some nobles submitted to Dušan. The Serbs ravaged much of the countryside. With one army they reached Duvno and Cetina; a second army reached Krka, on which lay Knin (modern Croatia); and a third army took Imotski and Novi, where they left garrisons and entered Hum. From this position of strength, Dušan tried to negotiate peace with the Ban, sealing it by the marriage of Dušan's son Uroš with Stephen's daughter Elizabeth, who would receive Hum as her dowry – restoring it to Serbia but the Ban was not willing to consider this proposal.

Dušan may have also launched the campaign to aid his sister, Jelena, who married Mladen III Šubić of Klis, Omiš and Skradin, in 1347. Mladen died from Black Death (bubonic plague) in 1348, and Jelena sought to maintain the rule of the cities for herself and her son. She was challenged by Hungary and Venice, so the dispatch of Serbian troops to western Hum and Croatia may have been for her aid, as operations in this region were unlikely to help Dušan conquer Hum. If Dušan had intended to aid Jelena, rising trouble in the East precluded this. In 1335, Pope Clement VI demanded that Dušan stop the persecution of Catholics and return monasteries, churches, islands and villages taken by his predecessors to the bishop of Kotor, responsible for the Roman Catholic Diocese of Trebinje.

=== Last years and Death ===
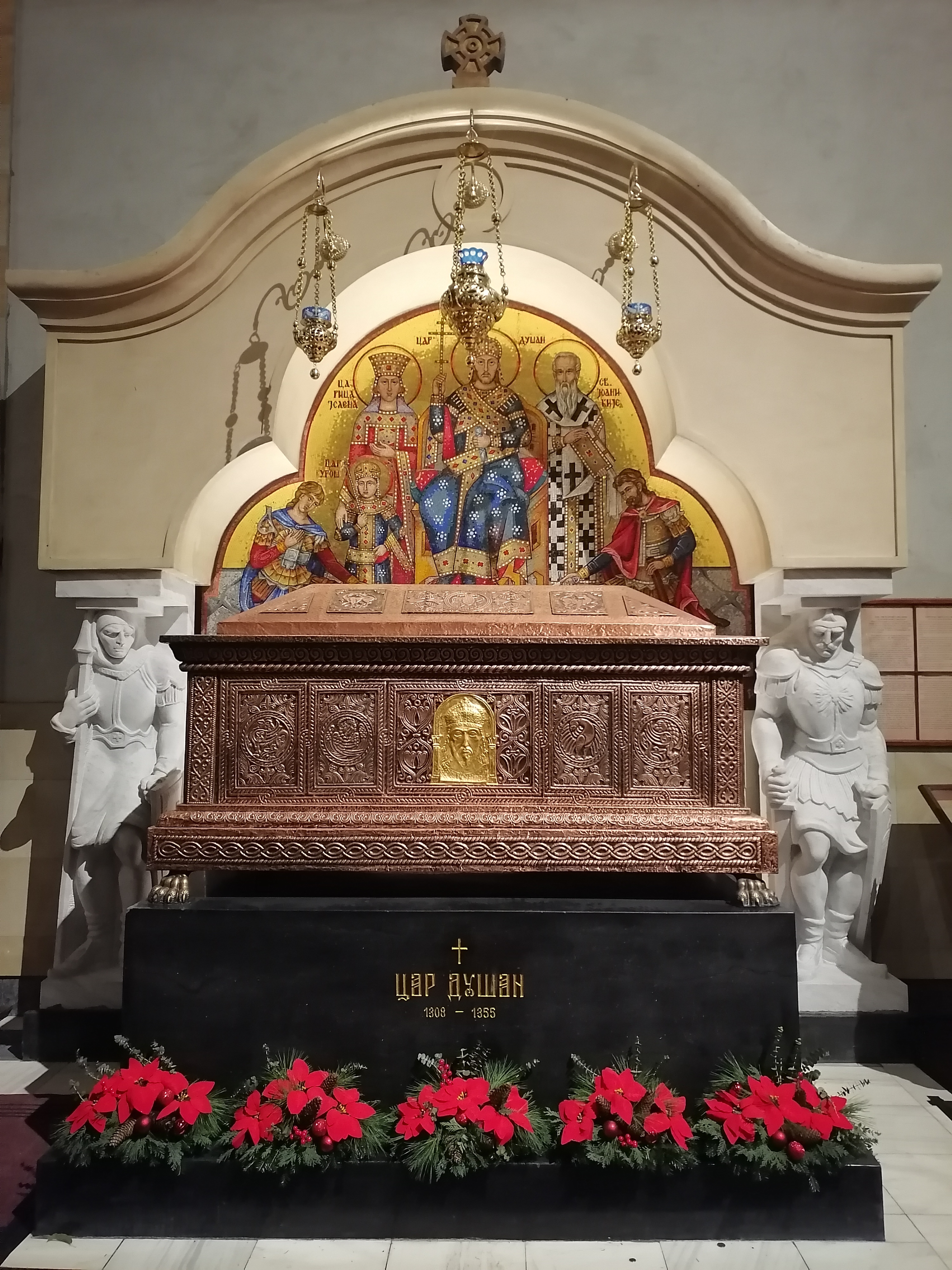
Sarcophagus of Stefan Dušan, kept at St. Mark's church, Belgrade

In 1354, Dušan was attacked by the Hungarians who managed to occupy part of northern Serbia. At this point, Dušan began corresponding with the pope, stating that he was ready to recognize papal supremacy. Since there is no other evidence that Dušan was seriously attracted to Catholicism, this was most likely a diplomatic action to improve relations with papacy while Serbia was endangered by Hungary. Dušan successfully repelled the Hungarian invasion, preserving or even extending his original borders in the north. When the Hungarians retreated from Serbia, he did not continue the correspondence with the pope. Peace with Louis I of Hungary was concluded in May 1355. Dušan had grand intentions to capture Constantinople, and to place himself at the head of a grand crusading army to drive the Muslim Turks from Europe. His premature death created a large power vacuum in the Balkans, that ultimately enabled Turkish invasion and their dominance over the Balkans until the early 20th century. While mounting a crusade against the Turks, he suddenly died on 20 December 1355. He was buried in his foundation, the Monastery of the Holy Archangels near Prizren.

His empire slowly crumbled. His son and successor Stefan Uroš V could not keep the integrity of the Empire intact for long, as several feudal families immensely increased their power, though nominally acknowledging Uroš V as Emperor. Simeon Uroš, Dušan's half-brother, had proclaimed himself Emperor after the death of Dušan, ruling a large area of Thessaly and Epirus, which he had received from Dušan.

Today Dušan's remains are located in the Church of Saint Mark in Belgrade. Dušan is the only monarch of the Nemanjić dynasty who has not been canonised as a saint.

== Religious activity ==
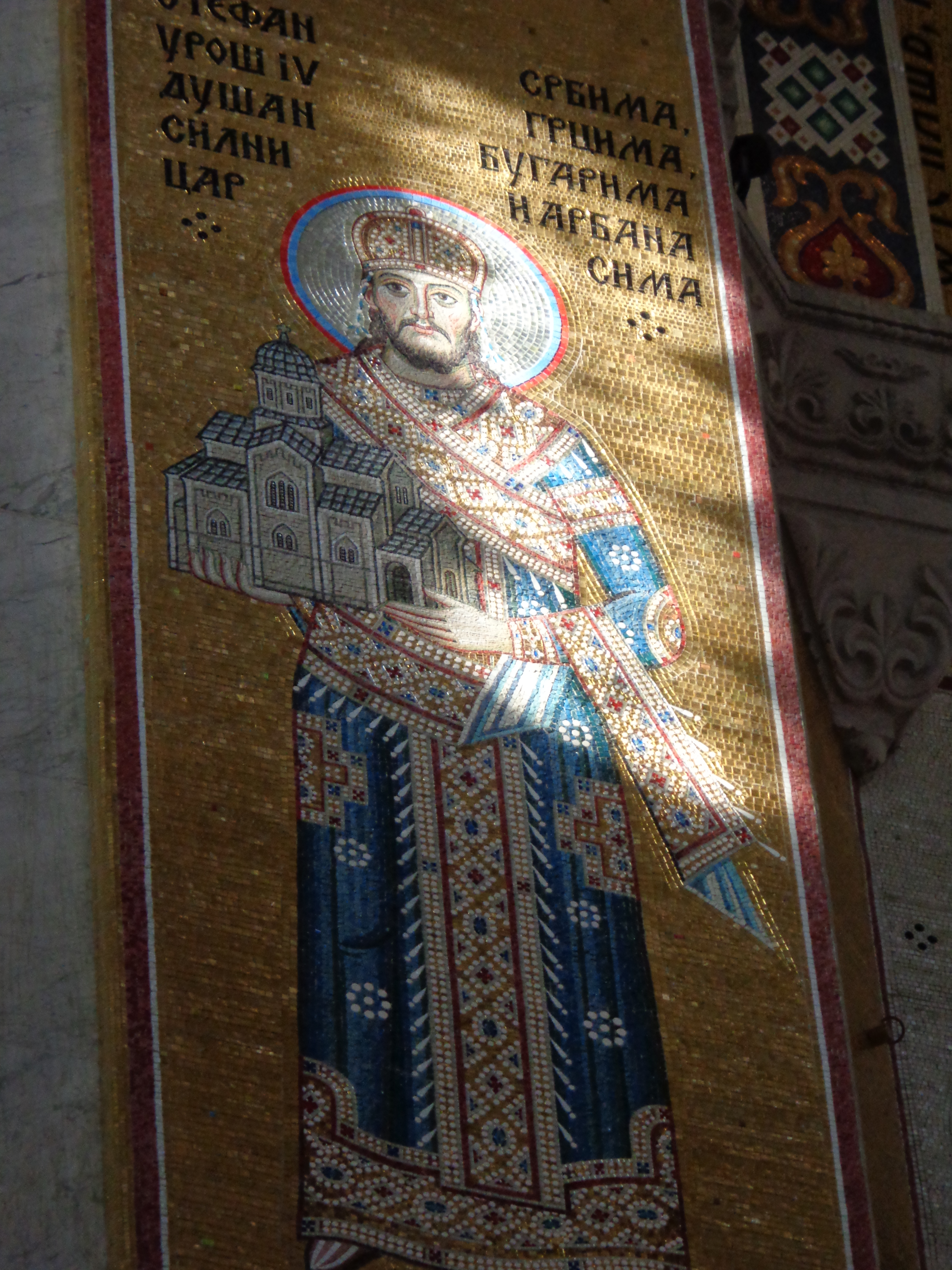
Mosaic, Church of Saint Sava, Belgrade

Much like his ancestors, Dušan was very active in renovating churches and monasteries, and also in founding new ones. First, he cared for the monasteries in which his parents were buried. Both the Banjska monastery, built by King Milutin, where his mother was buried, and the monastery of Visoki Dečani, an endowment of his father, were generously looked after. The monastery was built for eight years and it is certain that Dušan's role in the building process was huge. Between 1337 and 1339, Dušan became ill, and he gave his word that if he survived, he would build a church and monastery in Jerusalem. At the time, there was one Serbian monastery in Jerusalem, dedicated to Archangel Michael (believed to be founded by King Milutin), and a number of Serbian monks at the Sinai Peninsula.

His greatest endowment was the Saint Archangels Monastery, located near the town of Prizren, in which he was originally buried. Dušan gave many possessions to this monastery, including the forest of Prizren which was supposed to be a special property of the monastery where all precious goods and relics were to be stored.

His son, Stefan Uroš V, did not make peace with the Constantinopolitan Patriarch. The first initiative was made by despot Uglješa Mrnjavčević in 1368, which resulted in the areas under his rule being restored to Constantinople. The final initiative for reconciliation between the two churches came from Prince Lazar in 1375. There is no evidence of an existing cult of Emperor Dušan in the decades after his death. His charter to Ragusa (Dubrovnik) served as a statute in the future trade between Serbia and Ragusa, and its regulations were deemed inviolable. His legacy was esteemed in Ragusa. Later folk tradition in Serbia included various attitudes toward Dušan, mostly negative, made under the influence of the church.

=== Church policy ===
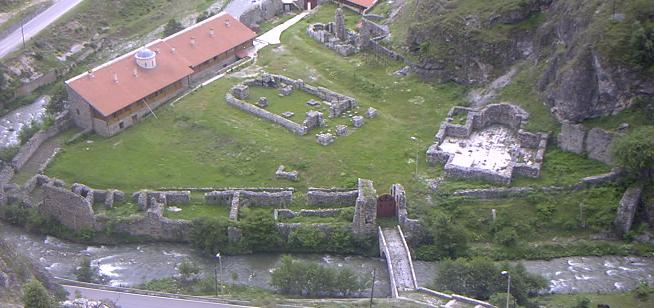
Monastery of the Holy Archangels in Prizren

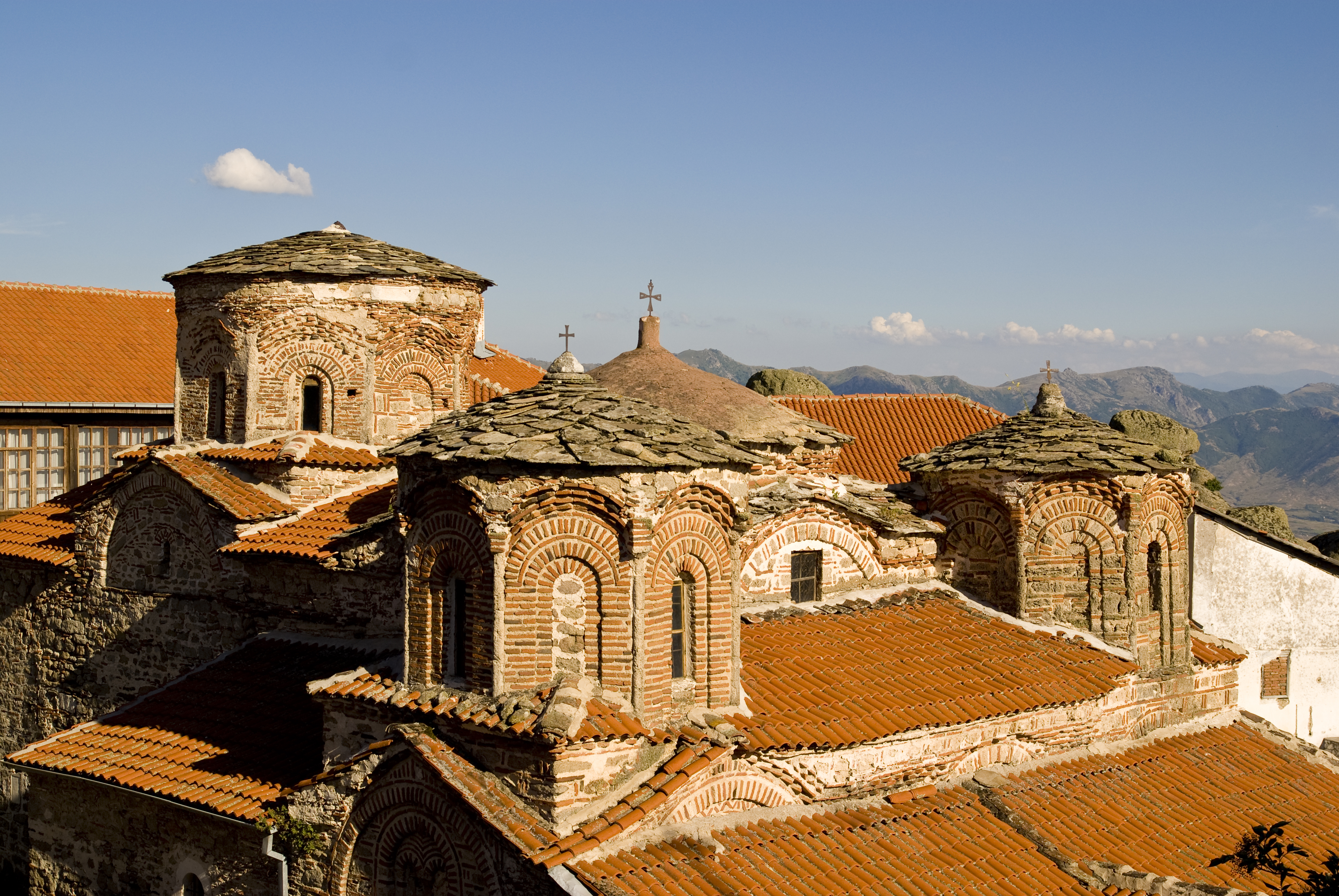
Treskavec Monastery near Prilep

With the raising of the Serbian Archbishopric to a Patriarchate, serious changes in the organization of the church followed. Joanikije II became Patriarch. Bishoprics (Eparchies) were raised to Metropolitanates, and new territories of the Ochrid Archbishopric and Ecumenical Constantinople were added to the jurisdiction of the Serbian church. The Ecumenical Patriarchate of Constantinople had Dušan excommunicated in 1350, although this did not affect the religious organization. Dušan rejected Constantinople's claims to authority over the Serbian Church and contemplated a religious union with the Latin Church. In 1354, Dušan reached out to the Papal States, offering to recognise Pope Innocent VI as the "father of all Christians" and to solidify a union between the Catholic and Serbian Church, in exchange for supporting Dušan in his plans for a military crusade against the Turks. Dušan's plans were welcomed, however such plans never materialized due to his death in 1355.

Under Serbian jurisdiction came one of the foremost centers of spirituality – Mount Athos. As of November 1345, Athonite monks accepted his supreme rule, and Dušan guaranteed autonomy, also giving a row of economic privileges, with tremendous gifts and endowments. The monks of Chilandar (the cradle of the Serbian church, founded by Saint Sava, Dušan's ancestor) came at the front of the ecclesiastical community.

In his codex, Dušan accentuates his role as a protector of Christianity and points out the independence of the church. From the codex we can also see care that the parishes are equally arranged both in cities and villages. He also took care of the few churches and monasteries from Bari in the west to Jerusalem in the east.

Besides Orthodox Christians, there were many Catholics in the Empire, mostly in the coastal cities of Cattaro, Alessio (modern Lezhë) etc. Catholics were also present on his court (servants from Cattaro and Ragusa, mercenaries, guests etc.). In the central parts, Saxons were present in areas active in mining and trading. Serbia under Dušan claimed its identity through Orthodoxy and opposition to Catholicism. Catholics were persecuted, especially Catholic Albanians.

== Reign ==
=== Royal ideology ===
Divellion of Emperor Dušan

Some historians consider that the goal of Emperor Dušan was to establish a new, Serbian-Greek Empire, replacing the Byzantine Empire. Ćirković considered his initial ideology as that of the previous Bulgarian emperors, who had envisioned co-rulership. However, starting in 1347, relations with John VI Kantakouzenos worsened, Dušan allied himself with rival John V Palaiologos.

Dušan was the first Serbian monarch who wrote most of his letters in Greek, also signing with the Imperial red ink. He was the first to publish prostagma, a kind of Byzantine document, characteristic for Byzantine rulers. In his royal title, Emperor of the Serbs and Greeks, his claim as Eastern Roman (Byzantine) successor is clear. He also gave Byzantine court titles to his nobility, something that would continue into the 16th century.

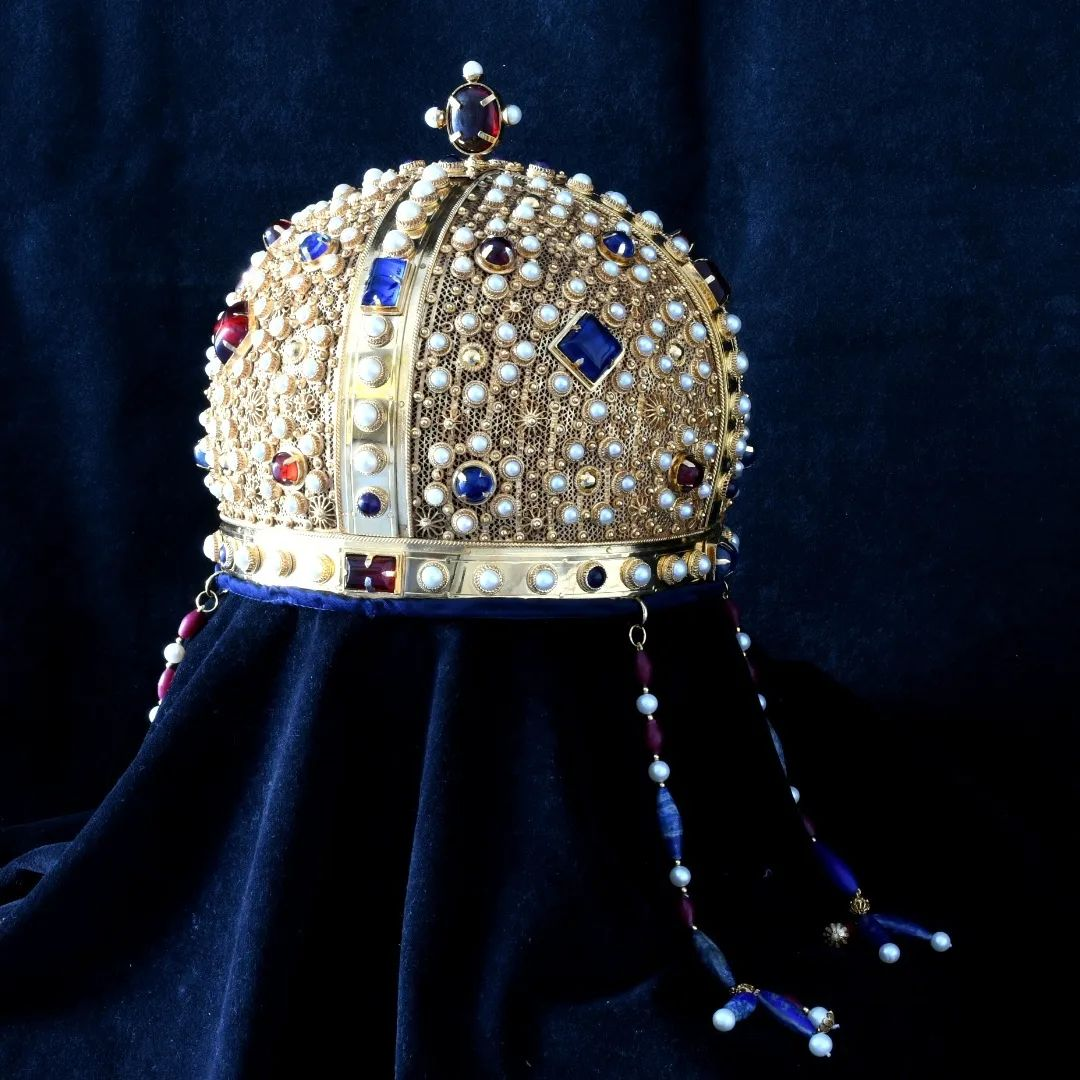
Reconstructed crown of Emperor Stefan Dušan

Dušan's empire was multinational, with the three most important groups being Serbs, Greeks and Albanians. Different laws applied in the Serbian and Greek territories under Dušan's control, but the Albanians were largely left to manage their lands under the leadership of their chiefs. His policies soon changed, and the laws against the Albanians became harsher with Albanian Catholics being forcibly converted into Orthodoxy and their churches were converted as well, while some of them migrated towards Greece, leaving empty villages behind, which were then taken by Slavic settlers. By allowing the Greeks to retain much of the landed property they held under the existing laws prior to Dušan's conquest, Dušan was able to maintain order in the Greek territories and gain the loyalty of its inhabitants. In conquered Greek towns, local Greeks were given official administrative positions to better manage the settlement without upsetting the local populace, but a Serb governor would preside over the administration and command over a Serb garrison to ensure that the locals could not resist Dušan's orders. As such, existing Byzantine laws continued to exist in the Greek territories, supplemented by specific edicts or charters issued by Dušan himself. Similarly, Dušan did not transform the Serbian and Albanian territories under his control by introducing a Byzantine administrative system.

=== Lawmaker ===
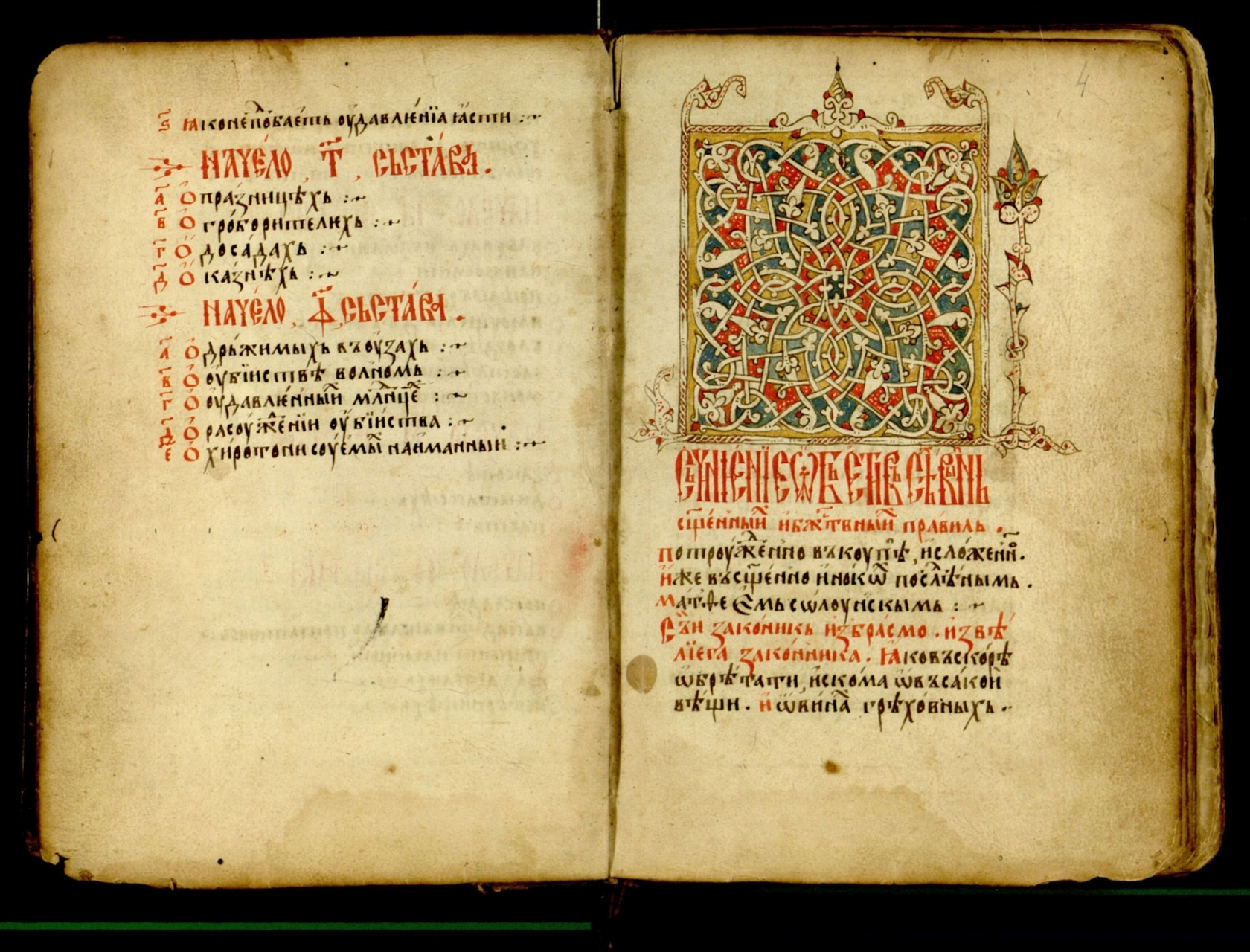
Dušan Code, the second oldest preserved Serbian proto-constitution

"The Proclamation of Dušan's Law Codex" by Paja Jovanović

In Serbia itself, Dušan had initially retained the existing tax system and legal structure. Prior to Dušan's reign, the Serbian state had functioned under its customary law. This customary law was supplemented by Saint Sava in the early 13th century, in which he added a Church canon law code that covered many matters of civil and family law. Aside from these standard laws, Serbian rulers could also issue edicts for a specific region or the nation as a whole, or grant charters and privileges to monasteries, noblemen, or merchant and miner communities. Dušan eventually decided to introduce a more general code, culminating in the introduction of Dušan Code in 1349.

For the purposes of Dušan Code, a wealth of charters were published, and some great foreign works of law were translated to Serbian; however, the third section of the Code was new and distinctively Serbian, albeit with Byzantine influence and attention to a long legal tradition in Serbia. Dušan explained the purpose of his Code in one of his charters; he intimated that its aims were spiritual and that the code would help his people to save themselves for the afterlife. The Code was proclaimed on 21 May 1349 in Skopje, and contained 155 clauses, while 66 further clauses were added at Serres in 1353 or 1354. The authors of the code are not known, but they were probably court officials who specialised in law.

The Code proclaims on subjects both secular and ecclesiastic, the more so because Serbia had recently achieved full ecclesiastic autonomy as an independent Orthodox Church under a Patriarchate. The first 38 clauses relate to the church and they deal with issues that the Medieval Serbian Church faced, while the next 25 clauses relate to the nobility. Civil law is largely excluded, since it was covered in earlier documents, namely Saint Sava's Nomokamon and in Corpus Juris Civilis. The Code originally dealt with criminal law, with heavy emphasis on the concept of lawfulness, which was mostly taken directly from Byzantine law.

The original manuscript of the Code has not survived. The Code remained a de facto constitution under the rule of Dušan's son, Stefan Uroš V, and after the fall of the Serbian Empire in 1371, it was used in all the successor provinces. It was officially used in the successor state, Serbian Despotate, until its annexation by the Ottoman Empire in 1459. It was used as a reference for Serbian communities under Turkish rule, which exercised considerable legal autonomy in civil cases. It was also used in the Serbian autonomical areas under the Republic of Venice, like Grbalj and Paštrovići. It is the first recorded code of Serbian public law, and Dušan hoped that its introduction would bring uniformity in Serbian territories, which were the only portions of his empire where the code actually applied.

Dušan appointed Serbs to the highest military and civil positions within the empire for a number of reasons; not only did it allow him to maintain order by having loyal subjects hold positions of power, but it also appeased the Serb nobility, which demanded rewards such as land and positions of authority. This extended to the Church, in which Serbs were appointed to the highest episcopal positions, thereby replacing the Greeks.

=== Military tactics ===
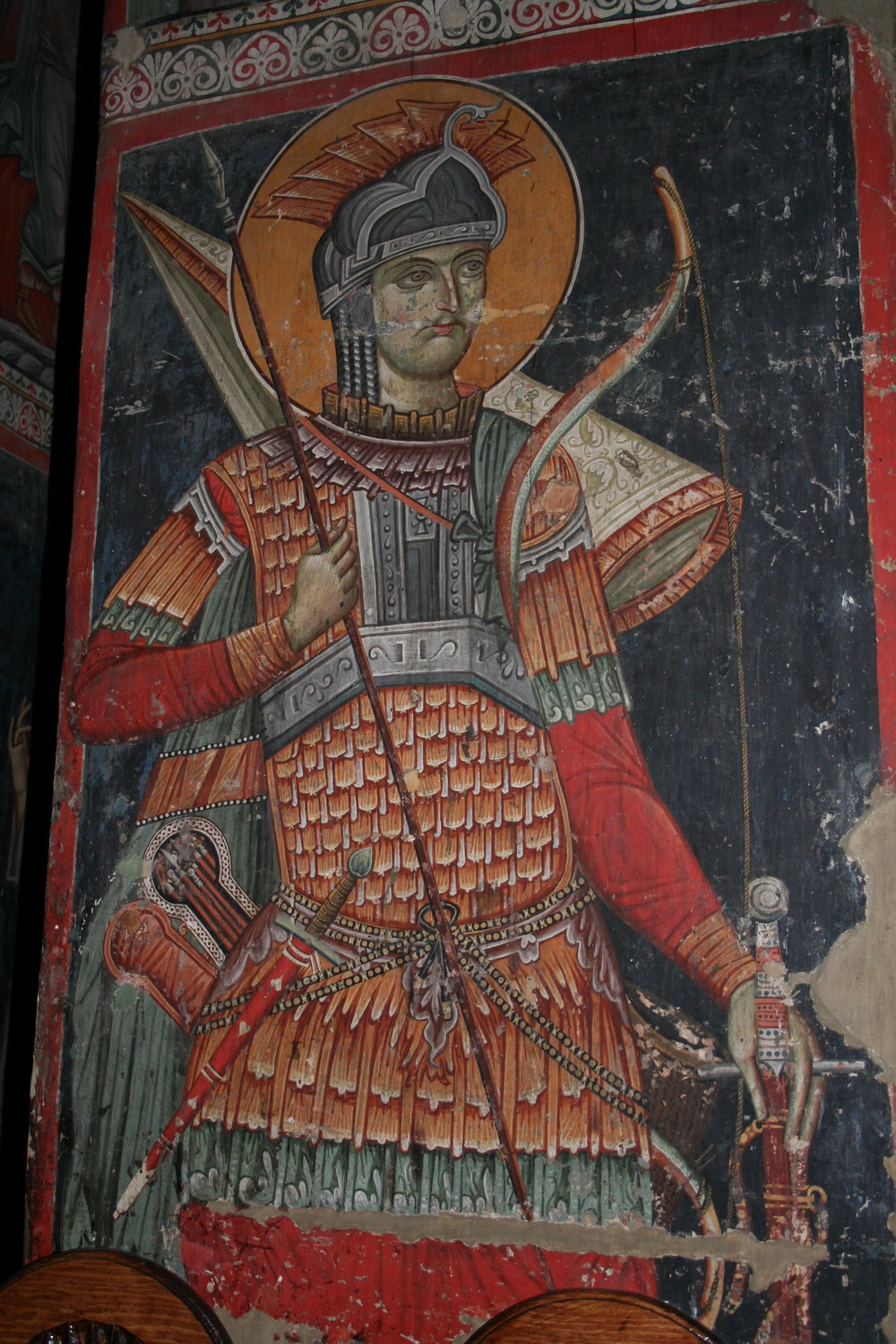
Serbian military uniform, depicted in fresco in Lesnovo Monastery

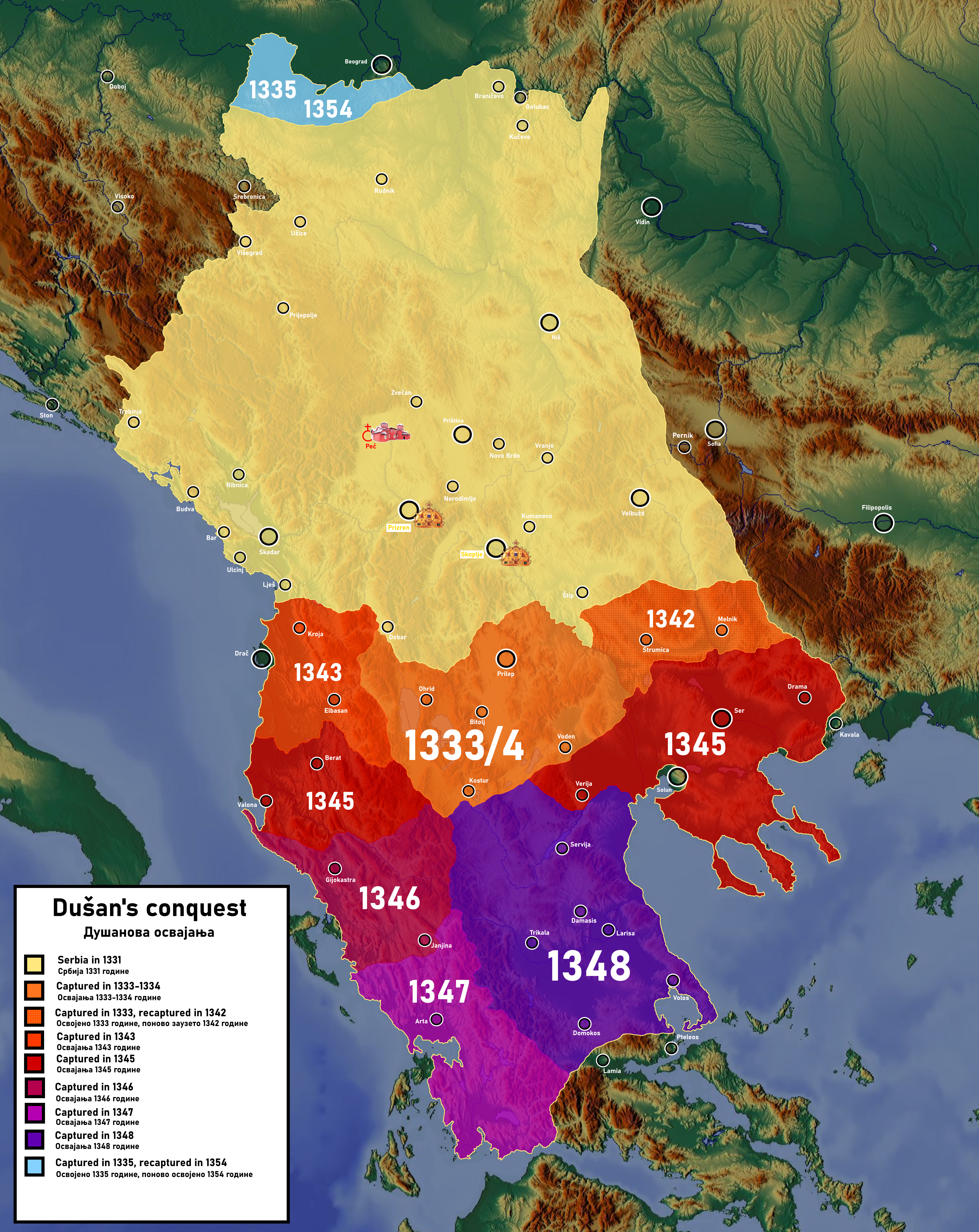
Map of expansion of Serbian state under Stefan Dušan

Serbian tactics favored wedge shaped heavy cavalry attacks with horse archers on the flanks. Many foreign mercenaries were in the Serbian army in the 14th century, mostly German knights and Catalan halberdiers. The Serbian army that defeated the Bulgarians at the Battle of Velbazhd in 1330 was composed of 15,000 Serbs, 2,000 Italians from the Kingdom of Naples, and 1,000 German mercenaries. Dušan had his personal mercenary guard on his disposal, consisting of German knights led by Palman, commander of the Serbian "Alemannic Guard", who upon crossing Serbia to Jerusalem in 1331, became the leader of all mercenaries in the Serbian army. The main strength of the Serbian army were their heavy cavalry, feared for their ferocious charge and staying power. The imperial army of Stefan Dušan was built on existing military administration of Byzantium. Although the Vlach cavalry of Thessaly was disbanded, his army included Serbian feudal forces, Albanians and Greeks. Dušan recruited a light cavalry composed of 15,000 Albanians, armed with spears and swords.

The Serbian expansion in the former territory of the Byzantine Empire proceeded without major field battles, as it was based on scattered attacks and besieging Byzantine fortifications. The army Dušan used to conquer Byzantine territories consisted primarily of Serbs and Albanians, also including German and other western mercenaries.

== Name, epithets and titles ==
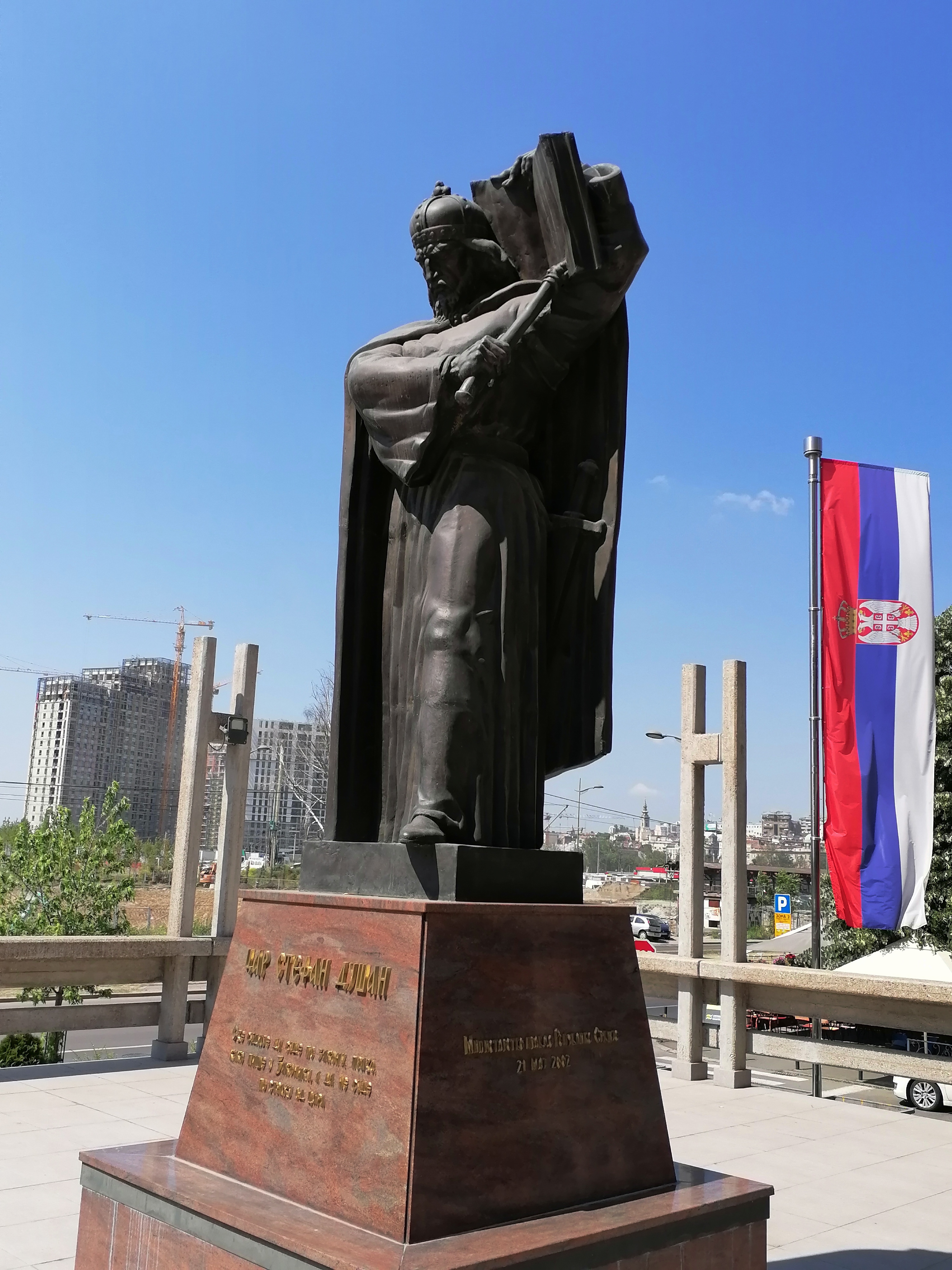
Statue of Emperor Dušan in Belgrade

He was crowned Young King as heir apparent on 6 January 1322 but he was too young to really rule with his father in 1322. and later in April 1326 Dušan appears as the co-ruler in Zeta and Zahumlje. He was entitled the rule of Zeta; thus he ruled as "King of Zeta". In 1331 he succeeded his father as "King of all Serbian and Maritime Lands". In 1343 his title was "King of Serbia, Greeks, Albania and the coast". In 1345 he began calling himself tsar, Emperor, and in 1345 he proclaimed himself "Emperor of Serbs and Eastern Romans". On 16 April 1346 he was crowned Emperor of Serbs and Greeks. This title was soon enlarged into "Emperor and Autocrat of the Serbs and Greeks, the Bulgarians and Albanians".

His epithet Silni (Силни) is translated into the Mighty, but also the Great, the Powerful or the Strong.

== Legacy ==
Stefan Dušan was the most powerful Serbian ruler in the Middle Ages and remains a folk hero to Serbs. Dušan, a contemporary of England's Edward III, is regarded with the same reverence as the Bulgarians feel for Tsar Simeon I, the Poles for Sigismund I the Old, and the Czechs for Charles IV. According to Steven Runciman, he was "perhaps the most powerful ruler in Europe" during the 14th century. His state was a rival to the regional powers of Byzantium and Hungary, and it encompassed a large territory, which would also be his empire's greatest weakness. By nature a soldier and a conqueror, Dušan also proved to be very able but nonetheless feared ruler. His empire however, slowly crumbled at the hands of his son, as regional aristocrats distanced from the central rule.

The aim of restoring Serbia as an Empire it once was, was one of the greatest ideals of Serbs, living both in the Ottoman and Austro-Hungarian lands. In 1526, Jovan Nenad, in the style of Dušan, proclaimed himself Emperor, when ruling a short-lived state of Serbian provinces under the crown of Hungary.

The Realm of the Slavs, written by Ragusian historian Mavro Orbin (l. ca. 1550–1614), saw Emperor Dušan's actions and works positively. The book served as the primary source about early history of South Slavs at the time and most of the western historians drew their information on the Slavs from it. Early Serbian historians, even though they wrote according to the sources, were influenced by the ideas of the time they lived in. They made efforts to harmonize with two different traditions: one from brevets and public documents and other from genealogies and narrative writings. Of early historians, most information came from Jovan Rajić (1726–1801), who wrote fifty pages about Dušan's life. Rajić's work had great influence on Serbian culture of that time, and for decades it was the main source of information about Serbian history.

During the First Serbian Uprising, the rebels adopted the Nemanjić dynasty coat of arms and the Governing Council held sessions in 1805 in Smederevo, "the capital of our despots and emperors", below Emperor Stefan Dušan's portrait. Karađorđe's Serbia's political ambitions were based on romantic ideals in restoring the medieval Serbian state broken by the Battle of Kosovo (1389) and lost to the Ottoman Empire. Editor of Almanac Georgije Mihailović included a portrait of Karađorđe in a 1808 issue. A baroque portrait of Emperor Stefan Dušan was distributed in the Military Frontier and Serbia.

After the restoration of Serbia in the 19th century, continuity with the Serbian Middle Ages was accentuated, particularly of its greatest moment – during Emperor Dušan. A political agenda, as with a restoration of his Empire, would find its place in the political programmes of the Principality of Serbia, notably the Načertanije by Ilija Garašanin.

== Family ==
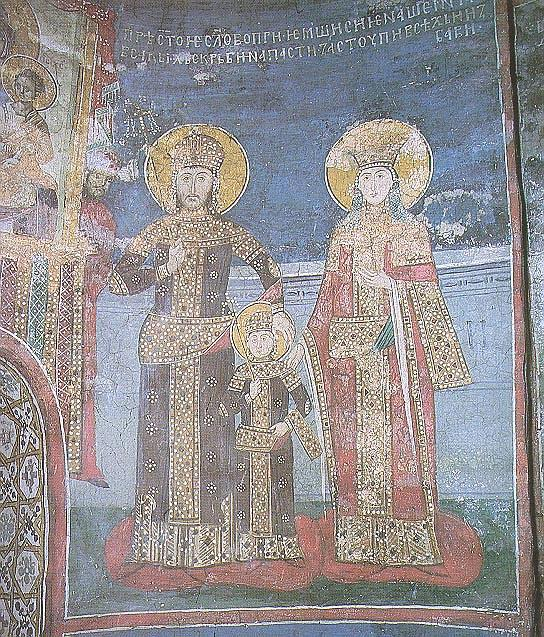
Fresco of Dušan, his wife Helena, and their son Uroš

By his wife, Helena of Bulgaria, Emperor Dušan had at least a son, Stefan Uroš V, who succeeded his father as Emperor, r. 1355–1371. Dušan and Helena also had a daughter, Theodora, who in 1351, at twelve, married the Ottoman Sultan Orhan. Theodora most likely died between 1352 and 1354.

According to Nicephorus Gregoras, Dušan was negotiating a potential alliance with Orhan, which would have involved marrying off his daughter to Orhan himself or one of Orhan's sons in 1351 with the aim of signing a truce between their kingdoms. However, after the Serbian emissaries were attacked by Nikephoros Orsini Serbia and the Ottoman Empire resumed hostilities.

Some historians speculate that the couple had another child, a daughter. J. Fine suggested that it might be "Irina" or "Irene", the wife of caesar Preljub (governor of Thessaly, d. 1355–1356), mother of Thomas Preljubović (Ruler of Epirus, 1367–1384). In one theory, she married Radoslav Hlapen, Governor of Voden and Veria and Lord of Kastoria, after her first husband's death in 1360. This hypothesis is not widely accepted.

== Foundations ==
- Saint Archangels Monastery
- Podlastva monastery
- Duljevo monastery
- A monumental church (27x14m) found near Aranđelovac in 2020

Reconstructions:

- Visoki Dečani

== In fiction ==
- Epic folk song "Ženidba Cara Dušana" ("Emperor Dušan's wedding").
- 1875 historical three-tome novel "Car Dušan" ("Emperor Dušan") by Dr Vladan Đorđević.
- 1987 historical novel "Stefan Dušan" by Slavomir Nastasijević.
- 2002 historical novel "Dušan Silni" ("Dušan the Great") by Mile Kordić.

== See also ==
- Serbian Patriarchate of Peć
- Serbian Despotate
- Danilo's anonymous pupil

== Sources ==
- Bataković, Dušan T. (2006). "A Balkan-Style French Revolution? The 1804 Serbian Uprising in European Perspective". Balcanica (36): 113–128. doi:10.2298/BALC0536113B.
- Bubalo, Đorđe (2014). Pragmatic Literacy in Medieval Serbia. Turnhout: Brepols. ISBN 978-2-503-54961-3.
- Ćirković, Sima (2004). The Serbs. Malden: Blackwell Publishing. ISBN 9781405142915.
- Dvornik, Francis (1962). The Slavs in European History and Civilization. Rutgers University Press.
- Fine, John Van Antwerp Jr. (1994) [1987]. The Late Medieval Balkans: A Critical Survey from the Late Twelfth Century to the Ottoman Conquest. Ann Arbor, Michigan: University of Michigan Press. ISBN 0472082604.
- Gavrilović, Zaga (2001). Studies in Byzantine and Serbian Medieval Art. The Pindar Press. ISBN 978-1899828340.
- Hupchick, Dennis P. (1995). Conflict and chaos in Eastern Europe. Palgrave Macmillan. ISBN 978-0-312-12116-7.
- Isailović, Neven (2016). "Living by the Border: South Slavic Marcher Lords in the Late Medieval Balkans (13th–15th Centuries)" (PDF). Banatica. 26 (2): 105–117. Archived from the original (PDF) on 8 May 2025.
- Ivanović, Miloš; Isailović, Neven (2015). "The Danube in Serbian-Hungarian Relations in the 14th and 15th Centuries" (PDF). Tibiscvm: Istorie–Arheologie. 5: 377–393. Archived from the original (PDF) on 1 August 2024.
- Ivanović, Miloš (2019). "Serbian hagiographies on the warfare and political struggles of the Nemanjić dynasty (from the twelfth to the fourteenth century)" (PDF). Reform and Renewal in Medieval East and Central Europe: Politics, Law and Society. Cluj-Napoca: Romanian Academy, Center for Transylvanian Studies. pp. 103–129.
- Joksić, Ivan (2022). "State-legal foundation of Medieval Serbia in the provisions of Dušan's code" (PDF). Pravo: Teorija I Praksa. 39 (4): 59–76. doi:10.5937/ptp2204059J. Archived from the original (PDF) on 30 January 2023.
- Kazhdan, Alexander, ed. (1991), Oxford Dictionary of Byzantium, Oxford University Press, ISBN 978-0-19-504652-6
- Nicol, Donald M. (1993) [1972]. The Last Centuries of Byzantium, 1261–1453. Cambridge: Cambridge University Press. ISBN 9780521439916.
- Nicol, Donald M. (1996). The Reluctant Emperor: A Biography of John Cantacuzene, Byzantine Emperor and Monk, c. 1295–1383. Cambridge University Press. ISBN 978-0521522014.
- Ostrogorsky, George (1956). History of the Byzantine State. Basil Blackwell.
- Popović, Tatyana (1988). Prince Marko: The Hero of South Slavic Epics. Syracuse University Press. ISBN 978-0815624448.
- Ryder, Judith (2010). The Career and Writings of Demetrius Kydones A Study of Fourteenth-Century Byzantine Politics, Religion and Society. Brill. ISBN 978-9004185654.
- Sedlar, Jean W. (1994). East Central Europe in the Middle Ages, 1000–1500. University of Washington Press. ISBN 978-0295800646.
- Soulis, George Christos (1984). The Serbs and Byzantium during the reign of Tsar Stephen Dušan (1331–1355) and his successors. Dumbarton Oaks Library and Collection. ISBN 978-0884021377.
- Uzelac, Aleksandar B. (2015). "Foreign Soldiers in the Nemanjić State – A Critical Overview" (PDF). Belgrade Historical Review. 6: 69–89. Archived from the original (PDF) on 13 May 2025.
- Vizantološki institut, Zbornik radova Vizantološkog instituta, (Naučno delo, 1996), 194.
- Clissold, Stephen (1968). A short history of Yugoslavia: from early times to 1966. Cambridge University Press. ISBN 978-0521095310.
- Harris, Jonathan, The End of Byzantium. New Haven and London: Yale University Press, 2010. ISBN 978-0-300-11786-8
- Pirivatrić Srđan, Entering of Stefan Dušan into the Empire, Zbornik radova Vizantološkog instituta 2007, Issue 44, pp: 381–409, doi:10.2298/ZRVI0744381P
- Ječmenica, Dejan (2012). "Stefan Dušan I Dubrovnik". Универзитет У Београду. doi:10.2298/bg20130213jecmenica. hdl:21.15107/rcub_nardus_3216. (in Serbian)

Stefan Dušan Nemanjić dynasty Born: 1308 Died: 20 December 1355
Regnal titles
| New title | Emperor of Serbia; 16 April 1346 – 20 December 1355 | Succeeded by Stefan Uroš V |
| Preceded by Stefan Dečanski | King of Serbia; 8 September 1331 – 16 April 1346 | Succeeded by Stefan Uroš V |
