= Marko Murat =

Serbian artist (1864–1944)

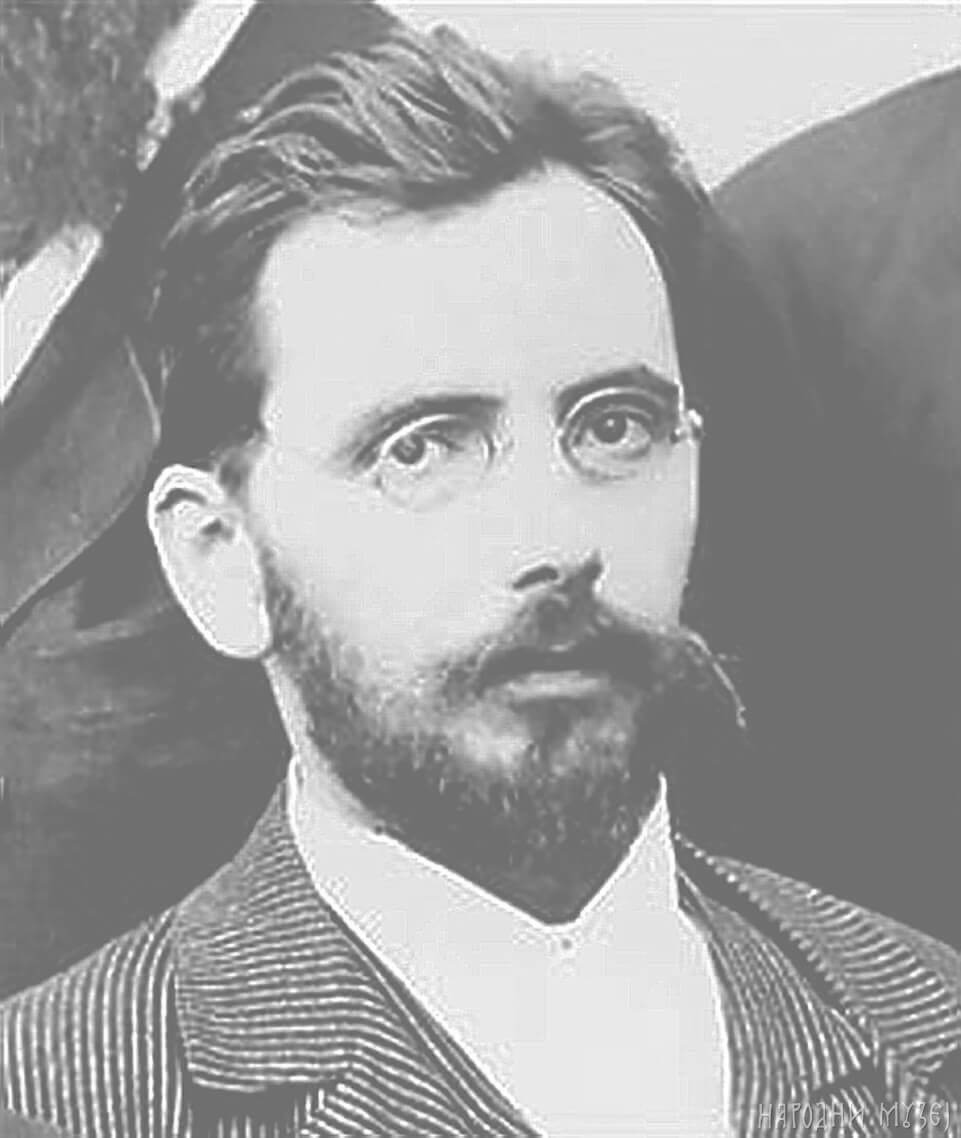
- Born: Marko Murat; 30 December 1864; Šipanska Luka near Dubrovnik, Kingdom of Dalmatia, Austrian Empire
- Died: 14 October 1944 (aged 79); Dubrovnik, FS Croatia, DF Yugoslavia
- Known for: Painter

Marko Murat (Serbian Cyrillic: Марко Мурат; December 30, 1864 – October 14, 1944) was a Serbian painter from Dubrovnik who spent 20 years of his life in Belgrade, becoming a leading member of the Serbian and Yugoslav art scene at the time, before returning to his home town where he made a substantial mark in art conservation.

== Life and work ==
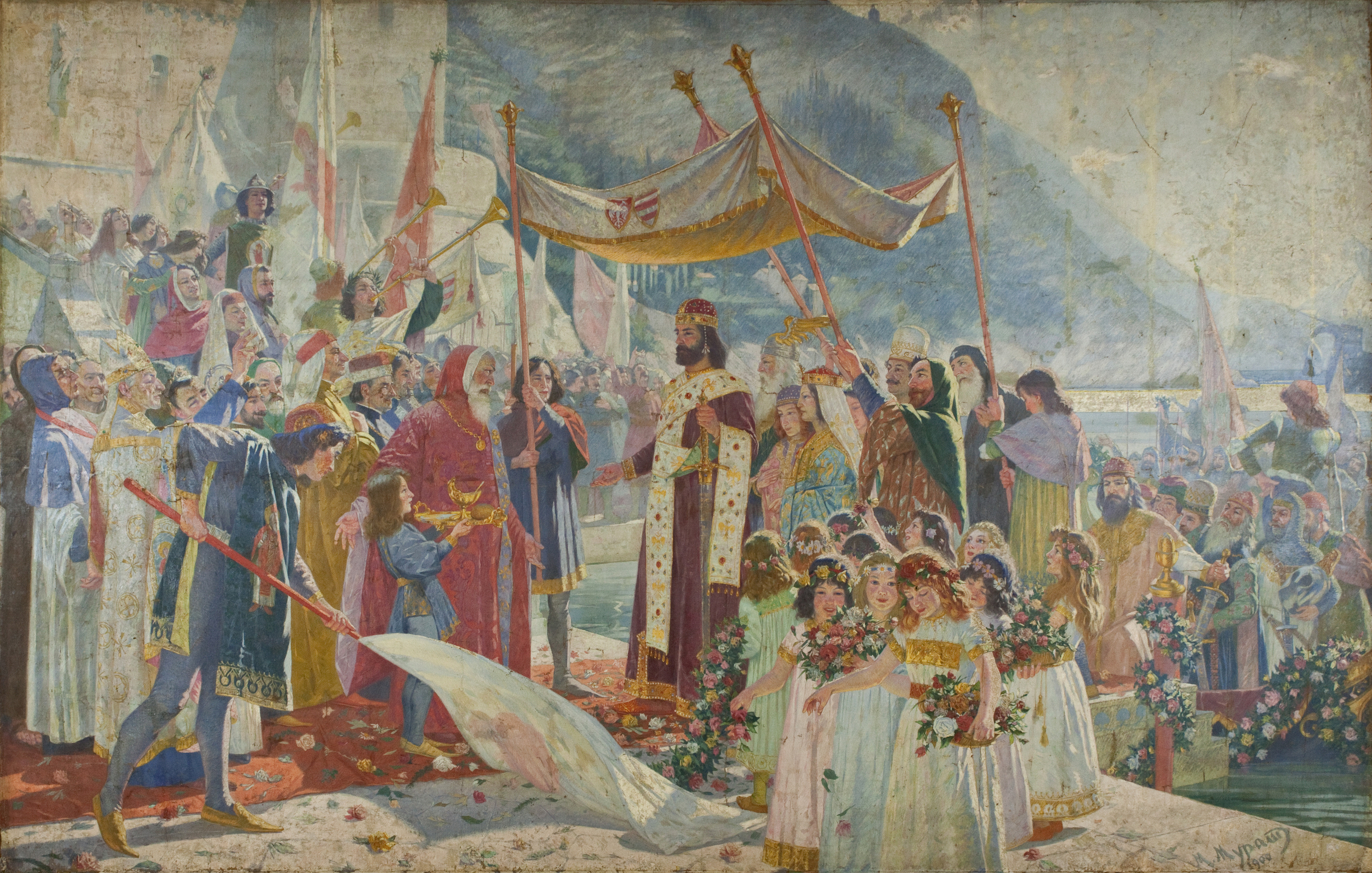
Dušan the Mighty entering in Dubrovnik, 1899

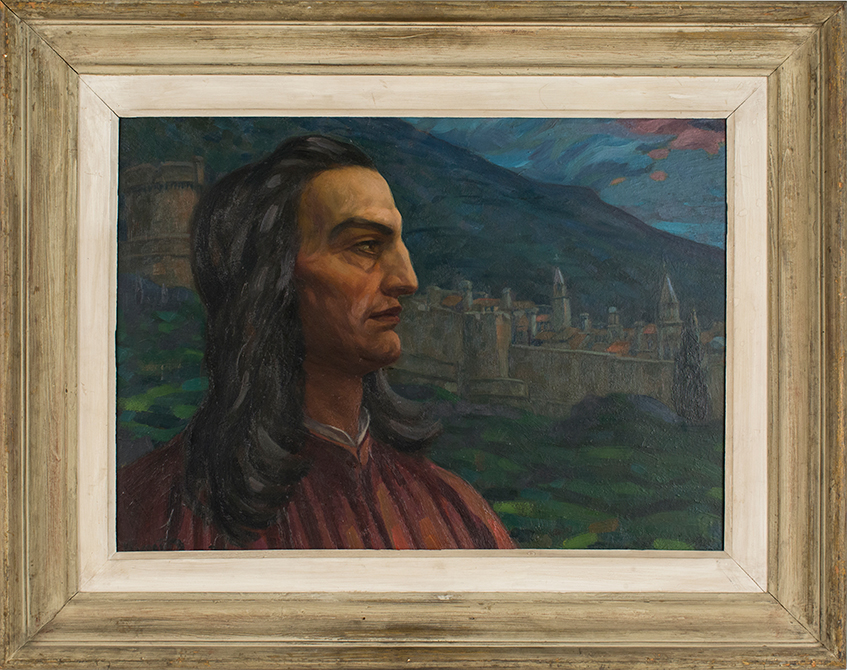
Dživo Gundulić, the National Museum of Pančevo

Murat was born in Šipanska Luka near Dubrovnik in a Catholic family, as his uncle Vice Palunko was a noted priest and assistant bishop, and his older brother Andro Murat also became a priest. After finishing primary school in Dubrovnik in 1883, Marko Murat attended the seminary in Zadar. In 1886, he submitted a drawing to Vijenac which was noticed by Baron Ludwig Lujo Vranyczany (1840–1922), who financed a scholarship for him to study at the Munich Art Academy. After graduation in 1893, he went to Rome and Paris.

In 1894 he moved to Belgrade, where he finally settled in 1898, employed at the Second Belgrade Gymnasium. In the year 1900, Marko Murat was a representative of Serbia at the 1900 World's Fair in Paris, where he won the bronze card for his artwork The Arrival of Tzar Dushan of Serbia to Dubrovnik. In 1905 he was one of the founders of the Art&Craft school, the predecessors to the Academy of Fine Arts, Belgrade. Between 1904 and 1906, he was also a drawing teacher of Royal Prince Aleksandar Karađorđević of Serbia. His works were also exhibited at the 1911 World's Fair in Rome.

Murat was a proponent of Yugoslavism who wrote in his autobiography about Serb and Croat tribes of the Yugoslav nation.

He exhibited his artworks as a part of Kingdom of Serbia's pavilion at International Exhibition of Art of 1911.

At the outbreak of World War I, he was in Dubrovnik, where Austrian authorities arrested him and held him in Hungary until May 1916. After the war, Marko Murat had a major role as an art conservator in Dubrovnik, from 1919 to 1932.

In 1920 he became an honorary member of Serbian Academy of Sciences and Arts, and from 1940 he was a regular member.

In a personal correspondence with author and critic dr. Milan Šević in 1932, Murat complained that Orthodox Serbs are not acknowledging the Catholic Serb community on the basis of their faith.

Marko Murat was one of the first impressionists in the South Slavic region. Landscapes, portraits and historical compositions were his trademark. His works were displayed at almost every relevant exhibition in Yugoslavia and abroad, in Sofia, Munich, Paris, Rome, Vienna and London.

He died in Dubrovnik. The manuscript of his unfinished autobiography was lost after his death and found only recently; it presents a rare description of everyday life in Dubrovnik in the 1860s and 1870s. It was published in 2007 in the Croatian literary magazine Kolo.
