= Battle of Stephaniana =

1344 battle in the Balkans

- Part of the Byzantine civil war of 1341–1347
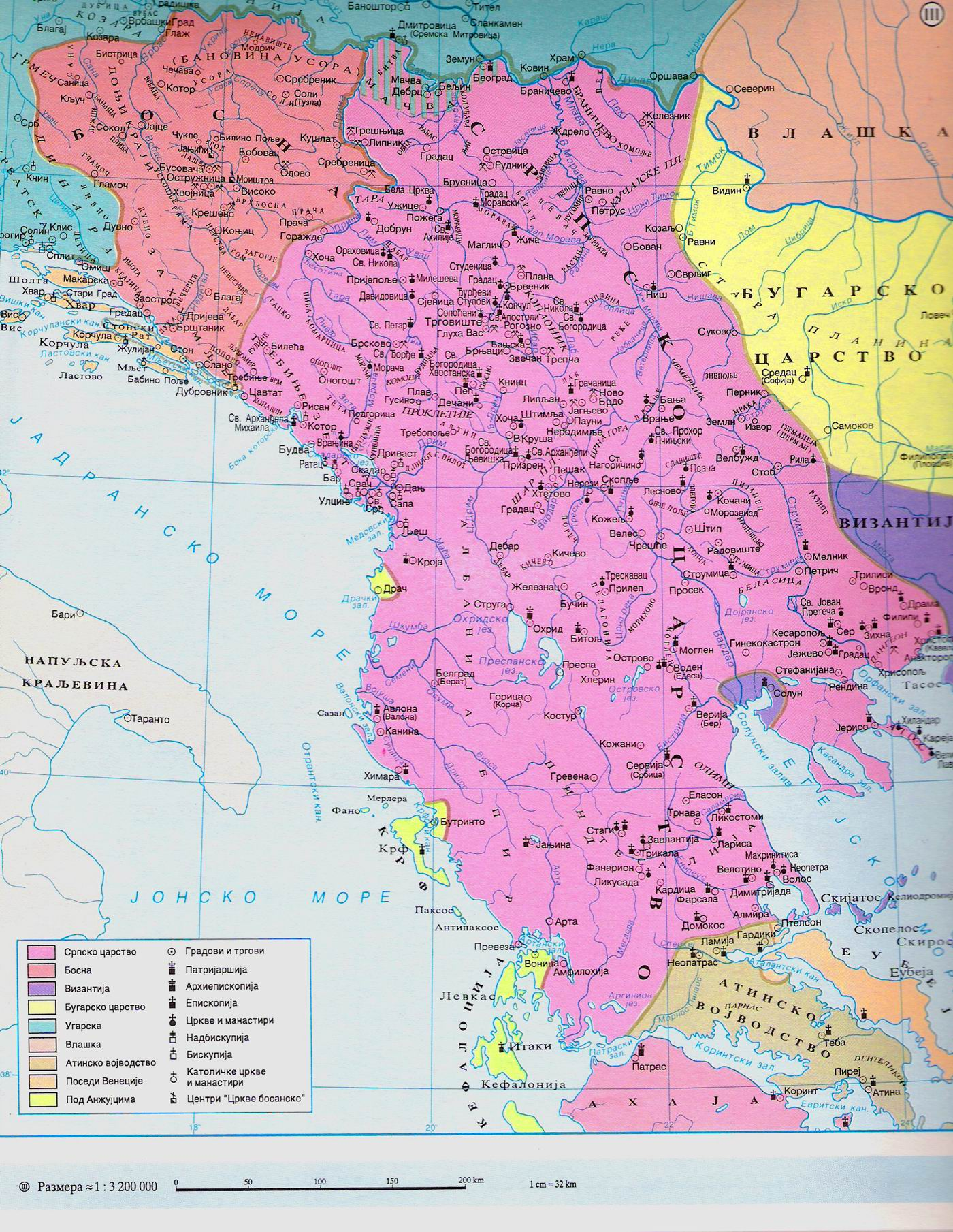
- Map of the Serbian Empire, University of Belgrade, 1922.
Date	May 1344
Location	Macedonia, near the Aegean shore
Result	Turkish victory

Belligerents
Beylik of Aydin	Medieval Kingdom of Serbia

Commanders and leaders
Umur Beg	voivode Gregor Preljub

Strength
3,100	Unknown

The Battle of Stephaniana (Serbian: Битка код Стефанијане) was a small-scale battle between the forces of the Medieval Serbian Kingdom and the Emirate of Aydin, allies of Byzantine emperor John VI Kantakouzenos. It was the first battle between the Serbs and Turks, as an earlier battle in Gallipoli was fought between troops sent by King Milutin and Turcopole Halil Pasha (1312).

The Aydin force, 3,100 strong, were in the process of returning to Anatolia to defend against a Latin attack on their main harbour, Smyrna. On their way they were attacked by a Serbian army under voivode Preljub, one of the most capable generals in the service of Stefan Dušan. The battle, which occurred sometime in May 1344, was won by the Turks, but was not able to thwart the ongoing conquest of Byzantine Macedonia by Dušan.

== Background ==
Both the Serbs and Bulgarians who had existing kingdoms in the Balkans and various groups of Turks were by 1344 very active in the Byzantine Civil War (1341–47).

== See also ==
- History of the Serbian-Turkish wars

== Sources ==
- Fine, John Van Antwerp (1994), The Late Medieval Balkans: A Critical Survey from the Late Twelfth Century to the Ottoman Conquest, University of Michigan Press, ISBN 978-0-472-08260-5
- Kyriakidis, Savvas (2018). "Warfare in the Histories of John Kantakouzenos". In Yıldız, Aysel; Theotokis, Georgios (eds.). A Military History of the Mediterranean Sea: Aspects of War, Diplomacy, and Military Elites. Brill. pp. 299–324.
- Soulis, George Christos (1984), The Serbs and Byzantium during the reign of Tsar Stephen Dušan (1331–1355) and his successors, Dumbarton Oaks, ISBN 0-88402-137-8
