= Preljub =

Serbian magnate

- Preljub
- Born: c. 1312
- Died: 1355/1356
- Relatives: Thomas II Preljubović
- Military career
- Allegiance: Kingdom of Serbia; Serbian Empire
- Rank: Voivode; Caesar

Preljub (Serbian Cyrillic: Прељуб; c. 1312–1356) was a Serbian magnate who served Emperor Stefan Dušan (r. 1331–55) as vojvoda (general). He participated in the southern conquests and held Thessaly with the rank of caesar (kesar) in 1348–56. His son Thomas Preljubović was Despot of Epirus in 1366–84.

== Biography ==
Preljub appears in sources in 1344, taking part in the Serbian conquest of Macedonia during the Byzantine civil war of 1341–1347. According to contemporary chroniclers, Stefan Dušan considered him the best of all his magnates "in valor, courage and experience".

In May 1344, he fought in the Battle of Stephaniana against the Emirate of Aydin, allies of the Byzantine emperor John VI Kantakouzenos. The battle was a defeat, but it did not seriously affect the progress of the Serbian conquest.

In 1348, reinforced with numerous Albanian auxiliary troops, Preljub invaded Thessaly. Aided by the depopulation brought about by the Black Death, which, among others, had killed the local Byzantine governor, John Angelos, he wrested most of the region from the Byzantines and the Catalans of the Duchy of Neopatria by November of the same year. Dušan named him governor of Thessaly, with Trikala as his seat, and gave him the title of caesar as a reward. Several earlier scholars have stated that Preljub also controlled parts of Epirus, including the city of Ioannina, but recent research regards this as unlikely, and most likely the result of additions or mistakes in later sources.

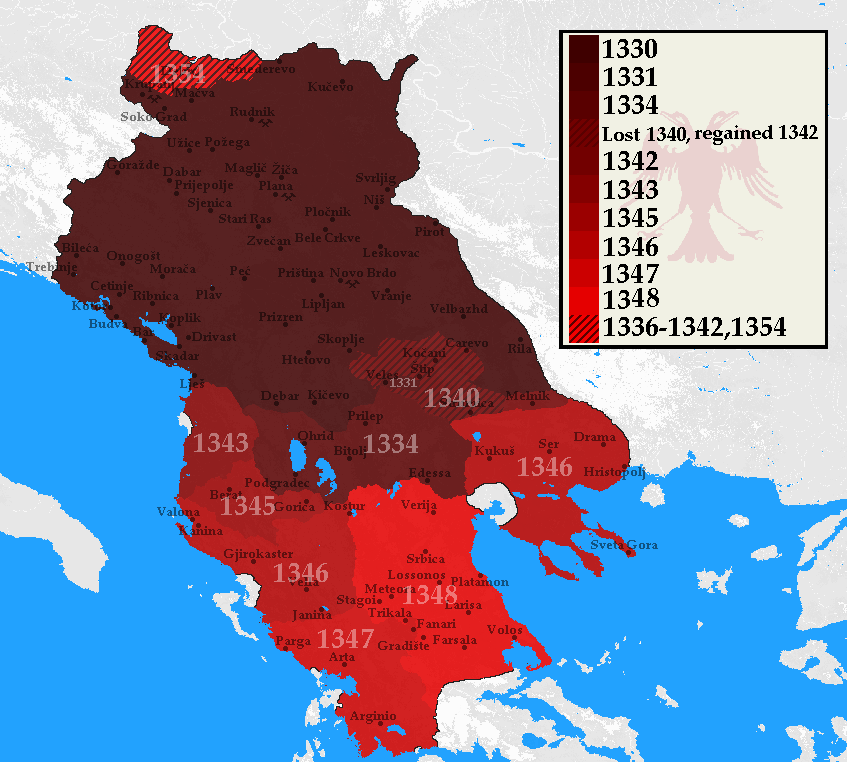
Conquests of Serbia under Stefan Dušan

In 1350, John VI Kantakouzenos took advantage of Dušan's absence in a campaign against Bosnia, and attempted to recover his lost provinces in Macedonia and Thessaly. He landed at Thessalonica and succeeded in regaining several key fortresses in Macedonia, but his advance towards Thessaly was stopped by Preljub, who, with 500 men, held the strategically important fortress of Servia against him. Kantakouzenos, whose army was insufficient to overpower the town's defenses, withdrew, and Dušan was able to recover his lost fortresses with ease.

Preljub died in late 1355, or early 1356, shortly after Dušan himself, in a clash with local Albanian clans. His widow, Irina Nemanjić, a daughter of Dušan, and their son Thomas, soon faced an invasion by Nikephoros Orsini, the former Despot of Epirus. Orsini managed to rally the Greek inhabitants of the province to his side, forcing Irina to return to Serbia. In 1357, she married Radoslav Hlapen, the governor of much of western Macedonia, including Vodena and Berrhoea. In 1366/67, Thomas became ruler of the Despotate of Epirus at Ioannina.

== Annotations ==
1. In Greek sources he was known as Grēgorios Prealimbos (Γρηγόριος Πρεάλιμπος) or Preloumbos (Πρελούμπος)

== Sources ==
- Ferjančić, Božidar (1974). Тесалија у XIII и XIV веку [Thessaly in the 13th and 14th Centuries] (in Serbian). Belgrade: Византолошког институт САНУ.
- Fine, John V. A. (1994) [1987]. The Late Medieval Balkans: A Critical Survey from the Late Twelfth Century to the Ottoman Conquest. Ann Arbor, Michigan: University of Michigan Press. ISBN 978-0-472-10079-8.
- Soulis, George Christos (1984). The Serbs and Byzantium during the Reign of Tsar Stephen Dušan (1331–1355) and his Successors. Washington, District of Columbia: Dumbarton Oaks. ISBN 0-88402-137-8.

Preceded by John Angelos as Byzantine governor	Ruler of Thessaly as Serbian governor 1348–56	Succeeded by Nikephoros Orsini as Byzantine governor
