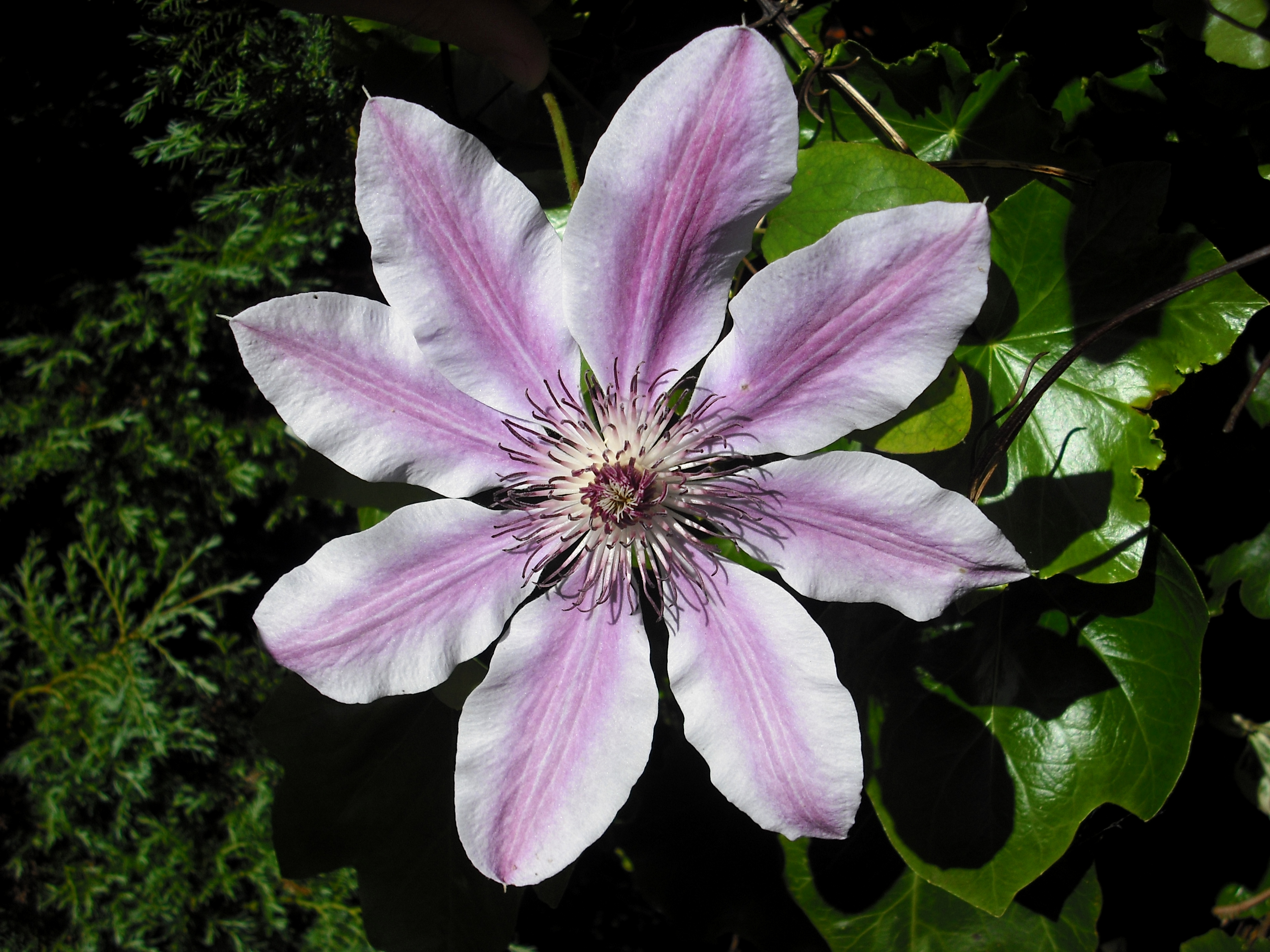
- Clematis 'Nelly Moser'

Scientific classification
- Kingdom: Plantae
- Clade: Tracheophytes
- Clade: Angiosperms
- Clade: Eudicots
- Order: Ranunculales
- Family: Ranunculaceae
- Subfamily: Ranunculoideae
- Tribe: Anemoneae
- Genus: Clematis; L.

Species
- List of Clematis species

Synonyms
- Atragene L. Coriflora Weber; Viorna Rchb.

= Clematis =

Genus of plants in the buttercup family

Clematis is a genus of about 380 species within the buttercup family, Ranunculaceae. Their garden hybrids and cultivars have been popular among gardeners, beginning with Clematis 'Jackmanii', a garden staple since 1862. More cultivars are being produced constantly, mainly of Chinese and Japanese origin.

== Species names ==
Most species are known as clematis in English, while some are also known as:

- traveller's joy, a name invented for the sole British native, C. vitalba, by the herbalist John Gerard (1545–1612);
- virgin's bower for C. terniflora, C. virginiana, and C. viticella;
- old man's beard, applied to several with prominent seedheads;
- leather flower for those with fleshy petals; or vase vine for the North American Clematis viorna.

== Etymology ==
The genus name Clematis (Note: The Classical pronunciation of clematis is /ˈklɛmətɪs/. Other attested pronunciations include /kləˈmætɪs/ and, particularly in the UK, /kləˈmeɪtɪs/.) is from Ancient Greek κληματίς : clēmatís, ("a climbing plant") from κλήμα : klḗma – 'twig, sprout, tendril'.

== Botany ==
The genus is composed of mostly vigorous, woody, climbing vines / lianas. The woody stems are quite fragile until several years old. Leaves are opposite and divided into leaflets and leafstalks that twist and curl around supporting structures to anchor the plant as it climbs. Some species are shrubby, while others, like C. recta, are herbaceous perennial plants. The cool temperate species are deciduous, but many of the warmer climate species are evergreen. They grow best in cool, moist, well-drained soil in full sun.

Clematis species are mainly found throughout the temperate regions of the Northern Hemisphere, rarely in the tropics. Clematis leaves are food for the caterpillars of some Lepidoptera species, including the willow beauty (Peribatodes rhomboidaria).

The timing and location of flowers varies; spring-blooming clematis flower on side shoots of the previous year's stems, summer/fall blooming clematis bloom only on the ends of new stems, and twice-flowering clematis do both.

== Taxonomy ==
The genus Clematis was first published by Carl Linnaeus in Species Plantarum in 1753, the first species listed being Clematis viticella. The genus name long pre-dates Linnaeus. It was used in Classical Greek for various climbing plants, and is based on κλήμα (klēma), meaning vine or tendril.

=== Archiclematis and Naravelia ===
Some morphologically distinctive taxa lacking the combination of characters defining Clematis were formerly segregated as the genera Archiclematis (1 species) and Naravelia (several species). DNA sequence studies have found that these two genera are deeply nested in Clematis, the morphological characters they were erected on being either reversals or misinterpretations, and that consequently the genera should be reduced to the synonymy of Clematis. Naravelia is a monophyletic group within Clematis.

Species to be transferred include:

- Clematis alternata syn. Archiclematis alternata
- Clematis antonii, syn. Naravelia antonii
- Clematis dasyoneura, syn. Naravelia dasyoneura
- Clematis horripilata, syn. Naravelia laurifolia
- Clematis zeylanica, syn. Naravelia zeylanica

=== Species ===
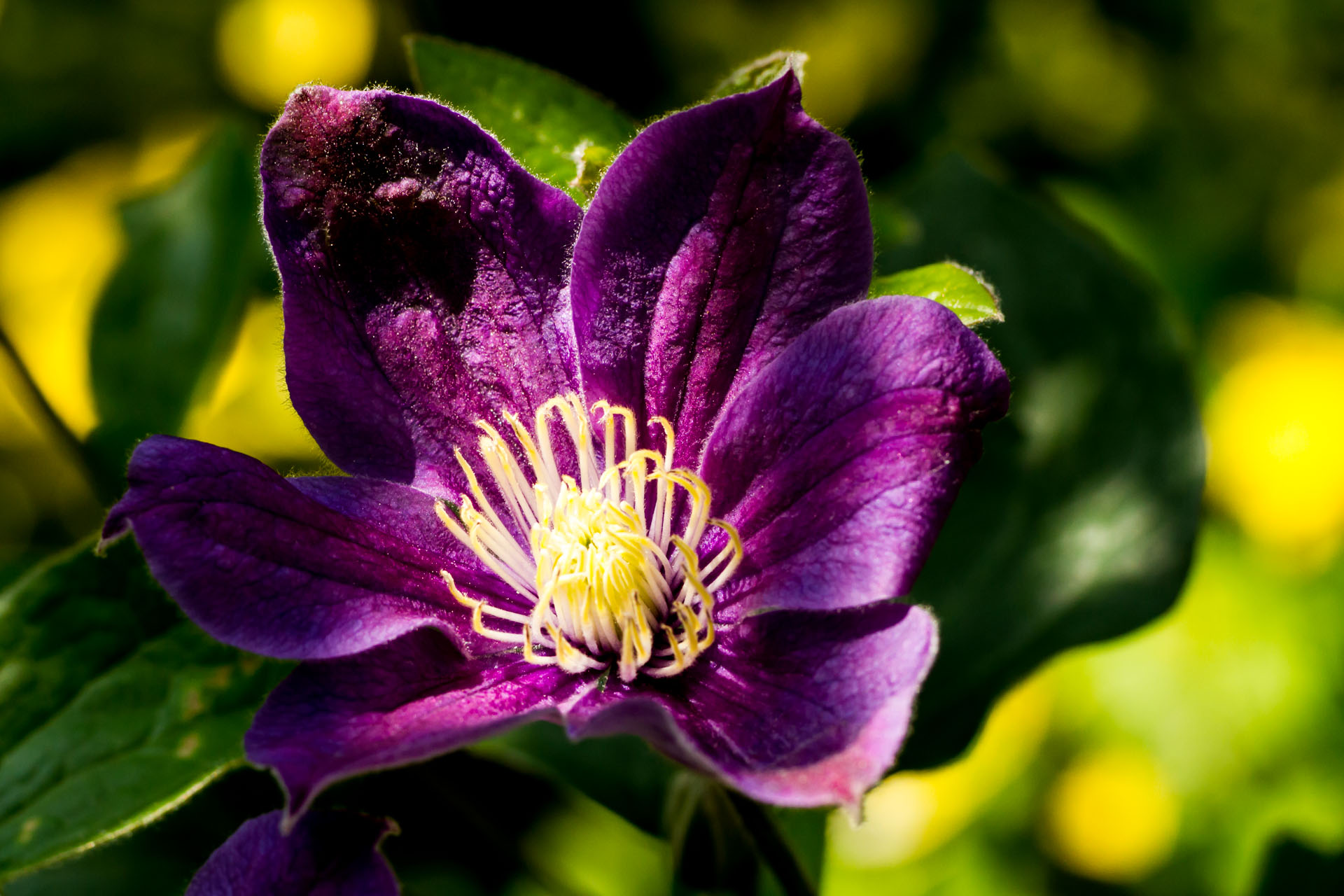
Large, dark purple clematis flower with white finger stamens in sunlight

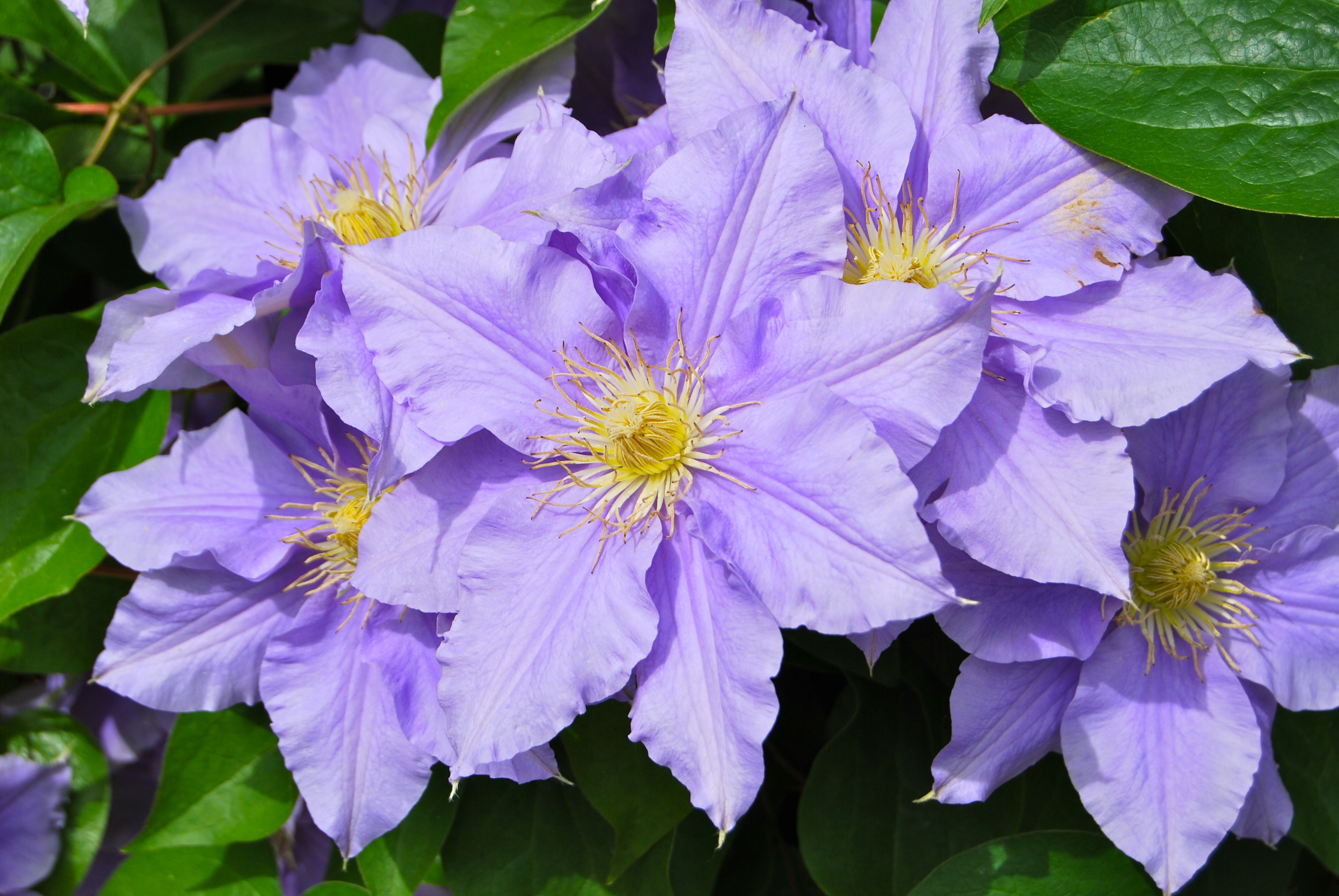
Purple clematis

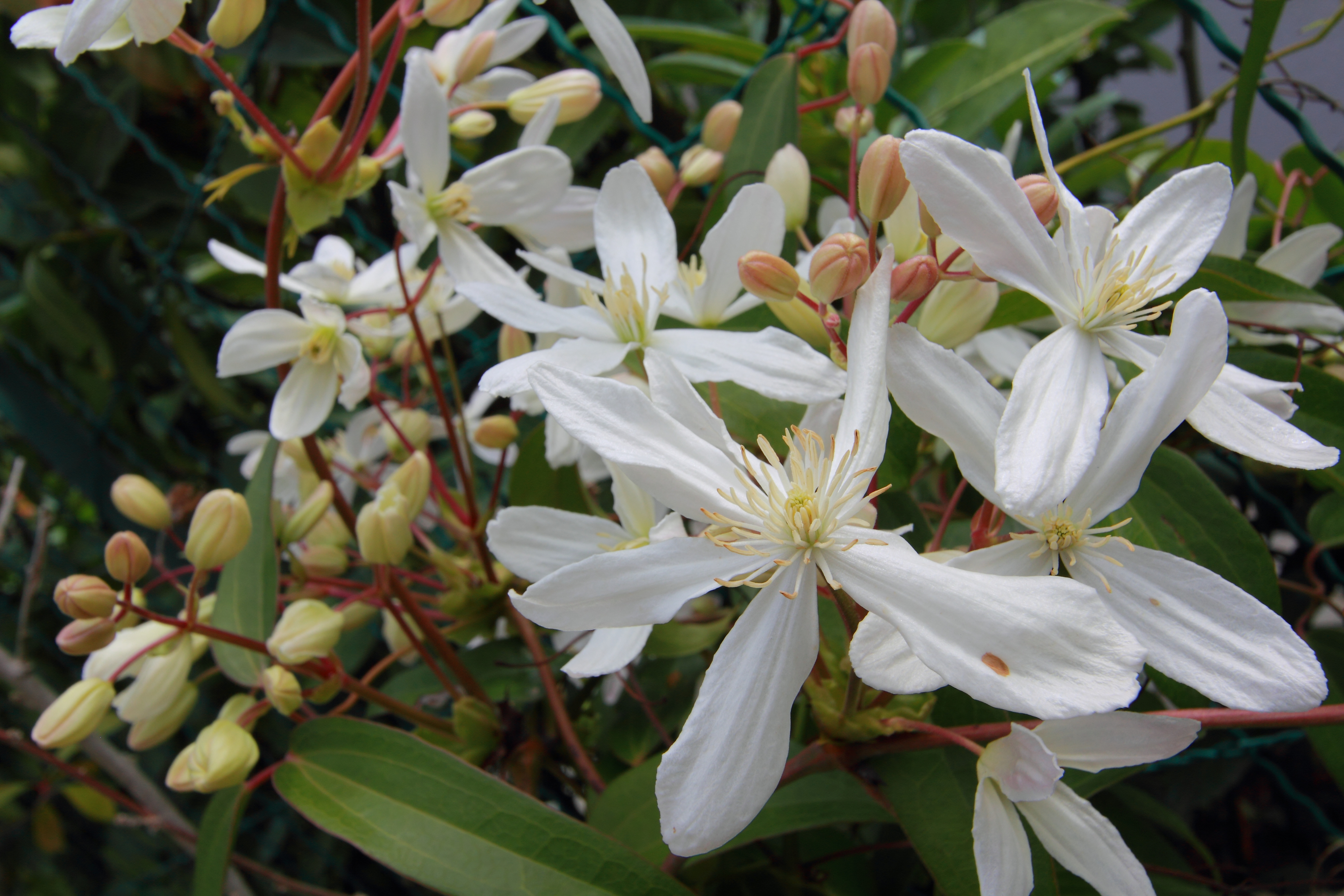
Clematis armandii

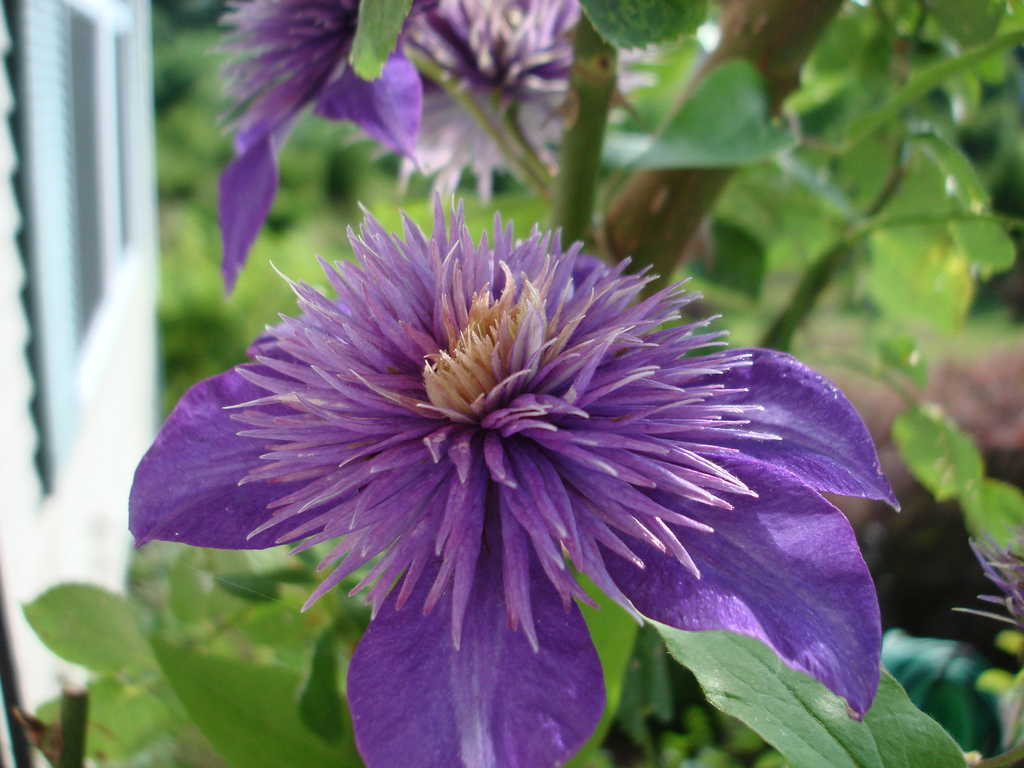
Clematis 'Multi Blue'

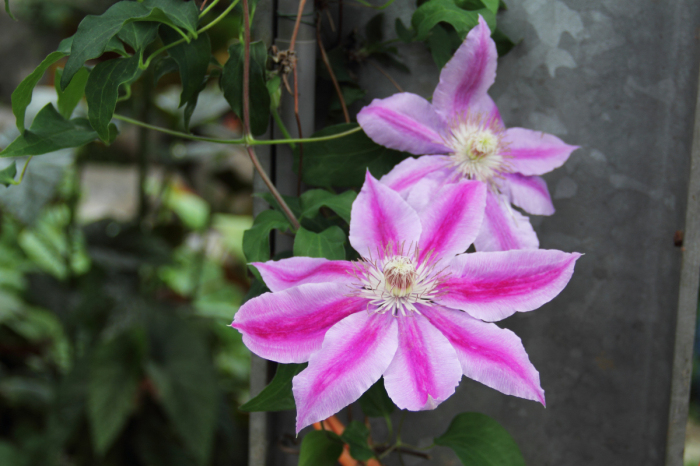
Clematis florida

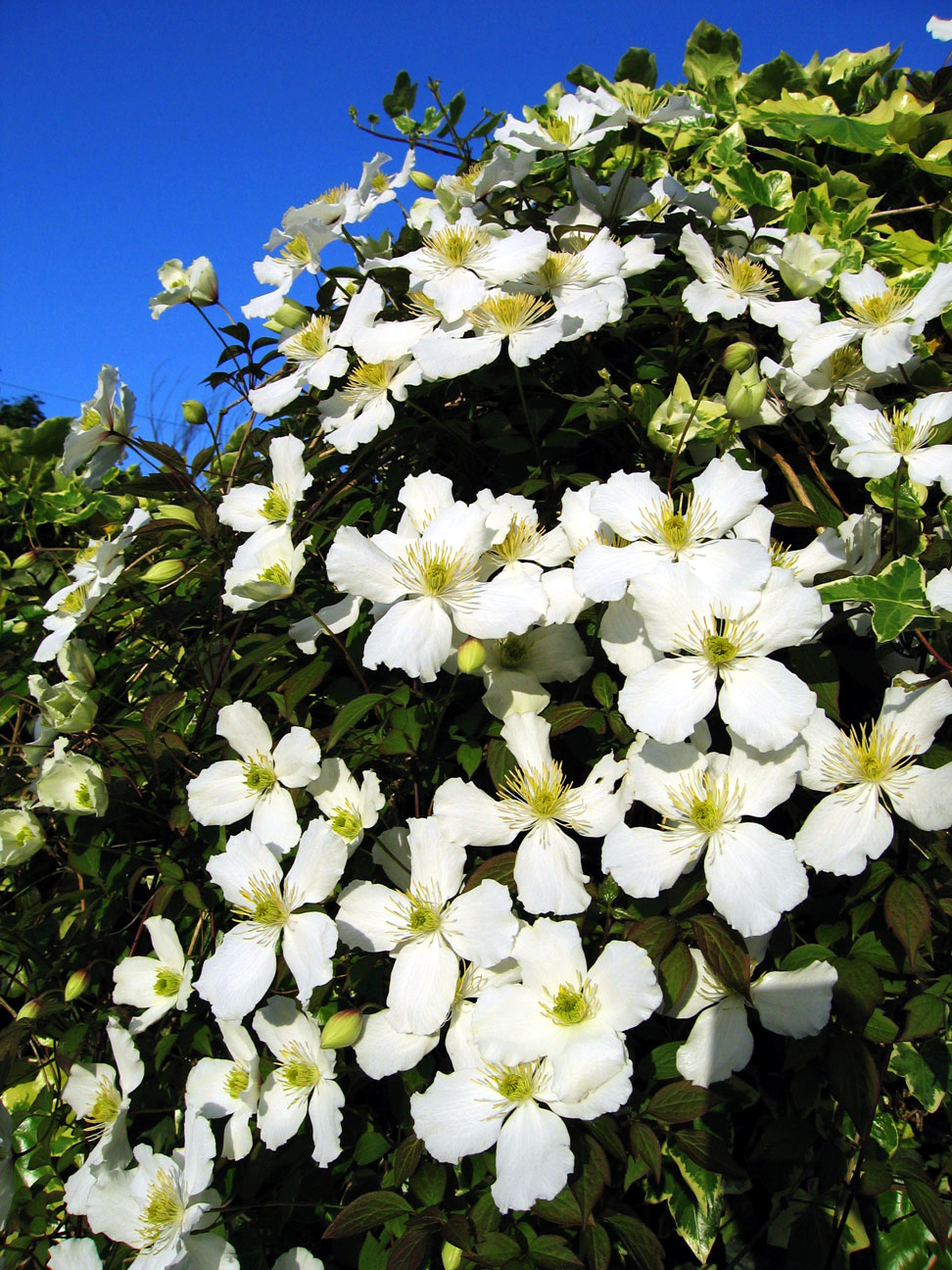
C. montana

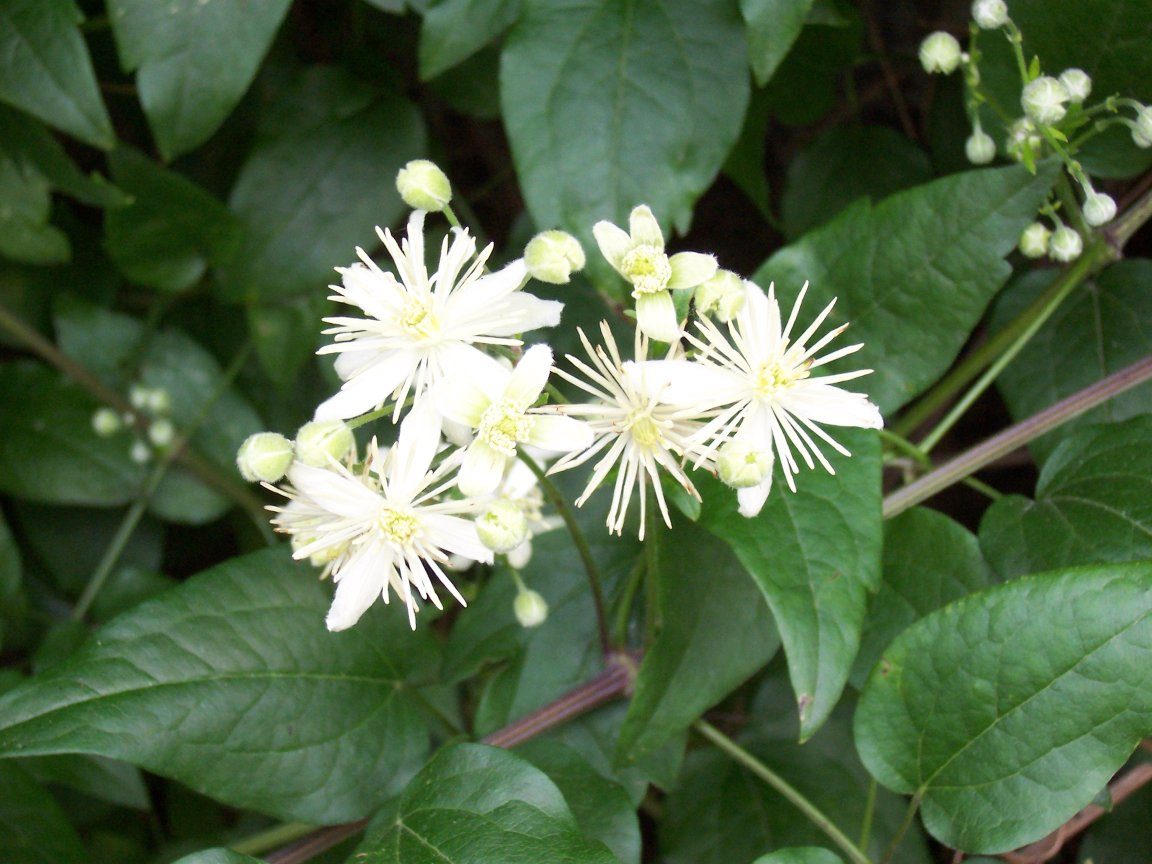
Flowers of C. vitalba

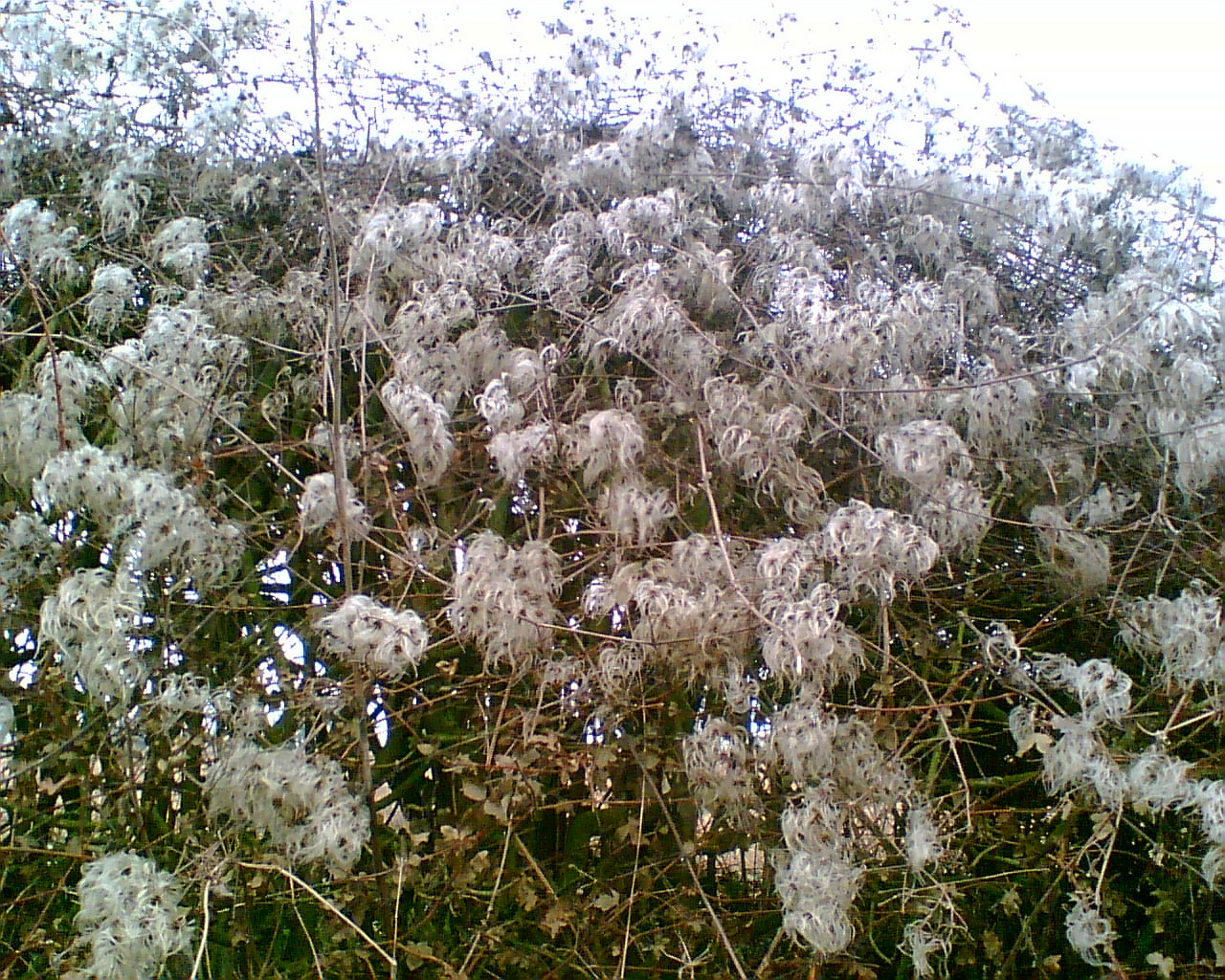
Seed heads of C. vitalba growing in a hedge, showing why it is known colloquially as "old man's beard"

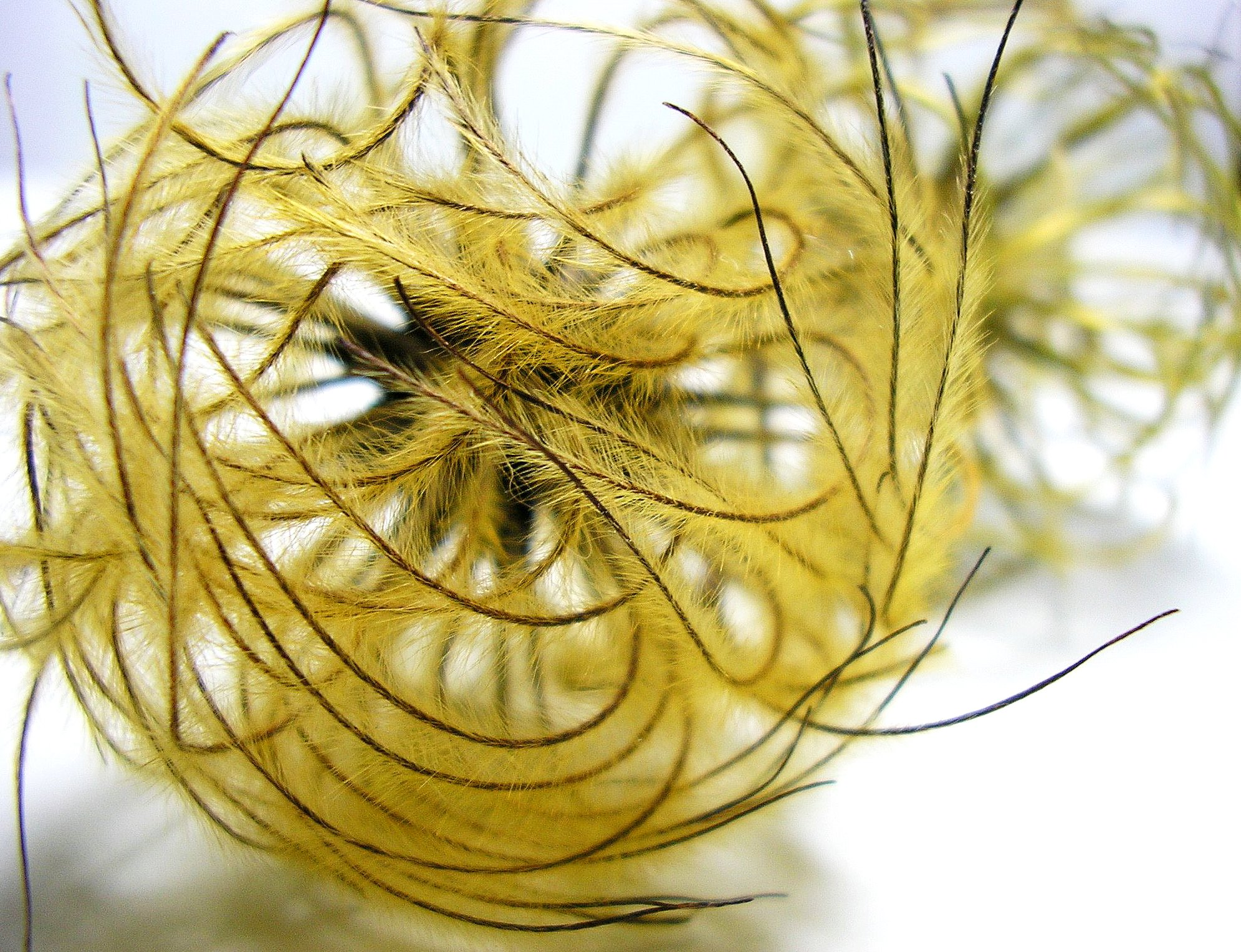
Achenes

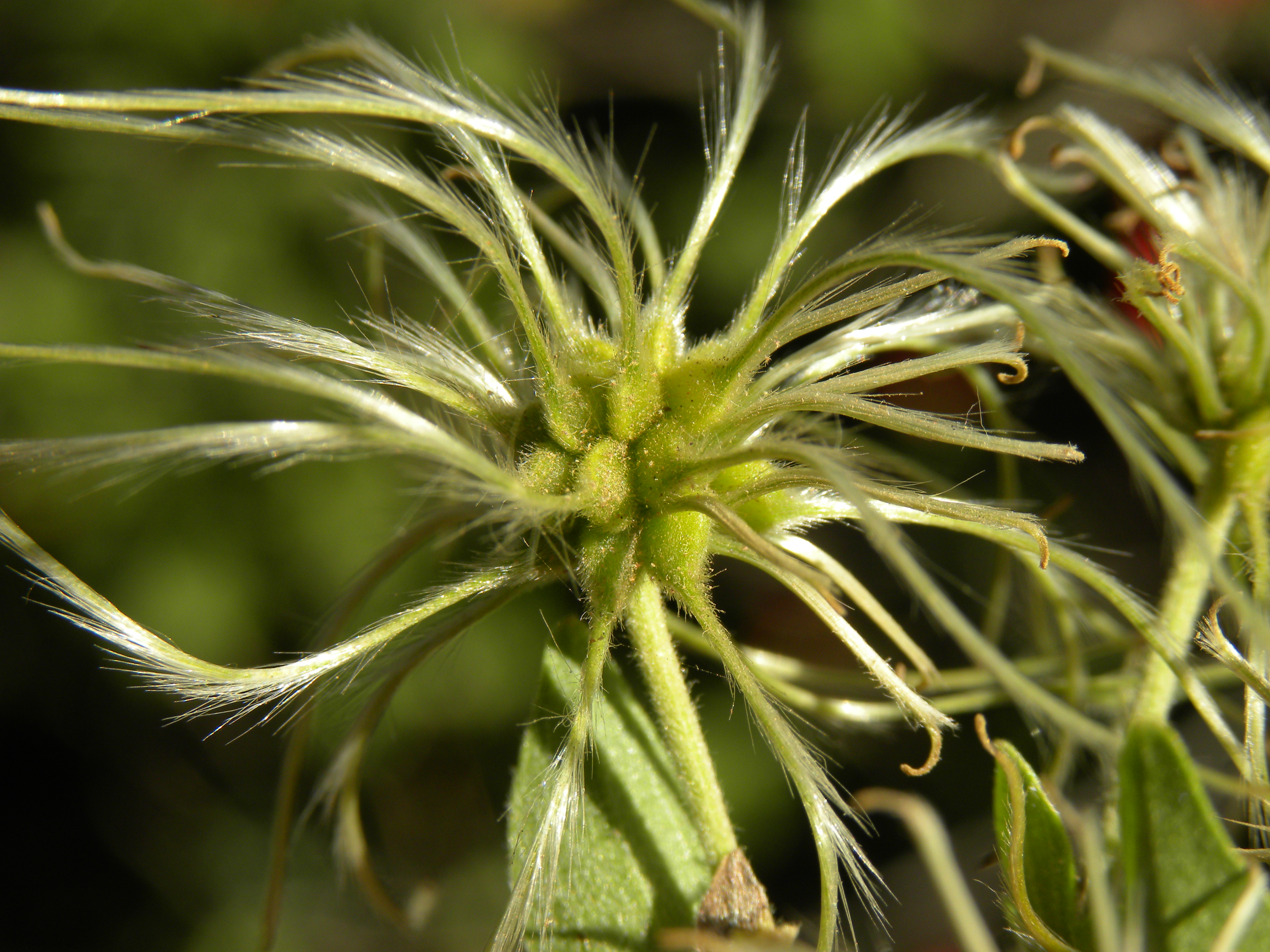
Fruits of C. dioica in Guanacaste, Costa Rica

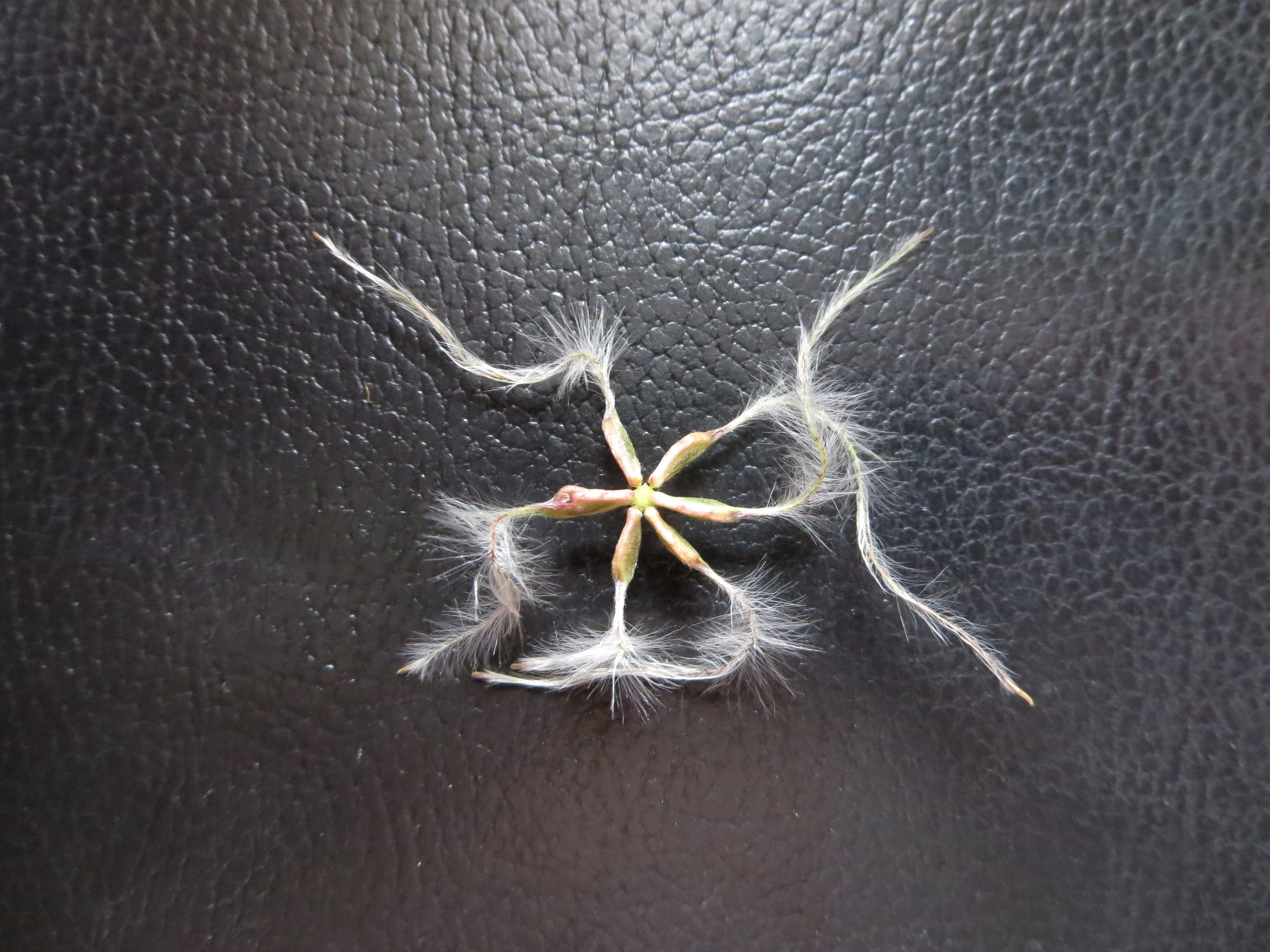
C. terniflora seed cluster

A partial list of species:

- Clematis addisonii Britt. – Addison's leather flower
- Clematis akebioides (Maxim.) H.J.Veitch
- Clematis albicoma Wherry – whitehair leather flower
- Clematis alpina (L.) Mill. – alpine clematis
- Clematis aristata R.Br. ex Ker Gawl. – Australian clematis
- Clematis armandii – Armand clematis
- Clematis baldwinii Torr. & A.Gray – pine hyacinth
- Clematis bigelovii Torr. – Bigelow clematis
- Clematis brachiata Thunb. – traveller's joy
- Clematis campaniflora Brot. – Portuguese clematis
- Clematis catesbyana – satin curls
- Clematis chinensis Osbeck – wei ling xian in Chinese (Chinese: 威靈仙; pinyin: Wei ling xian)
- Clematis chrysocoma Franch. – gold wool clematis
- Clematis cirrhosa L. – includes the 'Freckles', 'Wisley Cream', and 'Jingle Bells' cultivars
  - Clematis cirrhosa v. balearica (Balearic Islands)
- Clematis coactilis (Fern.) Keener – Virginia whitehair leather flower
- Clematis columbiana (Nutt.) Torr. & A.Gray – British Columbia virgin's bower
- Clematis crispa L. – swamp leather flower
- Clematis cunninghamii
- Clematis dioica L. – cabellos de angel
- Clematis drummondii Torr. & A.Gray – Drummond clematis
- Clematis durandii
- Clematis fawcettii F.Muell.
- Clematis flammula L. – fragrant virgin's bower
- Clematis florida Thunb. – Asian clematis
- Clematis foetida Raoul (1846) – New Zealand clematis
- Clematis fremontii S.Watson – Fremont's leather flower
- Clematis glaucophylla Small – whiteleaf leather flower
- Clematis glycinoides DC. – headache vine
- Clematis gouriana – Indian traveller's joy
- Clematis henryi Oliv.
- Clematis hirsutissima Pursh – hairy clematis
- Clematis hedysarifolia DC.
- Clematis integrifolia L.
- Clematis ispahanica Bioss
- Clematis × jackmanii T.Moore – Jackman's clematis
- Clematis koreana Kom. – Korean clematis
- Clematis lanuginosa Lindl. & Paxton
- Clematis lasiantha Nutt. – pipestem clematis
- Clematis leptophylla (F.Muell. ex Benth.) H.Eichler
- Clematis ligusticifolia Nutt. – western white clematis, hierba de chivo
- Clematis linearifolia Steud.
- Clematis macropetala Ledeb. – downy clematis
- Clematis mandshurica
- Clematis marmoraria Sneddon – New Zealand dwarf clematis
- Clematis microphylla DC. – small-leaved clematis
- Clematis montana Buch.-Ham. ex DC. – anemone clematis
- Clematis morefieldii Kral – Huntsville vasevine
- Clematis napaulensis DC.
- Clematis occidentalis (Hornem.) DC. – western blue virginsbower
- Clematis ochroleuca Ait. – curlyheads
- Clematis orientalis L. – Chinese clematis
- Clematis palmeri Rose – Palmer clematis
- Clematis paniculata J.F.Gmel. – puawhananga
- Clematis patens C.Morren & Decne.
- Clematis pauciflora Nutt. – ropevine clematis
- Clematis pickeringii A.Gray
- Clematis pitcheri Torr. & A.Gray – bluebill
- Clematis pubescens Hügel ex Endl. – common clematis
- Clematis recta L. – ground clematis
- Clematis reticulata Walter – netleaf leather flower
- Clematis rhodocarpa Rose
- Clematis smilacifolia Wall.
- Clematis socialis Kral – Alabama leather flower
- Clematis stans Siebold & Zucc. – kusabotan
- Clematis tangutica (Maxim.) Korsh. – golden clematis
- Clematis terniflora DC. – sweet autumn clematis
- Clematis texensis Buckley – scarlet leather flower
- Clematis urophylla
- Clematis versicolor – manycolored leather flower
- Clematis verticillaris – purple virgins bower
- Clematis viorna L. – vasevine, traveller's joy
- Clematis virginiana L. – devil's darning needles, Virginia bower
- Clematis viridiflora Bertol.
- Clematis vitalba L. – traveller's joy, old man's beard
- Clematis viticaulis E.Steele – Millboro leather flower
- Clematis viticella L. – Italian leather flower, purple clematis

==== Formerly placed here ====
- Akebia trifoliata (Thunb.) Koidz. (as C. trifoliata Thunb.)

=== Subdivisions ===
One recent classification recognised 297 species of clematis. Consequently, taxonomists and gardeners subdivide the genus. Several classification systems exist.

Magnus Johnson divided Clematis into 19 sections, several with subsections. Christopher Grey-Wilson divided the genus into 9 subgenera (Clematis, Cheiropsis, Flammula, Archiclematis, Campanella, Atragene, Tubulosae, Pseudanemone, Viorna), several with sections and subsections within them. Several of the subdivisions are fairly consistent between these two systems; for example, all of Grey-Wilson's subgenera are used as sections by Johnson. Alternatively, John Howell defined twelve groups: the Evergreen, Alpina, Macropetala, Montana, Rockery, Early Large-Flowered, Late Large-Flowered, Herbaceous, Viticella, Texensis, Orientalis, and Late Mixed groups.

Many of the most popular garden forms are cultivars belonging to the Viticella section of the subgenus Flammula as defined by Grey-Wilson. These larger-flowered cultivars are often used within garden designs to climb archways, pergolas, or wall-mounted trellises, or to grow through companion plants. These forms normally have large 12–15 cm diameter upward-facing flowers and are believed to involve crosses of C. patens, C. lanuginosa, and C. viticella. Early-season, large-flowering forms such as 'Nelly Moser' tend towards the natural flowering habit of C. patens or C. lanuginosa while later-flowering forms such as ×jackmanii are nearer in habit to C. viticella.

== Garden history ==
Clematis patens C.Morren et Decne. (Kazaguruma), native to Japan, was introduced to Europe in 1836 by Philipp Franz Balthasar von Siebold. Today, it is the most frequently used species for developing large-flowered cultivars.

The wild Clematis species, such as Clematis florida, native to China had also made their way into Japanese gardens by the 17th century. These species were also brought to Europe through Japan.

Japanese garden selections, mostly cultivated in Edo Period using species that are native to Japan or China, were the first exotic clematises to reach European gardens, in the 18th century, long before the Chinese species were identified in their native habitat at the end of the 19th century.

After it arrived in Europe, it acquired several meanings during the Victorian era, famous for its nuanced flower symbolism. It came to symbolize both mental beauty and art as well as poverty.

== Cultivation ==
The climbing varieties are valued for their ability to scramble up walls, fences, and other structures, and also to grow through other plants, such as shrubs and trees. Some can be trained along the ground to provide cover. Because of their adaptability and masses of spectacular flowers, clematis are among the most popular of all garden plants. Many choice and rare cultivars are to be had from mail order and online catalogues. Specialists regularly put on displays in national flower shows such as the Chelsea Flower Show. In theory, it is possible to have a clematis in flower at any time throughout the year. Many varieties provide a second period of interest with a flush of flowers, or decorative seed heads.

They will grow in any good garden soil. The roots usually require a moist, cool substrate, while the herbage can take full sun. Some more delicate cultivars such as 'Nelly Moser' do better in light shade. Many clematis can be grown successfully in containers.

=== Pruning ===
Different varieties and cultivars require varied pruning regimes from no pruning to heavy pruning annually. The pruning regime for a cultivated clematis falls into three categories:

- Vigorous species and early-flowering hybrids do not require pruning, other than to occasionally remove tangled growth (as in C. armandii, C. montana, and C. tangutica)
- Large-flowered hybrids blooming in early summer on the previous season's growth can be pruned lightly in the dormant season for structure
- Late-flowering hybrids which bloom on the current season's growth can be pruned back to a pair of buds in the dormant season

== Cultivars ==
Over 80 varieties and cultivars have gained the Royal Horticultural Society's Award of Garden Merit.

In the Atragene group are woody deciduous climbers with bell-shaped flowers in spring, produced on the last year's growth. These include 'Markham's Pink', a pale pink breed.

In the early large-flowered group, which flower on the last year's growth, are:

- 'Arctic Queen' or 'Polar bear' (double white)
- 'Clematis Josephine' or 'Clematis Evijohill' (pinkish-mauve)
- 'Marie Boisselot' (white)
- 'Miss Bateman' (white with red stamens)
- 'Nelly Moser' (white with pink stripes)
- 'Niobe' (maroon)
- 'The President' (blue)

In the Clematis integrifolia group (or Integrifolia group) are non- or semi-climbing plants that flower on the current year's growth. These include the violet-pink 'Arabella'.

In the late large-flowered group, which flower on the current year's growth, are:

- 'Jackmanii' (purple)
- 'Polish spirit' (purple)
- 'Prince Charles' (violet)

In the Clematis montana group (or Montana group) are vigorous climbers that flower in spring, such as:

- 'Mayleen (pale pink)
- Clematis montana var. grandiflora (white)
- Clematis montana var. rubens 'Tetrarose' (rose pink with green stamens)

In the Clematis viticella group (or Viticella group) are compact deciduous climbers with small flowers produced on the current year's growth, such as:

- 'Alba Luxurians' (white)
- 'Betty Corning' (pale lilac pink)
- 'Madame Julia Correvon' (crimson)
- 'Purpurea Plena Elegans' (purple double)

Other breeds include:

- 'Princess Diana' of the Clematis texensis or Texensis group (deep pink)
- ×triternata rubromarginata (white & purple)

For further details see the List of Award of Garden Merit clematis.

== Horticultural classification ==
This follows the classification adopted by V. Matthews in The International Clematis Register and Checklist 2002, except that C. ispahanica, now considered to have been included in error, has been omitted from the list of parent species in Tangutica Group.

- Small-flowered Division: Flowers (1.5–)2–12(–18) cm across
  - Armandii Group: Cultivars belonging to, or derived from, species classified in subsection Meyenianae (Tamura) M. Johnson, mainly C. armandii.
  - Atragene Group: Cultivars belonging to, or derived from, species classified in subgenus Atragene (L.) Torrey & A. Gray, such as C. alpina, C. chiisanensis, C. fauriei, C. koreana, C. macropetala, C. ochotensis, C. sibirica, C. turkestanica. The former Alpina Group and Macropetala Group are included here. Historically, the Alpina Group was used for single-flowered cultivars, and double-flowered cultivars were assigned to the Macropetala Group.
  - Cirrhosa Group: Cultivars belonging to, or derived mainly from, C. cirrhosa.
  - Flammula Group: Cultivars with at least one parent belonging to, or derived from, species classified in section Flammula DC. (excluding subsection Meyenianae (Tamura)M. Johnson), such as C. angustifolia, C. flammula, C. recta, C. terniflora.
  - Forsteri Group: Cultivars belonging to, or derived from, species classified in section Novae-zeelandiae M. Johnson (native to Australia and New Zealand) such as C. australis, C. foetida, C. forsteri, C. marata, C. marmoraria, C. paniculata, C. petriei.
  - Heracleifolia Group: Cultivars with at least one parent belonging to, or derived from, species classified in subgenus Tubulosa (Decne.) Grey-Wilson, such as C. heracleifolia, C. stans, C. tubulosa.
  - Integrifolia Group: Cultivars belonging to, or derived mainly from, C. integrifolia. Includes the Diversifolia Group (which covered C. × diversifolia (C. integrifolia × C. viticella) and its cultivars).
  - Montana Group: Cultivars belonging to, or derived from, species classified in section Montanae (Schneider) Grey-Wilson such as C. chrysocoma, C. montana, C. spooneri.
  - Tangutica Group: Cultivars with at least one parent belonging to, or derived from, species classified in section Meclatis (Spach) Baill., such as C. intricata, C. ladakhiana, C. orientalis, C. serratifolia, C. tangutica, C. tibetana. This Group has also been known as the Orientalis Group.
  - Texensis Group: Cultivars derived from C. texensis crossed with representatives from either of the Large-flowered Groups.
  - Viorna Group: Cultivars with at least one parent belonging to, or derived from, species classified in section Viorna A. Gray, such as C. crispa, C. fusca, C. ianthina, C. pitcheri, C. reticulata, C. texensis, C. viorna. Cultivars assigned to Texensis Group, and cultivars with C. integrifolia in their parentage, are excluded.
  - Vitalba Group: Cultivars with at least one parent belonging to, or derived from, species classified in section Clematis L., such as C. ligusticifolia, C. potaninii, C. vitalba, C. virginiana.
  - Viticella Group: Cultivars with at least one parent mainly derived from C. viticella. Excludes hybrids between C. integrifolia and C. viticella: see Integrifolia Group.
- Large-flowered Division: Flowers (5–)10–22(–29) cm across, usually flat.
  - Early Large-flowered Group: Comprises the former Patens Group and Fortunei Group. Cultivars of the Patens Group were derived mainly from C. patens, either directly or indirectly. They were characterized by producing flowers in spring on the previous year's wood, and often again in summer or early autumn on the current year's growth. The former Fortunei Group (also known as Florida Group, although it had nothing to do with C. florida) comprised cultivars with double or semi-double flowers that were produced on the previous year's growth in spring. Hybridization has made it impossible to keep the original Groups separate: there are a number of cultivars that produce both single and double flowers, or that only produce semi-double or double flowers under certain conditions.
  - Late Large-flowered Group: Comprises the former Lanuginosa Group and Jackmanii Group. Cultivars of the Lanuginosa Group were derived mainly from C. lanuginosa, either directly or indirectly. The Jackmanii Group covered cultivars produced from a cross between C. viticella (or a derivative therefrom) and a member of the Patens Group. Both Groups produce their flowers on the current year's growth in summer and autumn. It is often impossible to say whether a cultivar belongs to the Lanuginosa Group or to the Jackmanii Group, due to hybridization and/or lack of information on the parentage, so it is not possible to maintain these Groups.

== Use and toxicity ==
The European species did not enter into the herbalists' pharmacopeia. In the American Old West, the Western white clematis, Clematis ligusticifolia, was called pepper vine by early travelers and pioneers, who took a tip from Spanish colonials and used seeds and the acrid leaves of yerba de chivato as a pepper substitute. The entire genus contains essential oils and compounds which are extremely irritating to the skin and mucous membranes. Unlike black pepper or Capsicum, however, the compounds in clematis cause internal bleeding of the digestive tract if ingested in large amounts. C. ligusticifolia is essentially toxic. When pruning them, it is a good idea to wear gloves. Despite its toxicity, Native Americans used very small amounts of clematis as an effective treatment for migraine headaches and nervous disorders. It was also used as an effective treatment of skin infections. Clematis is also a constituent of Bach's Rescue Remedy. Leaf extracts from two Ethiopian species (Clematis longicauda steud ex A. Rich. and Clematis burgensis Engl.) are used locally to treat ear disorders and eczema. Phytochemical screening of the extracts from both of these species showed antibacterial and antifungal activity. The extracts of these plants also possess wound healing and anti-inflammatory activities which could also be attributed to the phytoconstituents.

Clematis has been listed as one of the 38 plants used to prepare Bach flower remedies, a kind of alternative medicine promoted for its effect on health. However, according to Cancer Research UK, "there is no scientific evidence to prove that flower remedies can control, cure or prevent any type of disease, including cancer".

== Pests and diseases ==
Clematis species are susceptible to several pests and diseases. Clematis wilt, a stem rot caused by the fungus Phoma clematidina, causes dramatic wilting and death of whole branches, although many species are resistant to it. The species of this genus are also alternate hosts of Puccinia recondita f.sp. tritici. C. mandshurica specifically is known to provide inoculum transferrable to wheat in the former eastern Soviet territories, and several of this genus are hosts for several other P. recondita strains and other Puccinia. Other pests and diseases include powdery mildew, viruses, slugs and snails, scale insects, aphids, earwigs, and green flower disease, which is usually caused by infection with a phytoplasma, a type of bacterium.
