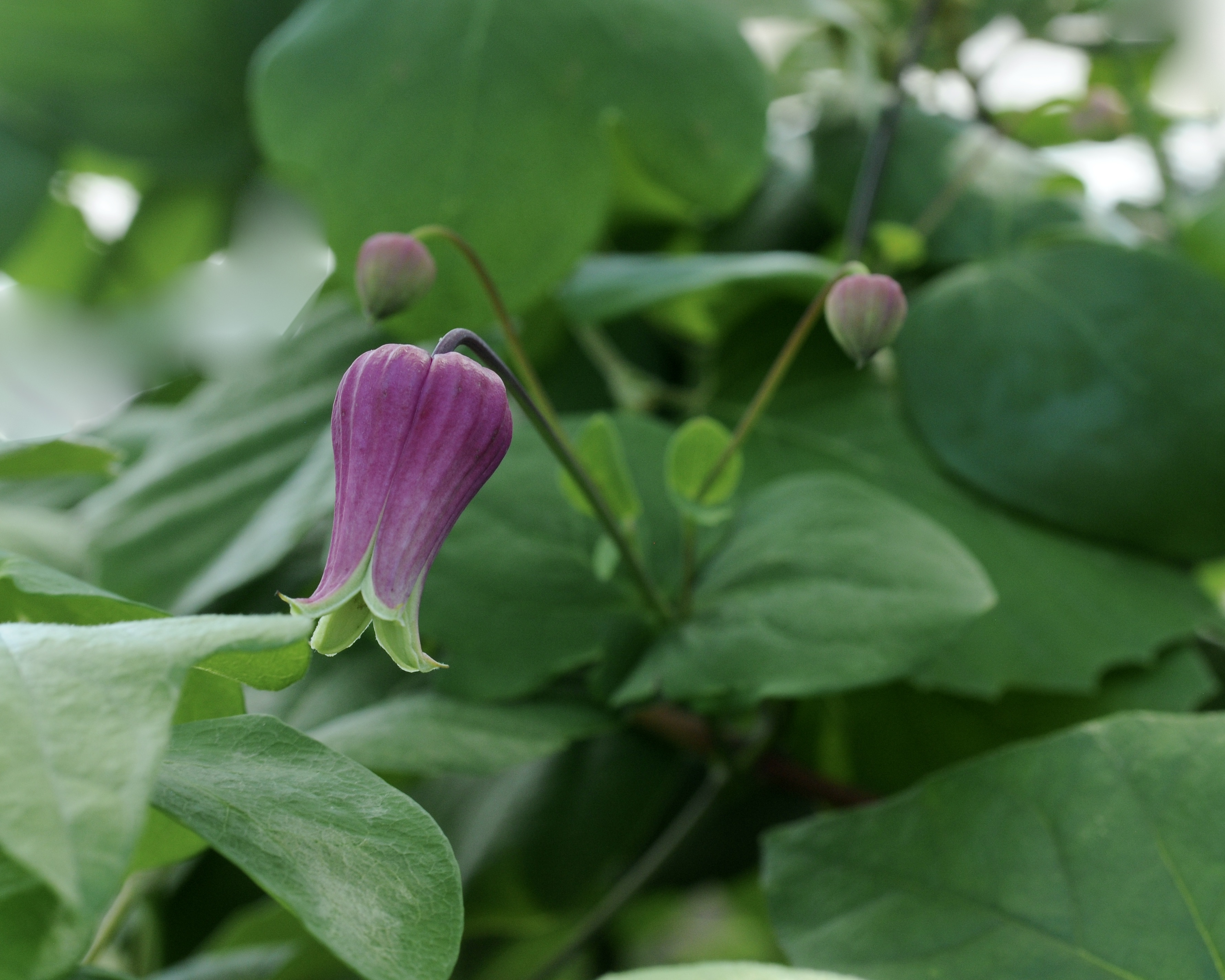

Scientific classification
- Kingdom: Plantae
- Clade: Tracheophytes
- Clade: Angiosperms
- Clade: Eudicots
- Order: Ranunculales
- Family: Ranunculaceae
- Genus: Clematis
- Species: C. glaucophylla

Binomial name
- Clematis glaucophylla Small

Synonyms
- Coriflora glaucophylla (Small) W.A.Weber; Viorna glaucophylla (Small) Small

= Clematis glaucophylla =

Species of flowering plant

Clematis glaucophylla, the whiteleaf leather-flower, is a species of flowering plant in the family Ranunculaceae. It is native to a subset of the southeastern US states, and to Oklahoma. A perennial vine reaching 5 m (16 ft), sources differ on its preferred habitat(s) and on which states it occurs.
