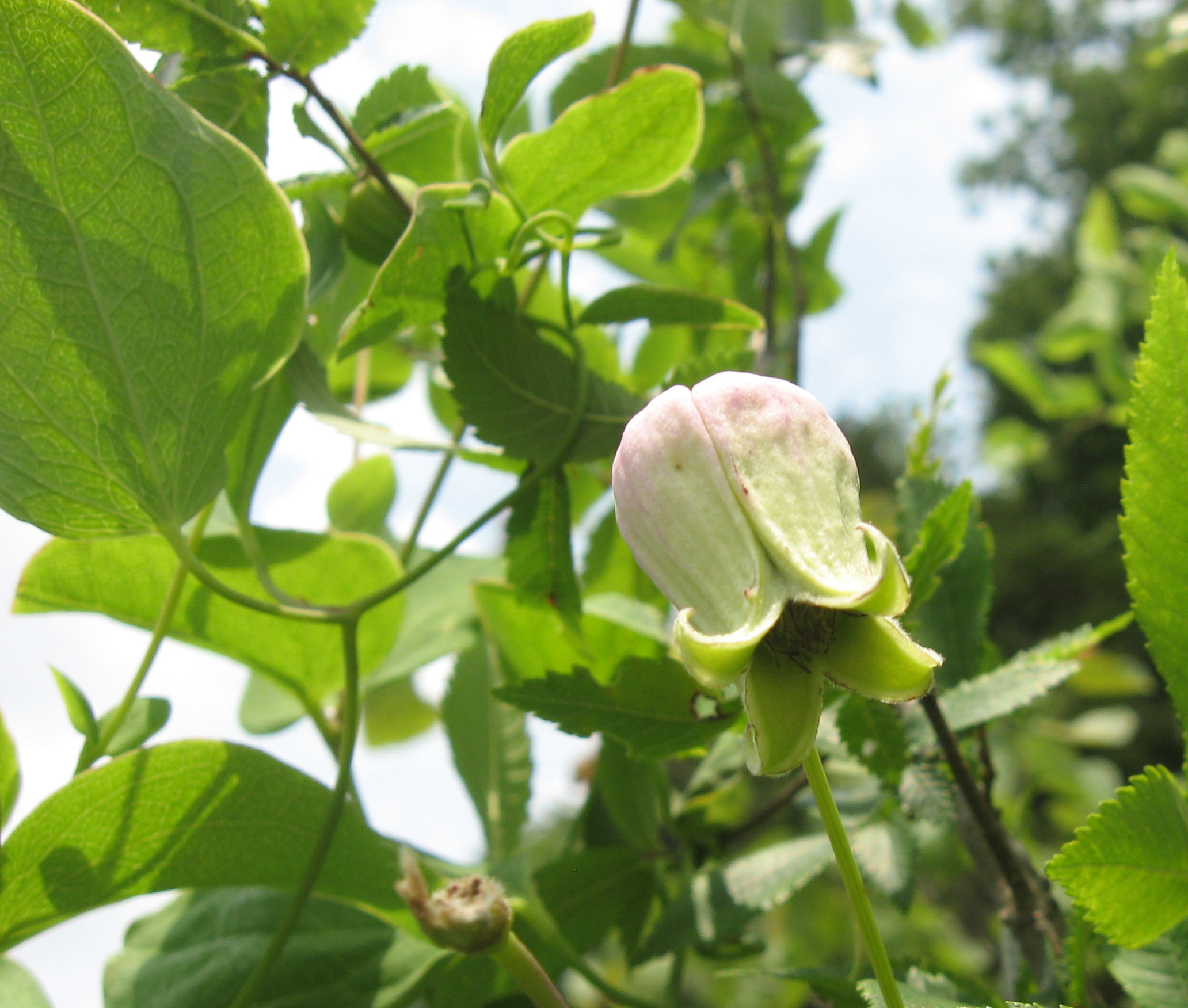

Conservation status
- Secure (NatureServe)

Scientific classification
- Kingdom: Plantae
- Clade: Tracheophytes
- Clade: Angiosperms
- Clade: Eudicots
- Order: Ranunculales
- Family: Ranunculaceae
- Genus: Clematis
- Species: C. versicolor

Binomial name
- Clematis versicolor Small

= Clematis versicolor =

Species of flowering plant in the buttercup family

Clematis versicolor (pale leatherflower) is a species of flowering plant in the Buttercup family. It is a twining vine native to the Southeastern United States and Ozark Mountains. In this range it is found in scattered calcareous regions, where it is found on limestone outcrops, in thickets, and dry woods. It flowers in the summer.

It is distinguished from similar-looking species by its white-waxy, generally hairless, leathery leaves, and its lavender to cream colored flowers.
