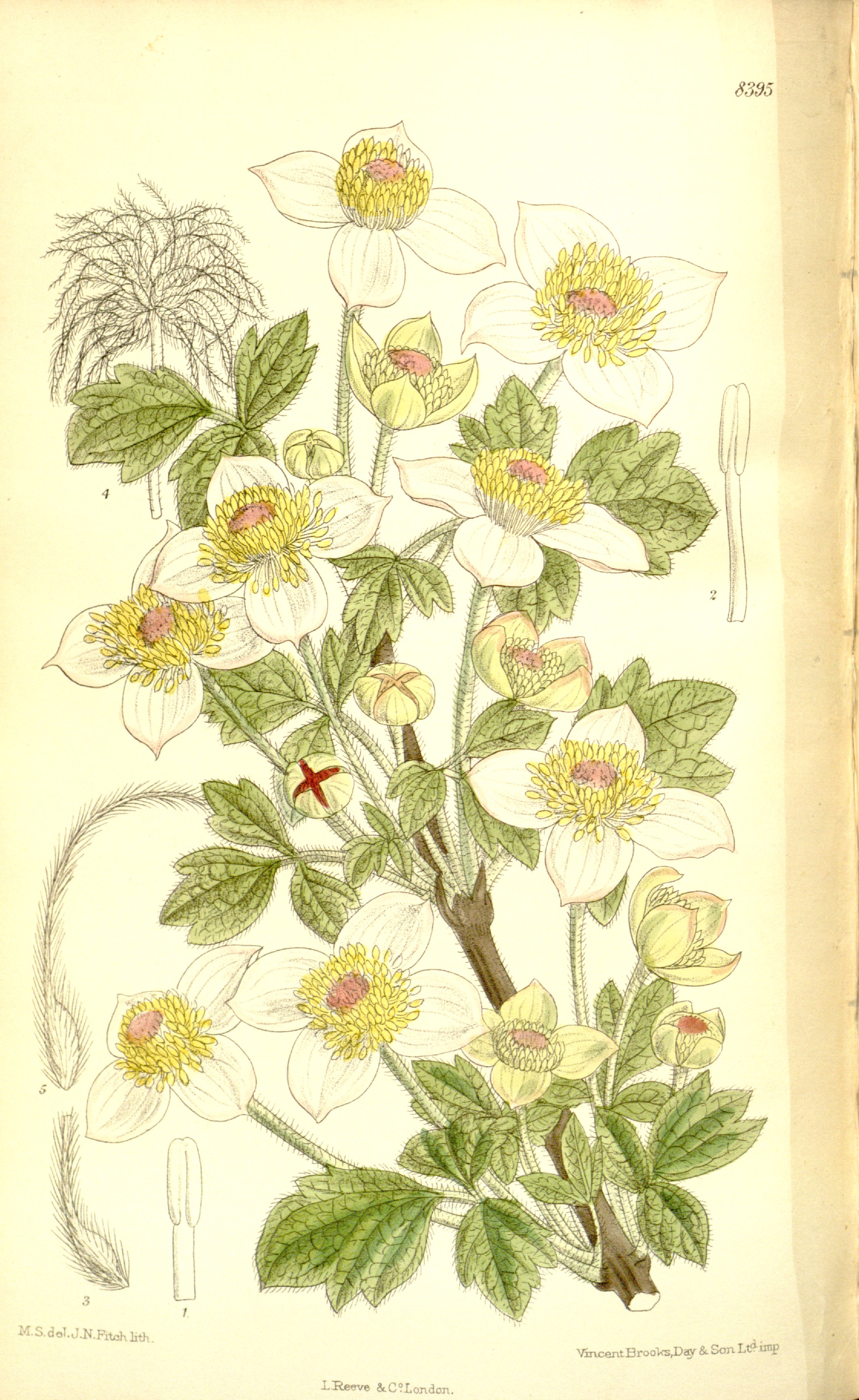
- Illustration of Clematis chrysocoma

Scientific classification
- Kingdom: Plantae
- Clade: Tracheophytes
- Clade: Angiosperms
- Clade: Eudicots
- Order: Ranunculales
- Family: Ranunculaceae
- Genus: Clematis
- Species: C. chrysocoma

Binomial name
- Clematis chrysocoma Franch.

= Clematis chrysocoma =

Gold wool clematis

Species of flowering plant in the buttercup family

Clematis chrysocoma, the gold wool clematis, is a flowering vine of the genus Clematis. It has showy flowers like many members of that genus, but it also has a yellow down covering its young branches, leaves, and flower stalks. It is endemic to southern China (W Guizhou, W Sichuan, Yunnan).

Clematis armandii bears clusters of long-stalked 2-inch (51 mm) pinkish white flowers twice each year. It grows to 6–8 feet (1.8–2.4 m) high and tolerates shade well compared to other varieties of clematis. It is native to western China; in the US it grows best in American Horticultural Society zones 9 to 6, which are generally found in the southern US.
