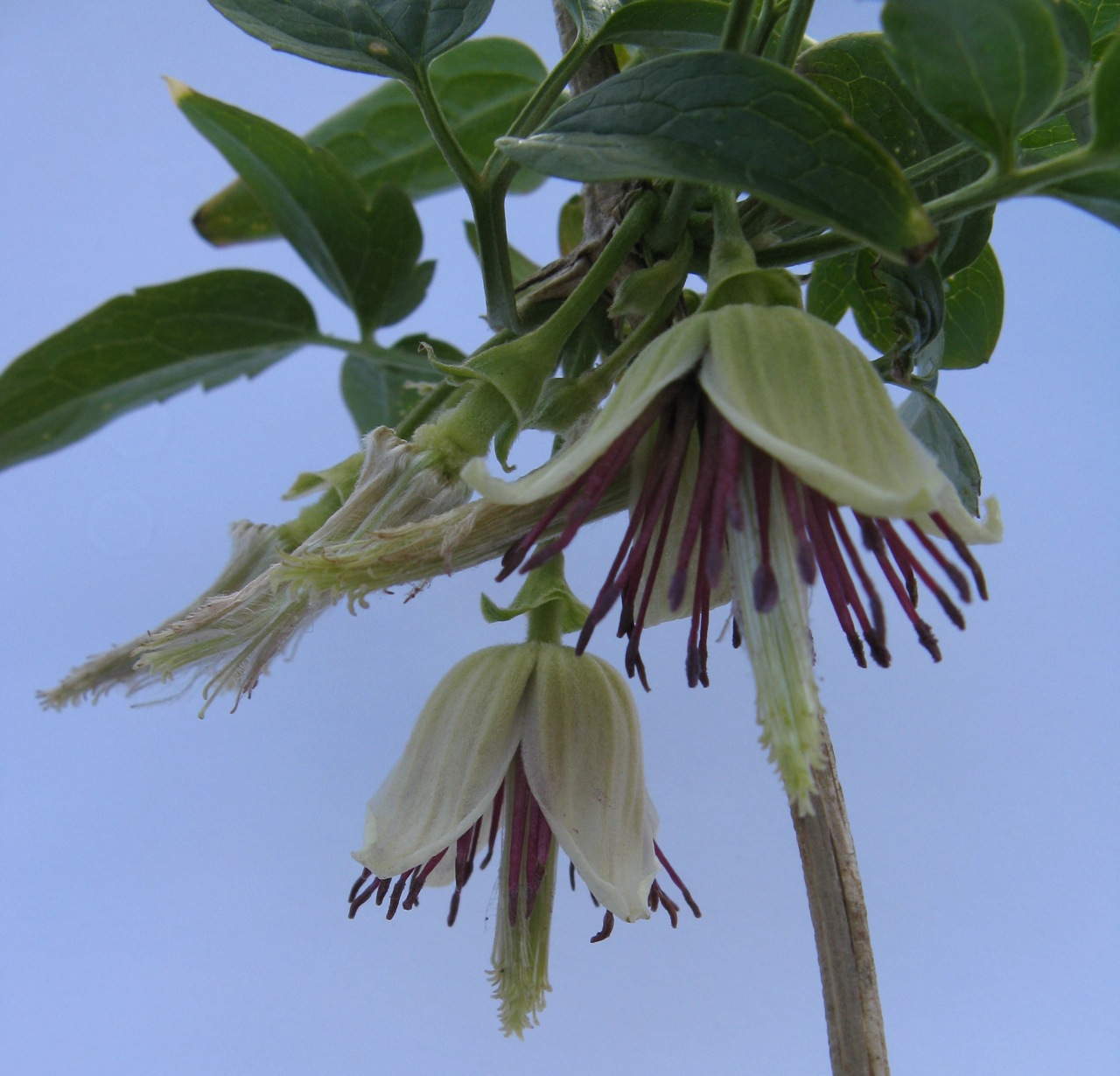

Scientific classification
- Kingdom: Plantae
- Clade: Tracheophytes
- Clade: Angiosperms
- Clade: Eudicots
- Order: Ranunculales
- Family: Ranunculaceae
- Genus: Clematis
- Species: C. napaulensis

Binomial name
- Clematis napaulensis DC.

Synonyms
- C. cirrhosa subsp. heterophylla Kuntze; C. cirrhosa var. napaulensis (DC.) Kuntze; C. forrestii W.W.Sm.; C. montana D.Don nom. illeg.

= Clematis napaulensis =

Species of flowering plant in the buttercup family

Clematis napaulensis (syn. Clematis forrestii W.W.Sm.), the Nepal clematis, is a species of flowering plant in the buttercup family Ranunculaceae. It is native to China and the Indian subcontinent, including Nepal, whence the specific epithet napaulensis.

The nodding flowers are up to 3 cm (1.2 in) across and scented. The short outer petals are cream-coloured, and they surround several long stamens with deep red anthers. They are followed by handsome large fruit clusters and fluffy seed-heads. The plant will not survive harsh winter climates, but grows well in warm or coastal areas where the temperature does not fall below −5 °C (23 °F). It prefers a sheltered position with the flowers in full sun. Like all clematis, the root-run does best in moist, shaded conditions.
