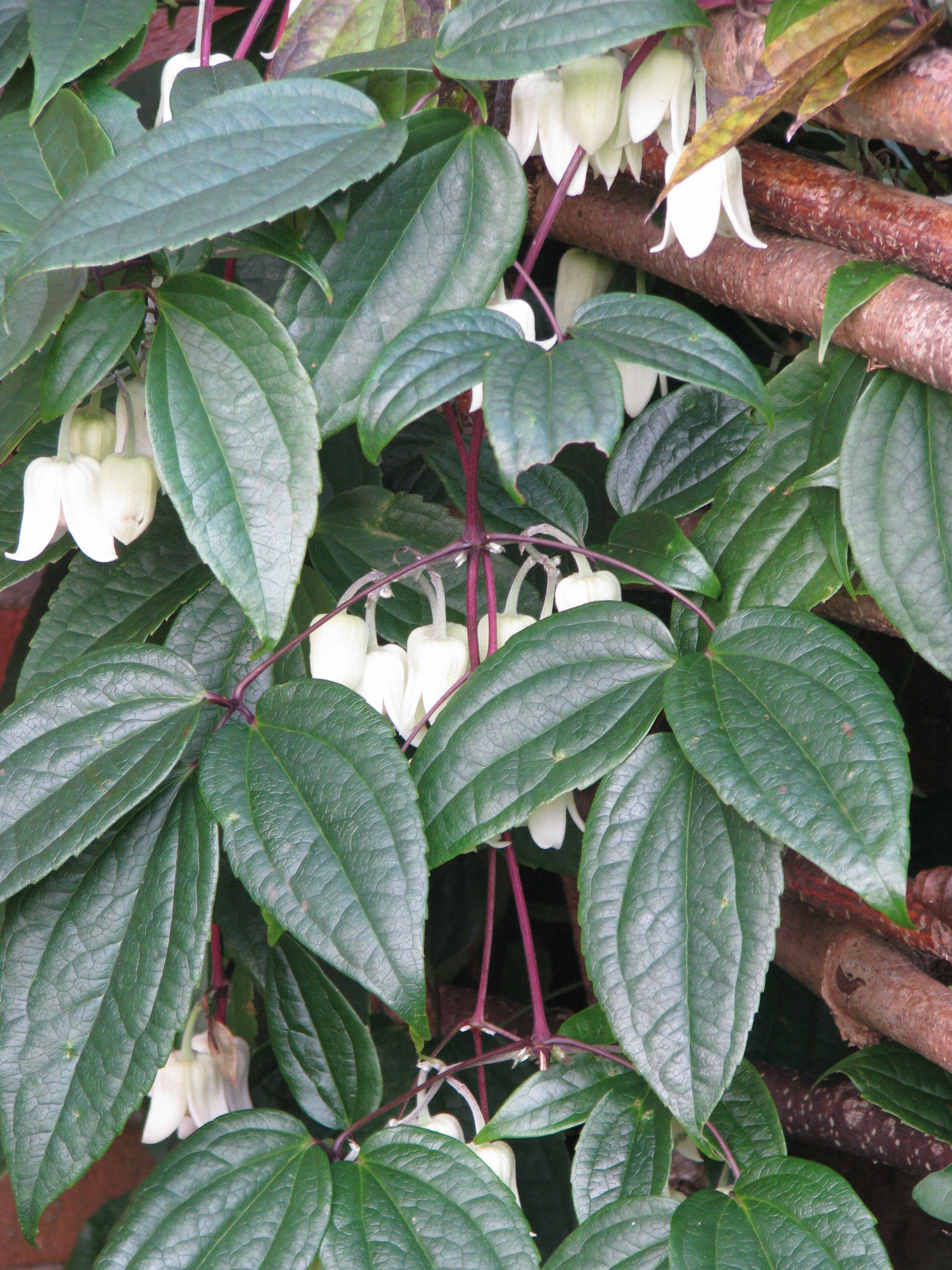
- Bell-shaped flowers and evergreen foliage

Scientific classification
- Kingdom: Plantae
- Clade: Tracheophytes
- Clade: Angiosperms
- Clade: Eudicots
- Order: Ranunculales
- Family: Ranunculaceae
- Genus: Clematis
- Species: C. urophylla

Binomial name
- Clematis urophylla Franch.

= Clematis urophylla =

Species of vine

Clematis urophylla is a species of flowering plant in the genus Clematis in the family Ranunculaceae. It is native to China, specifically the southwest or south central and southeast. It can be found wild in the provinces of Guangdong, Guangxi, Guizhou, Hubei, Hunan, and Sichuan.

== Description ==
Clematis urophylla is a woody evergreen climber. In its native range, it typically flowers from November-December, and fruits from March-April. It grows in forests, slopes, and scrub.

Cultivars of this species include 'Winter Beauty'.

== Etymology ==
Clematis is derived from Greek and means 'climbing plant'.

Urophylla is derived from Greek and means 'tail-leaved', a reference to its 'drip tips', which are elongated leaf tips that allow the leaves to easily shed water.
