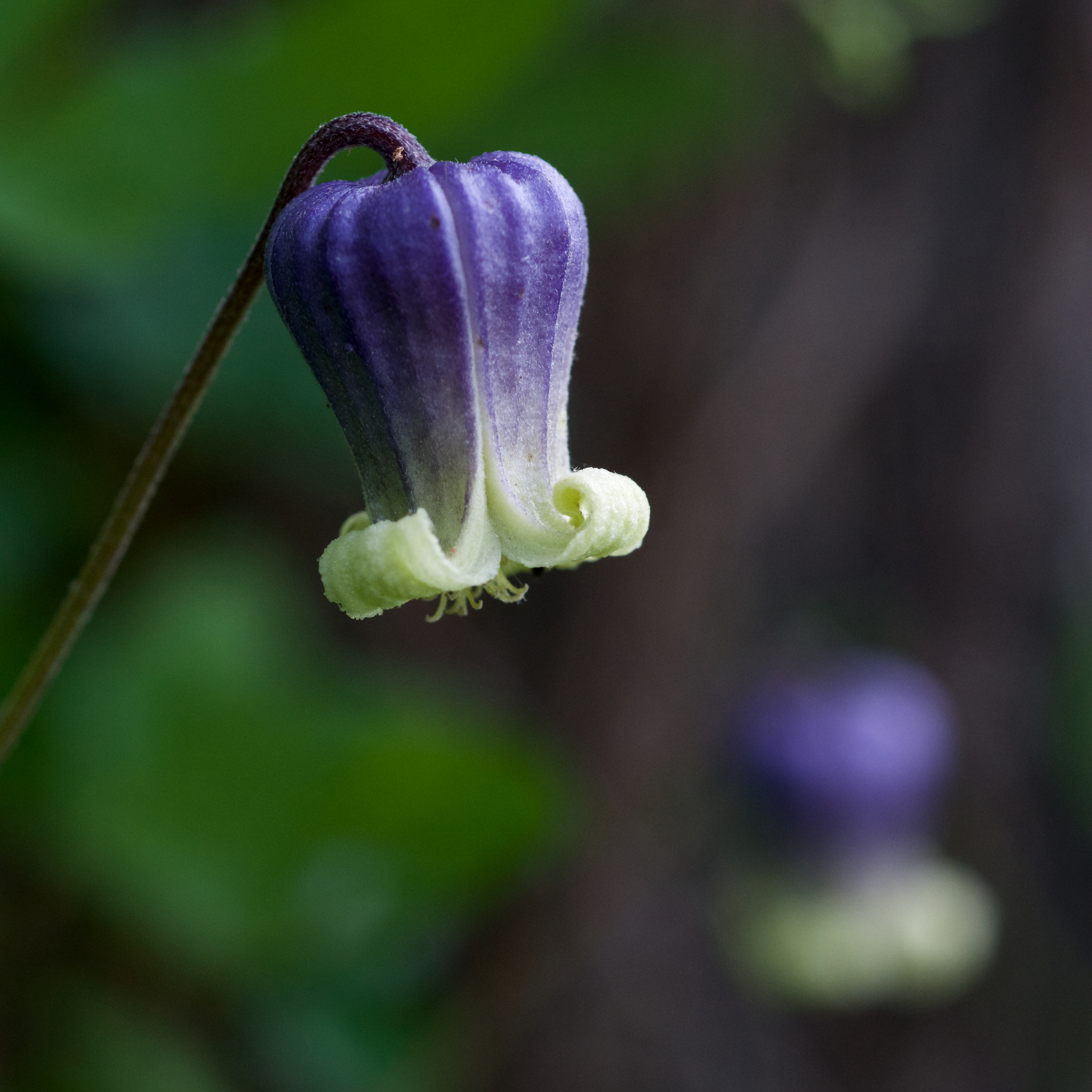

Conservation status
- Apparently Secure (NatureServe)

Scientific classification
- Kingdom: Plantae
- Clade: Tracheophytes
- Clade: Angiosperms
- Clade: Eudicots
- Order: Ranunculales
- Family: Ranunculaceae
- Genus: Clematis
- Species: C. pitcheri

Binomial name
- Clematis pitcheri Torr. & A.Gray

= Clematis pitcheri =

Species of flowering plant in the buttercup family

Clematis pitcheri is a species of flowering plant in the buttercup family known by the common name bluebill. It is a herbaceous, perennial vine found in the south-central United States and northern Mexico. It grows in wooded, rocky outcrops, woodland margins, bluffs, and disturbed habitats. Leaves are variable, oppositely arranged along the stems, and can be simple or compound. In the fall it will die back to ground level.
