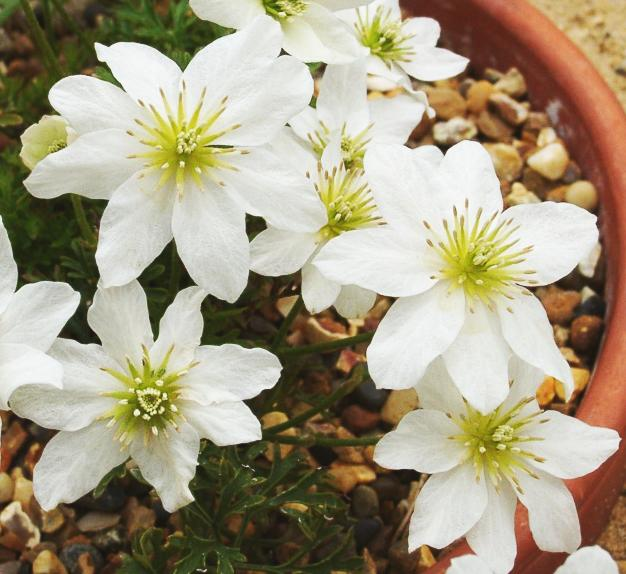

Scientific classification
- Kingdom: Plantae
- Clade: Tracheophytes
- Clade: Angiosperms
- Clade: Eudicots
- Order: Ranunculales
- Family: Ranunculaceae
- Genus: Clematis
- Species: C. marmoraria

Binomial name
- Clematis marmoraria Sneddon

= Clematis marmoraria =

Species of flowering plant in the buttercup family

Clematis marmoraria (New Zealand dwarf clematis) is an evergreen plant with parsley-like, leathery and dark green foliage. The white flowers are about 2 centimetres (0.79 inches) wide, blooming in early spring.

== Habitat ==
This clematis can be found growing in alpine marble karrenfeld either in crevices in massive marble, or amongst semi-fixed rocks, stones, and similar rocky sites in open herbfield.

== Uses ==
Clematis × cartmanii is a hybrid between Clematis marmoraria and Clematis paniculata that is grown ornamentally. The hybrid was created by New Zealand horticulturalist Joe Cartman and several popular cultivars of the cross are now in cultivation.
