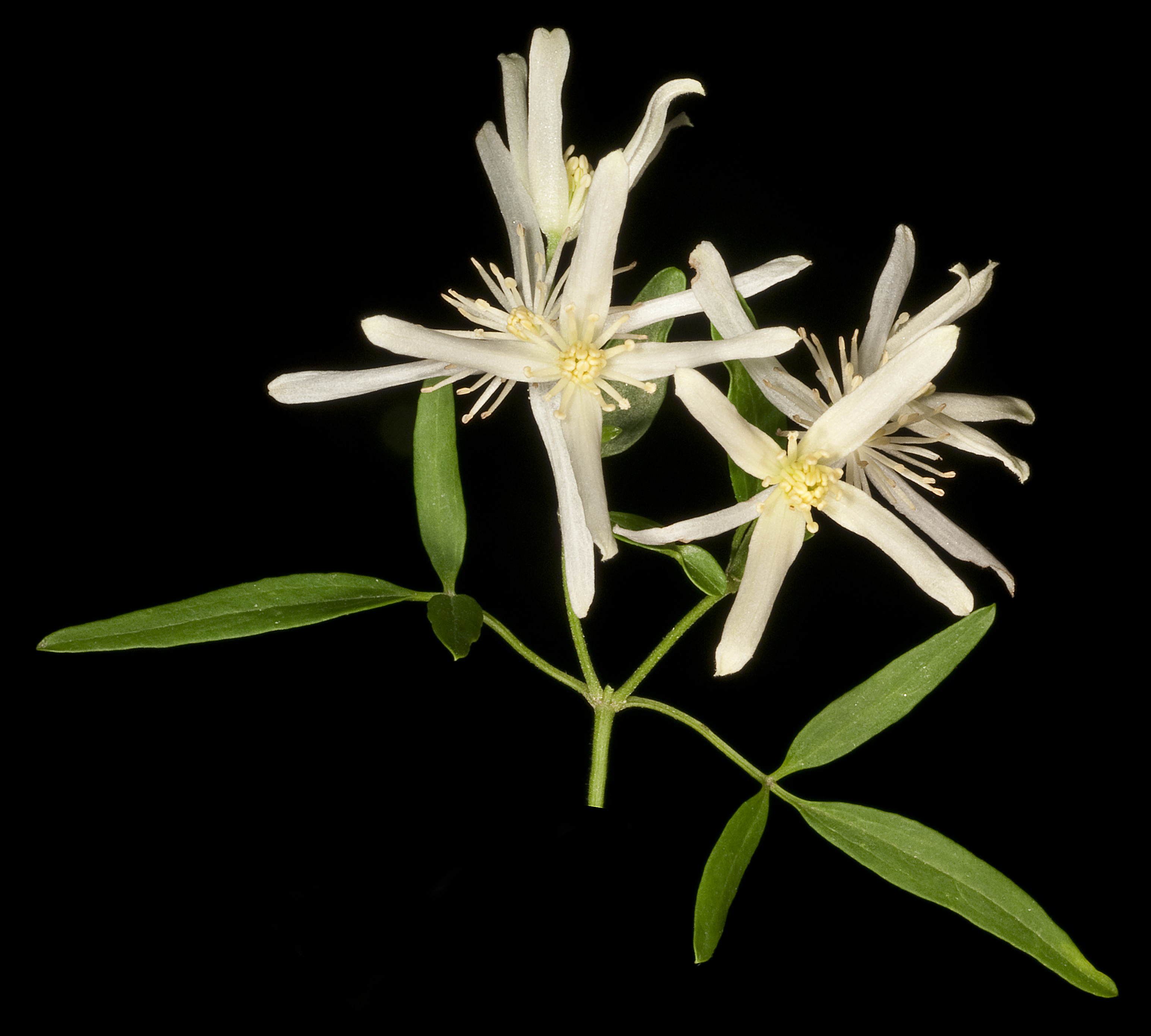

Scientific classification
- Kingdom: Plantae
- Clade: Tracheophytes
- Clade: Angiosperms
- Clade: Eudicots
- Order: Ranunculales
- Family: Ranunculaceae
- Genus: Clematis
- Species: C. linearifolia

Binomial name
- Clematis linearifolia Steud.

Synonyms
- Clematis hexapetala subsp. linearifolia (Steud.) Kuntze; Clematis microphylla var. linearifolia (Steud.) Ostenf. Clematis microphylla var. occidentalis Benth.

= Clematis linearifolia =

Species of flowering plant in the buttercup family

Clematis linearifolia is a vine in the Ranunculaceae family, endemic to south-west Western Australia.

It was first described in 1845 by Ernst von Steudel, from a specimen collected on Rottnest Island on 18 July 1839.

== Description ==
It is a dioecious woody climber growing up to 5 m tall.
