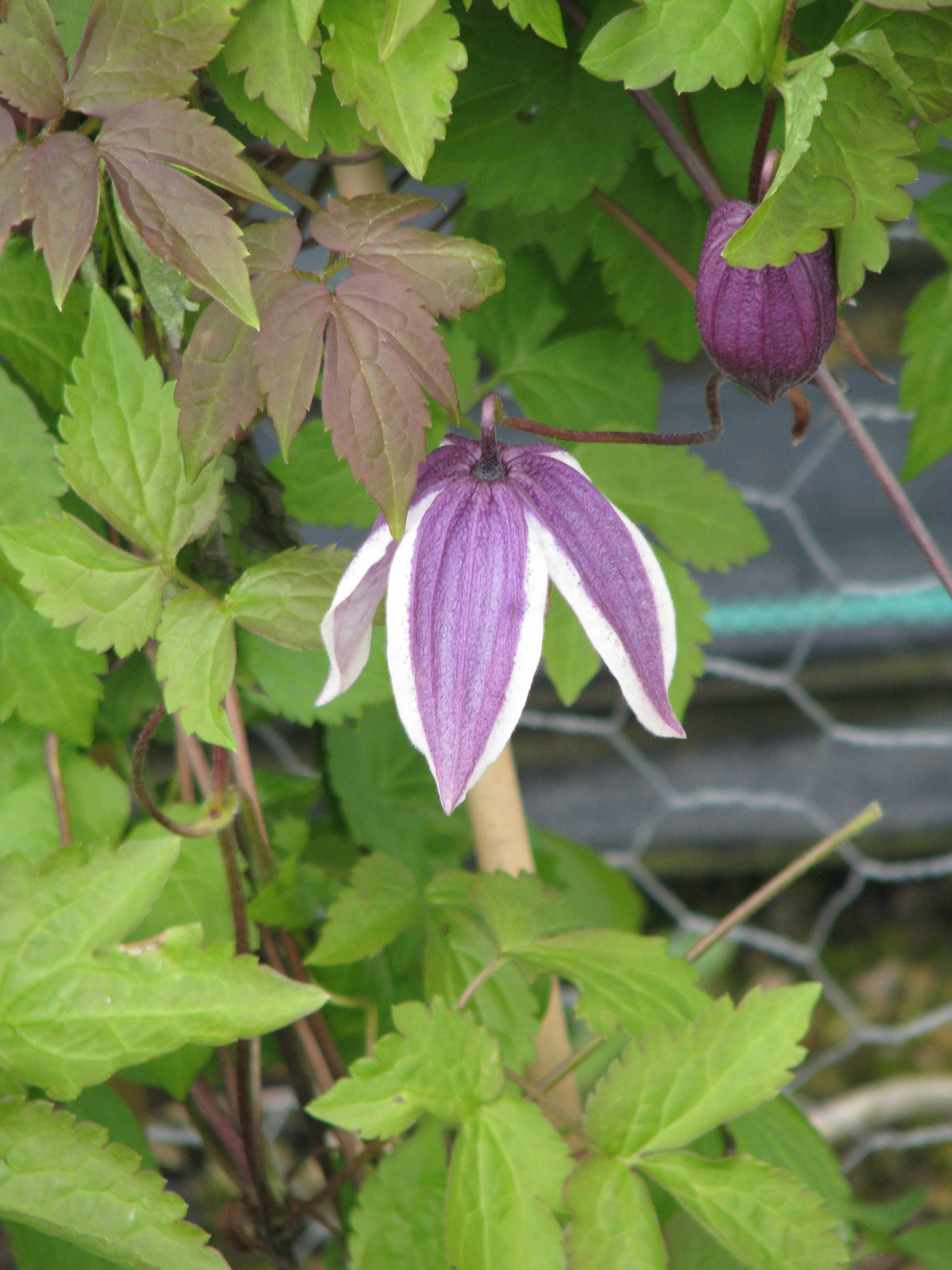
- 'Blue Eclipse' cultivar
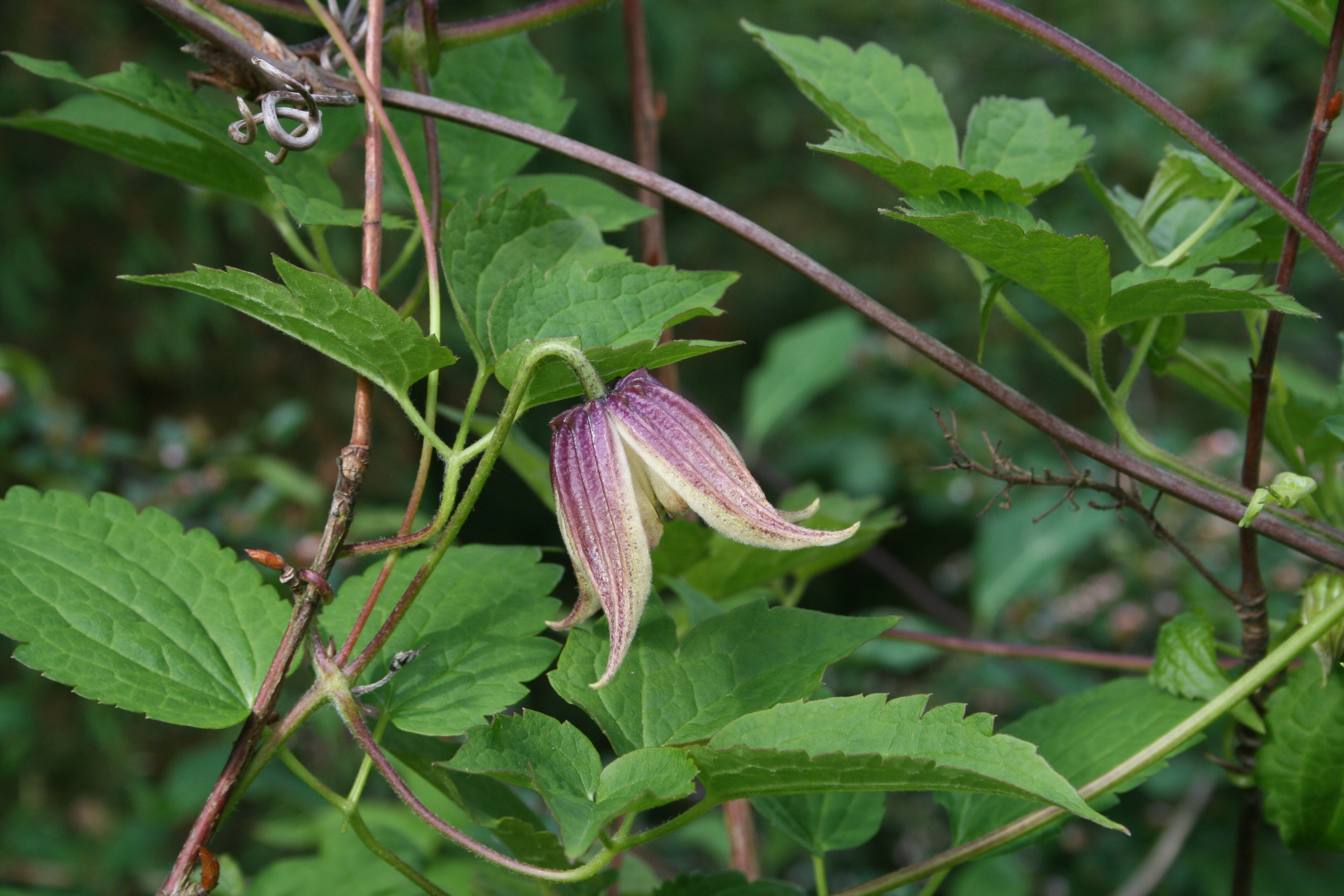
- Wild-type

Scientific classification
- Kingdom: Plantae
- Clade: Tracheophytes
- Clade: Angiosperms
- Clade: Eudicots
- Order: Ranunculales
- Family: Ranunculaceae
- Genus: Clematis
- Species: C. koreana

Binomial name
- Clematis koreana Kom.

Synonyms
- List: Atragene koreana (Kom.) Kom.; Clematis alpina var. carunculosa Gagnep.; Clematis alpina var. koreana (Kom.) Nakai; Clematis alpina var. umbrosa (Nakai) W.J.Yang & L.Q.Li; Clematis chiisanensis Nakai; Clematis chiisanensis var. carunculosa (Gagnep.) Rehder; Clematis kogenensis W.T.Wang; Clematis komaroviana Koidz.; Clematis komarovii Koidz.; Clematis koreana f. biternata (Nakai) M.Kim; Clematis koreana var. biternata Nakai; Clematis koreana var. carunculosa (Gagnep.) Tamura; Clematis koreana f. chiisanensis (Nakai) M.Kim; Clematis koreana f. lutea Rehder; Clematis koreana var. lutea (Rehder) M.Johnson; Clematis koreana f. umbrosa (Nakai) M.Kim; Clematis koreana var. umbrosa Nakai; Clematis ochotensis var. triphylla Ohwi; Clematis triphylla (Ohwi) Ohwi; Clematis umbrosa (Nakai) Nakai

= Clematis koreana =

Species of plant

Clematis koreana is a species of flowering plant in the family Ranunculaceae. It is native to Manchuria, the Korean Peninsula, and Primorsky Krai in the Russian Far East. A deciduous woody vine climbing up to 3 m (10 ft), it is typically found in woodlands and scrublands at elevations from 1,000 to 1,900 m (3,300 to 6,200 ft). A number of cultivars and hybrid cultivars are available, including Amber, 'Blue Eclipse', 'Broughton Bride', 'Brunette', I am Red Robin, 'Lemon Bells', and 'Purple Rain'.

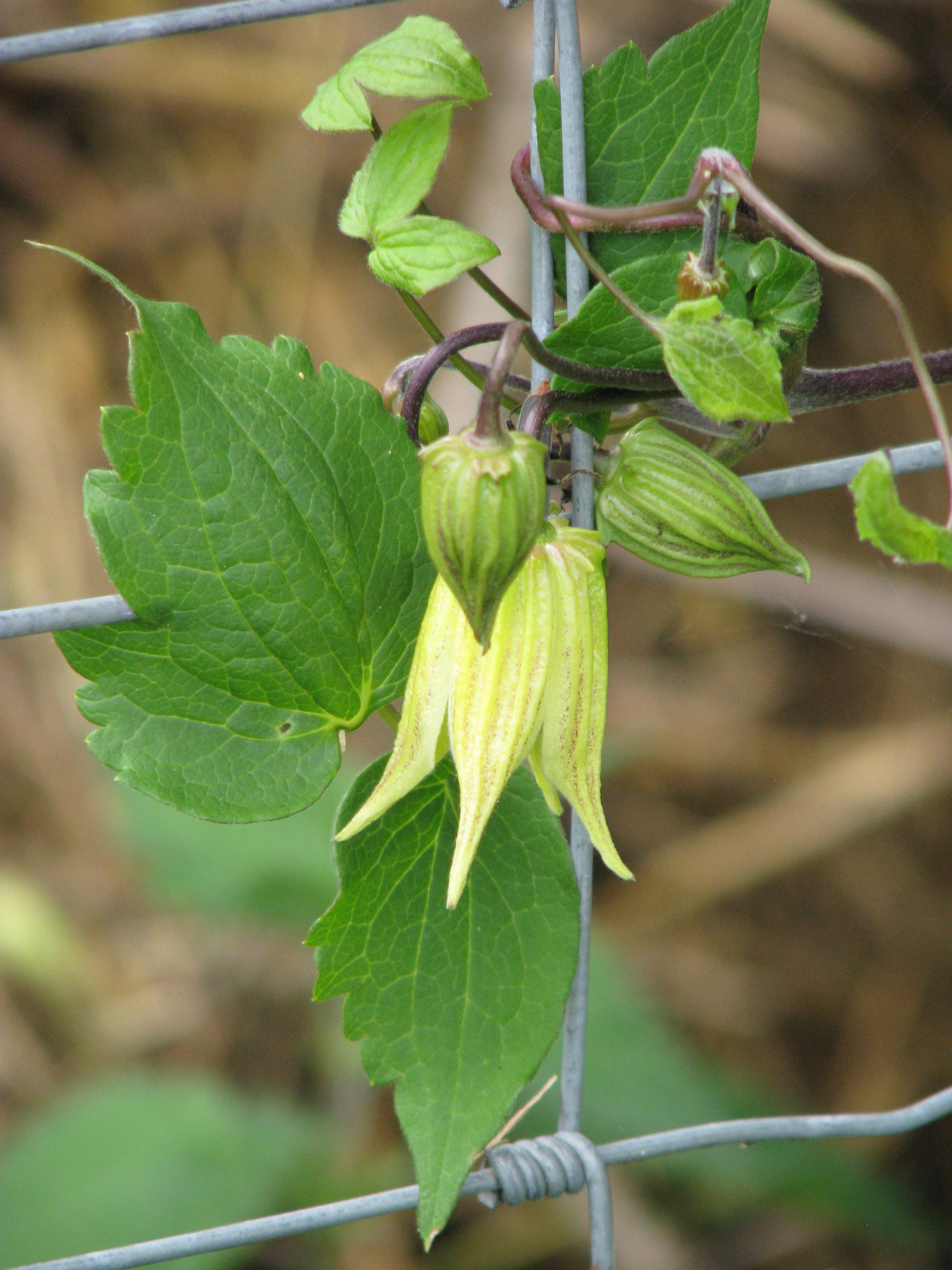
Synonym C. k. var. carunculosa, also synonym C. chiisanensis, with yellow flowers

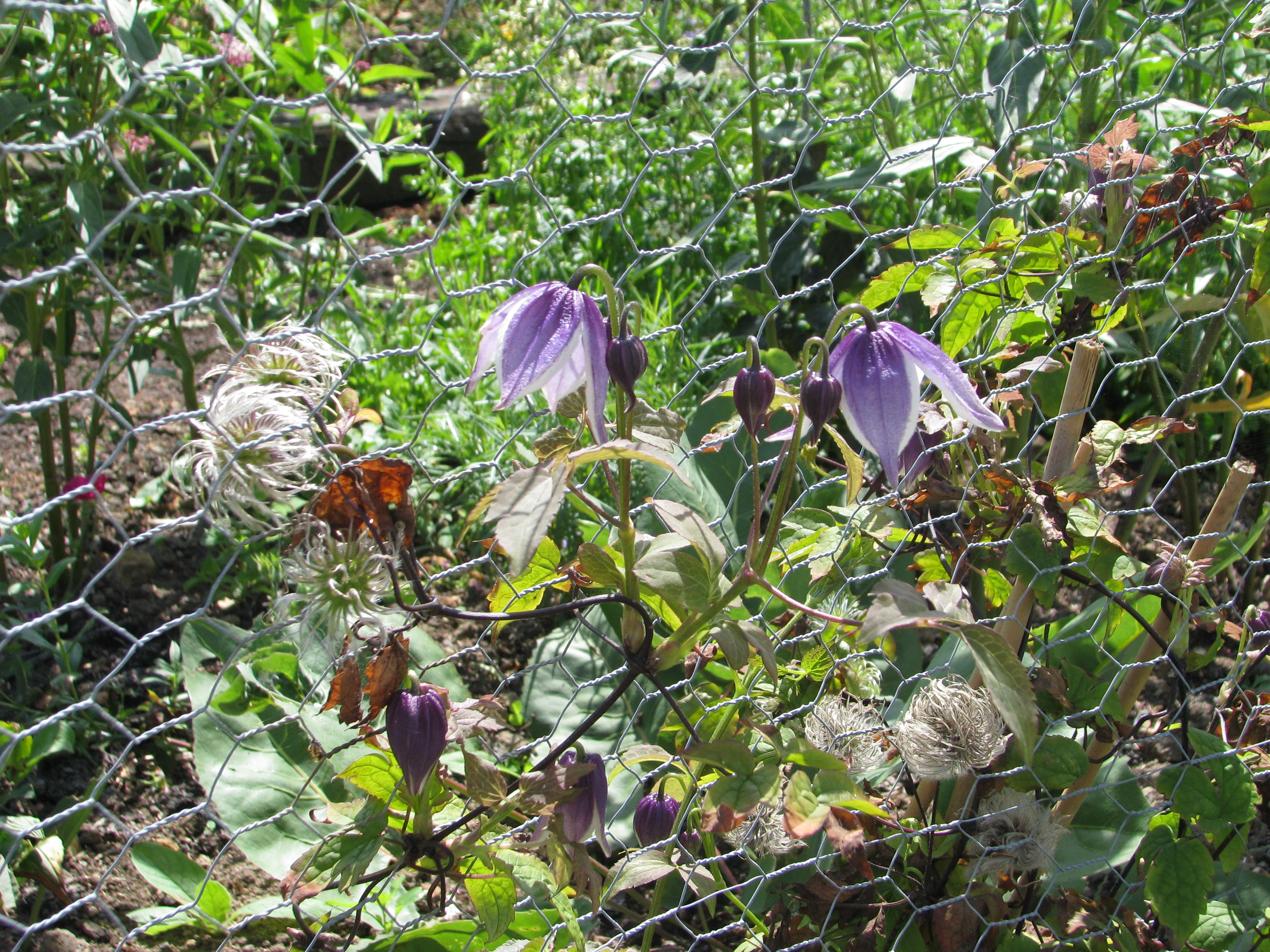
Some seedheads
