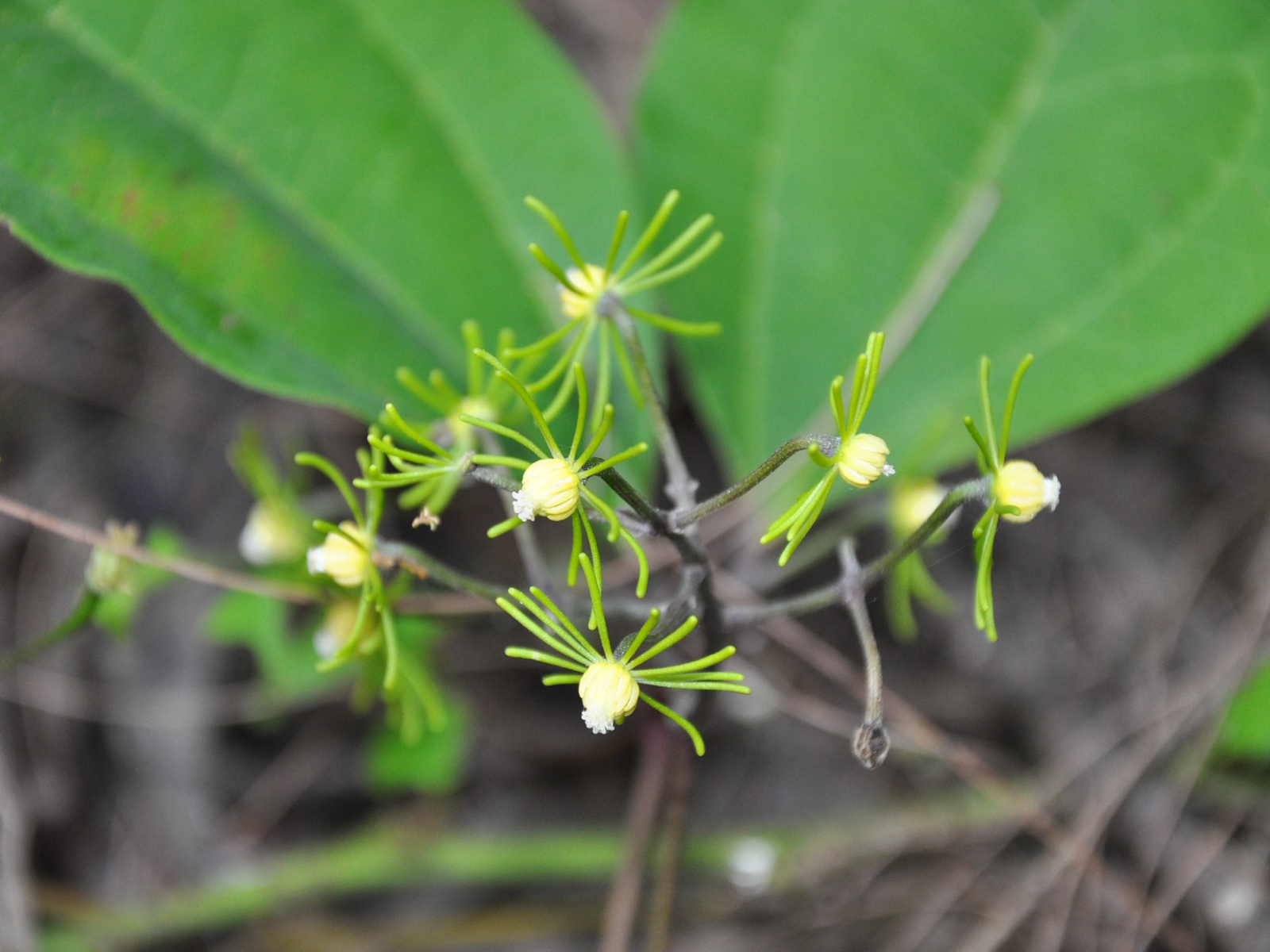

Scientific classification
- Kingdom: Plantae
- Clade: Tracheophytes
- Clade: Angiosperms
- Clade: Eudicots
- Order: Ranunculales
- Family: Ranunculaceae
- Genus: Clematis
- Species: C. horripilata

Binomial name
- Clematis horripilata D.Falck & Lehtonen

Synonyms
- Naravelia laurifolia Wall. ex Hook.f. & Thomson; Naravelia loheri Merr. & Rolfe; Naravelia pauciflora H.Eichler

= Clematis horripilata =

Species of flowering plant in the buttercup family

Clematis horripilata is a species of vine in the family Ranunculaceae. Its inflorescence contains several light greenish yellow flowers. This plant can be found in South Asia and Southeast Asia. It has been known by the synonym Naravelia laurifolia.

== Description ==
Clematis horripilata is a perennial climbing plant which grows primarily in a wet, temperate forest habitat up to altitudes of 51 metres. Leaves are broad and lanceolate; petals are linear, and green with yellow ovaries. Tendrils are trifurcate.
