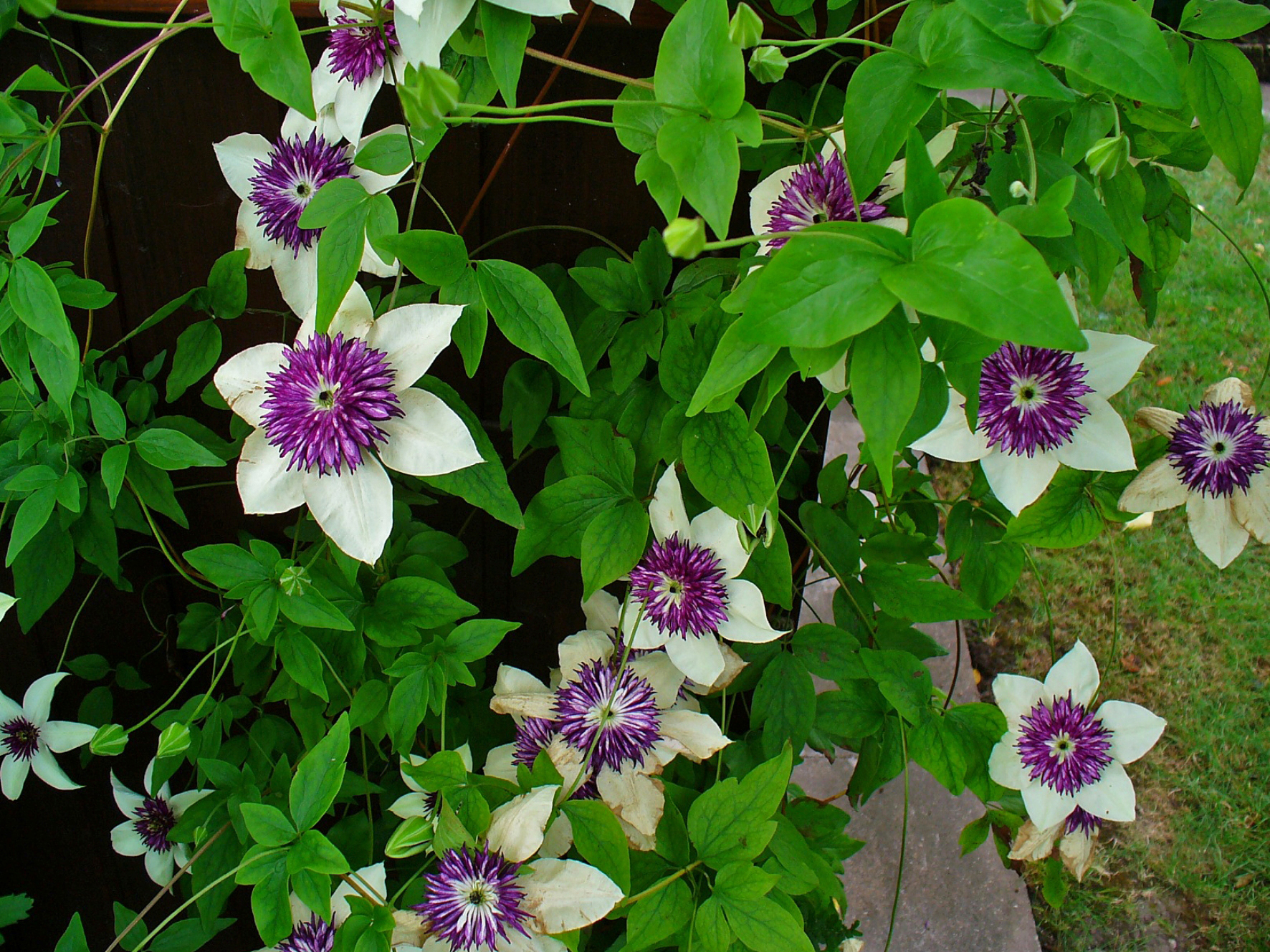
- Clematis florida 'Sieboldiana' aka 'Sieboldii'
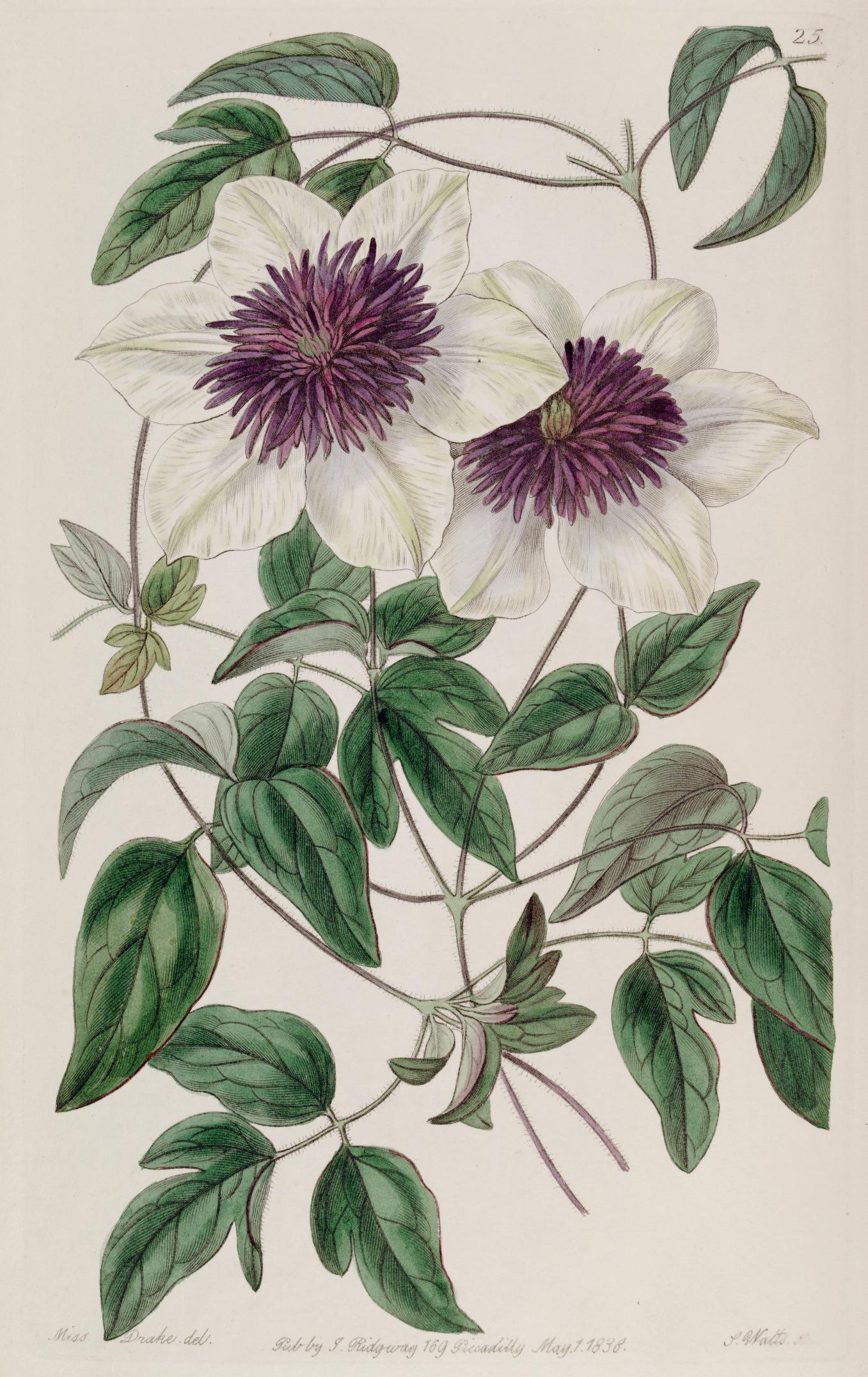
- Botanical illustration

Scientific classification
- Kingdom: Plantae
- Clade: Tracheophytes
- Clade: Angiosperms
- Clade: Eudicots
- Order: Ranunculales
- Family: Ranunculaceae
- Genus: Clematis
- Species: C. florida

Binomial name
- Clematis florida Thunb.

Synonyms
- List: Anemone japonica Houtt.; Atragene florida (Thunb.) Pers.; Atragene indica Desf.; Clematis anemonoides Houtt. ex Lavallée; Clematis bicolor (Lindl.) Heynh.; Clematis bracteata var. leptomera (Hance) Kuntze; Clematis cadmia var. leptomera (Hance) W.T.Wang; Clematis florida var. bicolor Lindl.; Clematis florida var. flore-plena G.Don; Clematis florida var. hakonensis (Franch. & Sav.) Huth; Clematis florida var. normalis Kuntze; Clematis florida var. plena D.Don; Clematis florida f. plena (D.Don) Rehder; Clematis florida var. sieboldiana C.Morren; Clematis florida var. sieboldii D.Don; Clematis florida f. sieboldii (D.Don) Rehder; Clematis florida var. simsii (Makino) Honda; Clematis florida var. violacea Lemoine ex T.Moore & Jackman; Clematis hakonensis Franch. & Sav.; Clematis japonica var. simsii Makino; Clematis japonica (Houtt.) Makino; Clematis leptomera Hance; Clematis plena Gressent; Clematis purpurea Gressent; Clematis sieboldii (D.Don) Paxton; Sieboldia bicolor Hoffmanns. ex Heynh.; Sieboldia florida (Thunb.) Hoffmanns. ex Heynh.; Viticella florida (Thunb.) Bercht. & J.Presl

= Clematis florida =

Species of plant

Clematis florida, the Asian virginsbower, or passion flower clematis, is a species of flowering plant in the family Ranunculaceae.

Clematis florida is native to southern China, specifically the provinces of Guangdong, northern Guangxi, Hubei, Hunan, western Jiangxi, southwestern Yunnan and Zhejiang, where it commonly grows amongst scrub, thickets and along streams at an elevation of around 1700 m. From China, Clematis florida has long been grown in Korea and Japan, where it can be found as cultivated plant in gardens, and in the wild.

It was introduced to gardens in Europe from plants cultivated in Japan in 1776, and formally described to modern botany by the Swedish botanist Carl Peter Thunberg in 1784. The wild, uncultivated plant was found by the Irish botanist Augustine Henry growing near Yichang (then known as Ichang) in the Chinese province of Hubei.

With a long history of cultivation, first in Japan, before introduction to European gardens, it is thought that most, if not all Clematis florida in cultivation outside of China descend from a long line of cultivars or variants, as opposed to the wild plant. Selections and cultivars available, some of which are commercially available, including the older cultivars 'Sieboldiana' and 'Plena' (also known as 'Alba Plena', and newer cultivars such as 'Pistachio' (also known as 'Evirida'), and 'Taiga'.

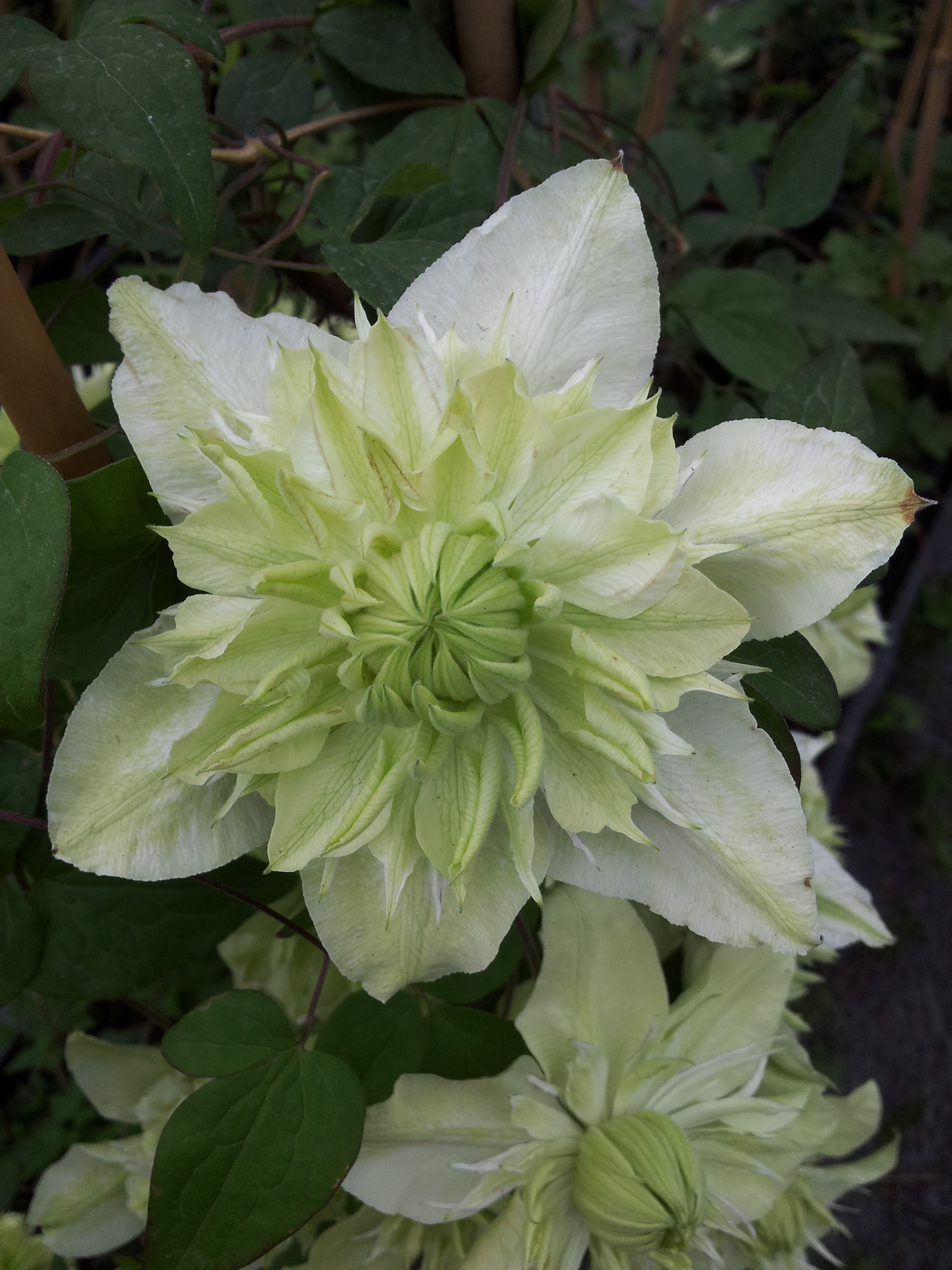
'Plena' aka 'Alba Plena'

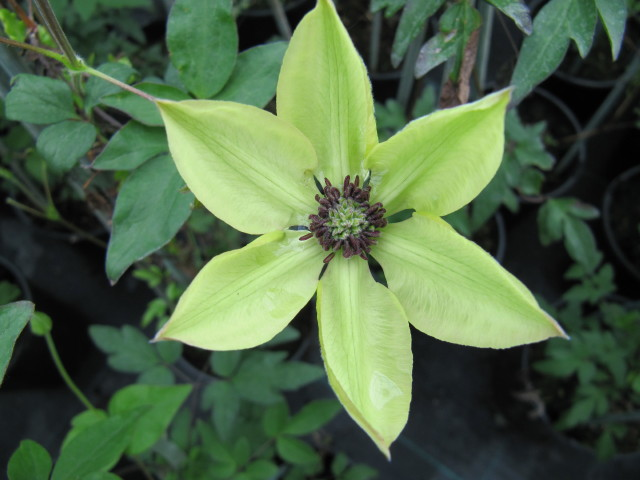
'Evirida' aka 'Pistachio'

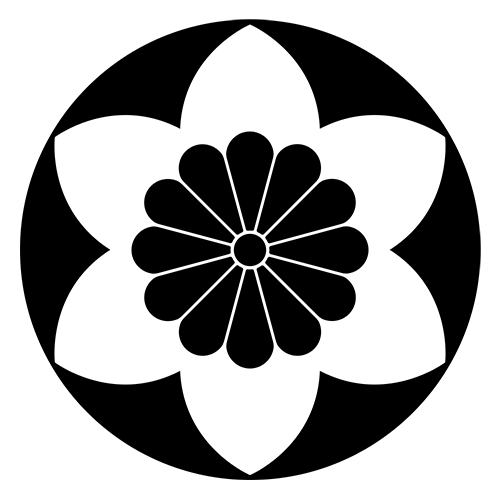
As the mon of the Japanese viscount Nagai
