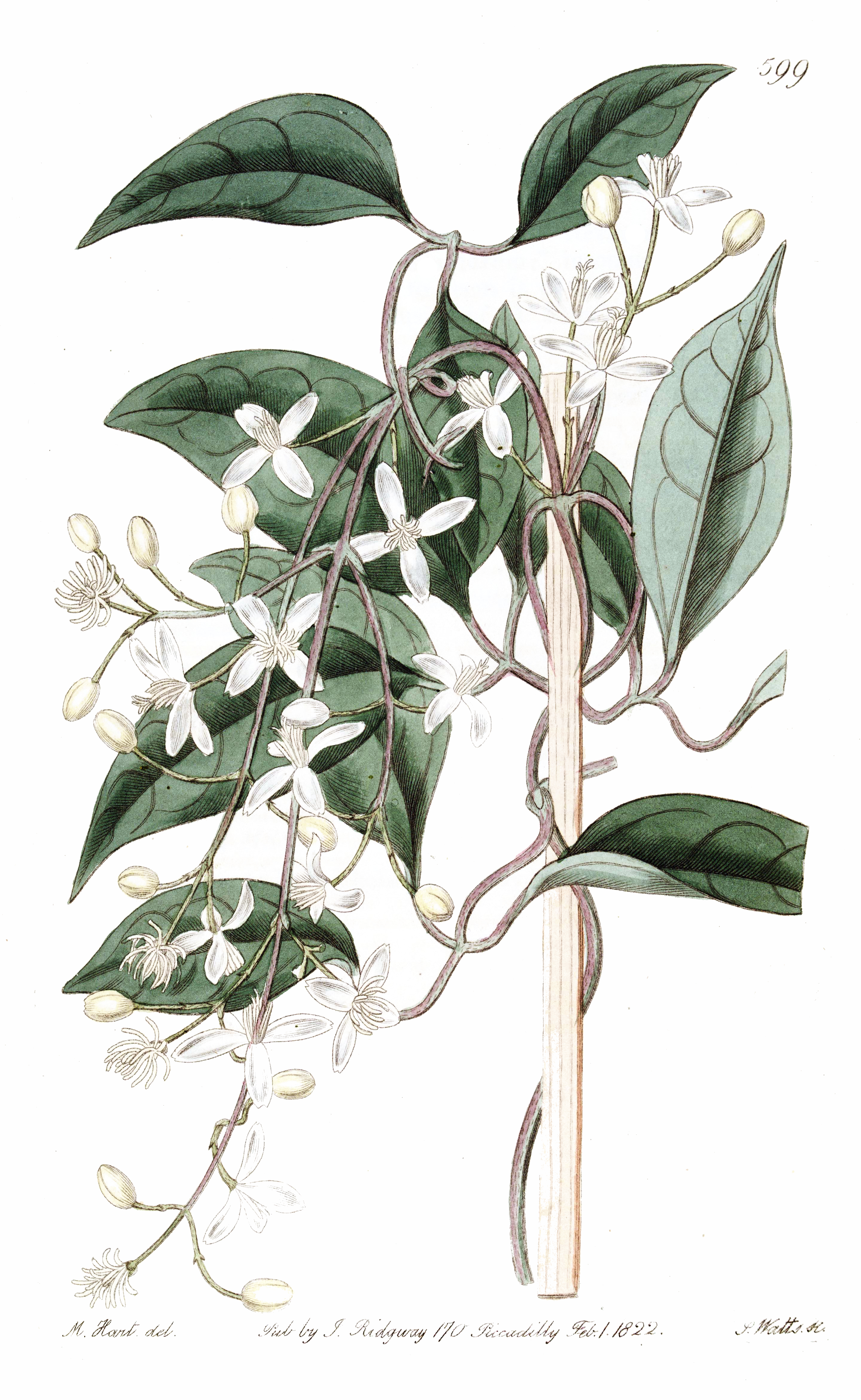

Scientific classification
- Kingdom: Plantae
- Clade: Tracheophytes
- Clade: Angiosperms
- Clade: Eudicots
- Order: Ranunculales
- Family: Ranunculaceae
- Genus: Clematis
- Species: C. hedysarifolia

Binomial name
- Clematis hedysarifolia DC.

= Clematis hedysarifolia =

Species of flowering plant in the buttercup family

Clematis hedysarifolia is a liana, endemic to peninsular India, belonging to the buttercup family (Ranunculaceae). It was described by Augustin Pyramus de Candolle and published in Regni Vegetabilis Systema Naturale 1: 148, in 1817.

== Description ==
It is a woody evergreen climber, with the following features:

- Branches - ribbed, roundish, thinly sprinkled with very fine soft hairs when young.
- Leaves - pinnate or bipinnate, opposite, in pairs alternately perpendicular, with wide intervals between the pairs, with 3 leaflets.
  - Petiole : purplish, slightly hairy, up to 9 cm long, sometimes twining.
  - Leaflets : leathery, green, glabrous, stalked, entire, ovate lanceolate, with acuminate apex, base rounded or cordate, strongly reticulate, .
- Inflorescence - Flower panicles are arise in leaf axils and at the end of branches, pendulous, many-flowered, branchlets stiff, decussately opposite and wide apart. Flower stalks are slender, hairy, bearing two small opposite abortive buds below their middle. Flowers are white, furred on the outside, about 1.6 cm across.
  - Flowers - yellowish-green to white, furred on the outside, about 1.6 cm across.
  - Sepals - 4, ovate, ovate-oblong, externally tomentose
  - Petals - 4, ovally oblong, equal, blunt, cruciately rotate.
  - Stamens - cream-coloured, upright, about 1/4 shorter than the petals, many, smooth.
  - Anthers - Compressed, threadlike filaments. Anthers of same color, linearly oblong, upright with a short obtuse point and a flattish receptacle.
  - Pistils - longer than the stamens, greenish.
- Fruit/Seeds - Achenes compressed, broadly elliptic or ovate, hairy, 5mm × 3mm.

Easily distinguished from the common Clematis gouriana, by the larger flowers and aristate (pointed) anthers.

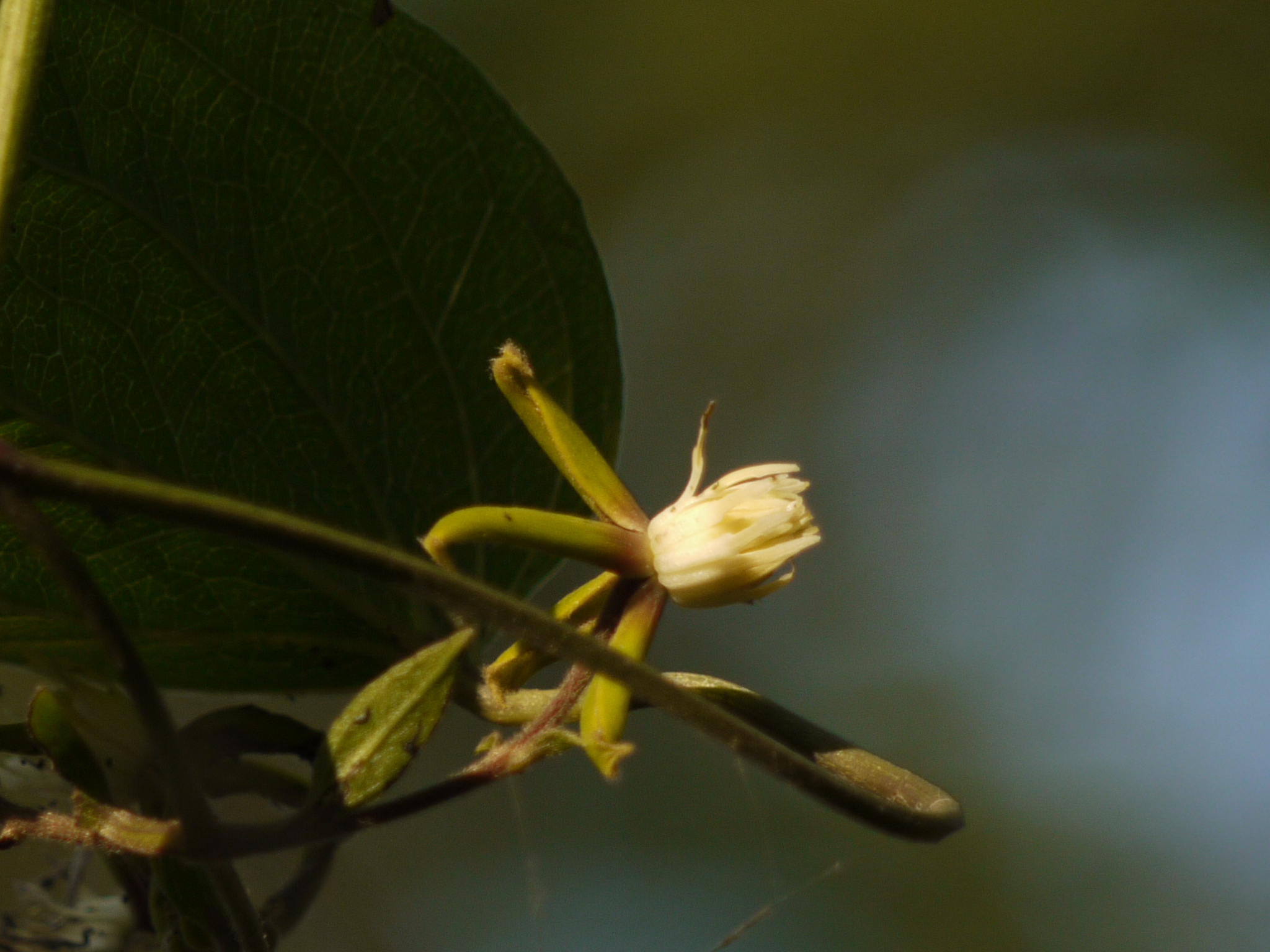
Flower

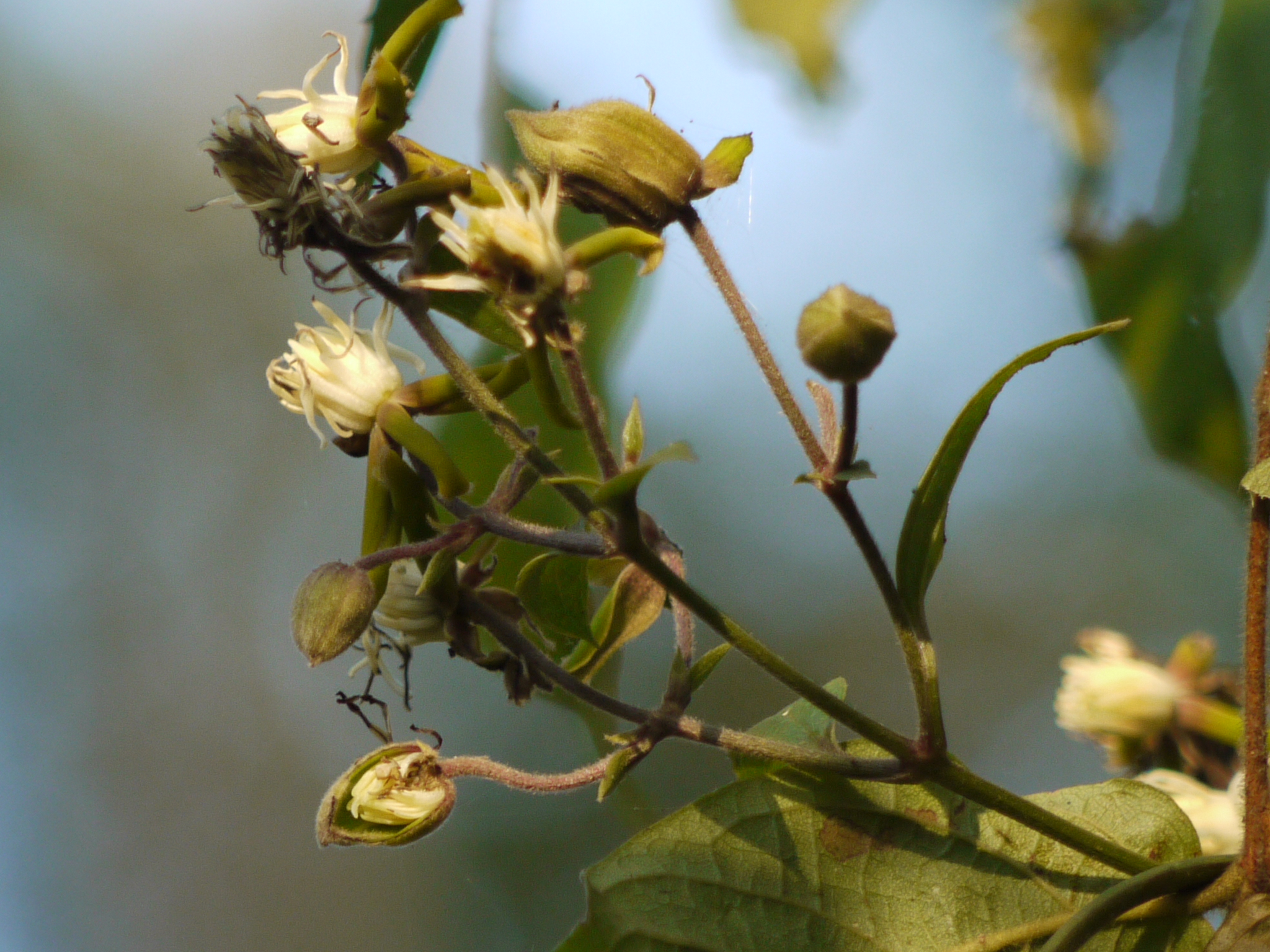
Flower pannicle

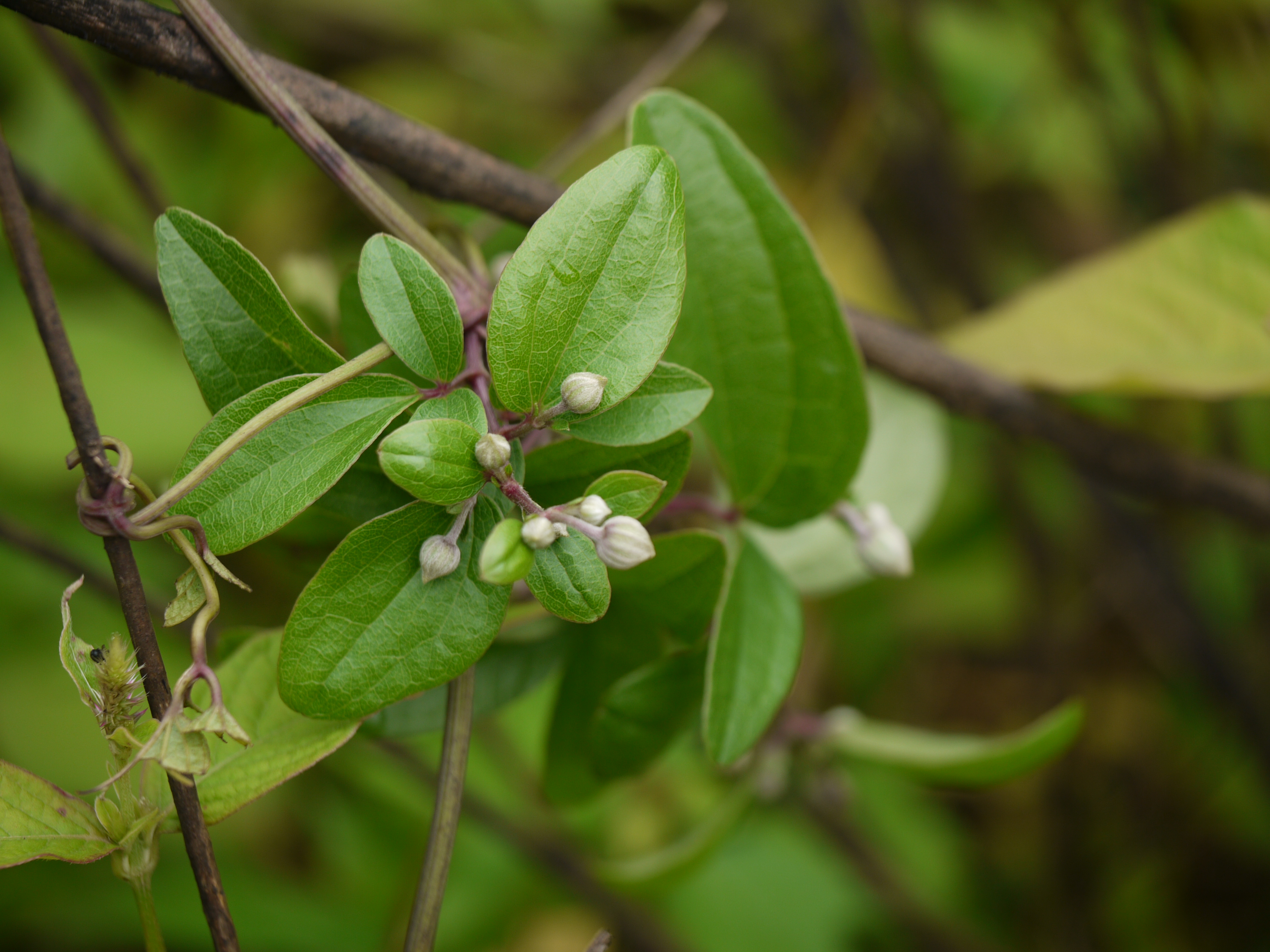
Tendrils, leaf stalk with buds

== Distribution ==
The species is endemic to India, and found in forests of Gujarat, Maharashtra, Goa, and Karnataka states. The creeper occurs in moist deciduous forests between the altitudes of 500–1500 m. Flowering is October–November, and fruiting is in December.
