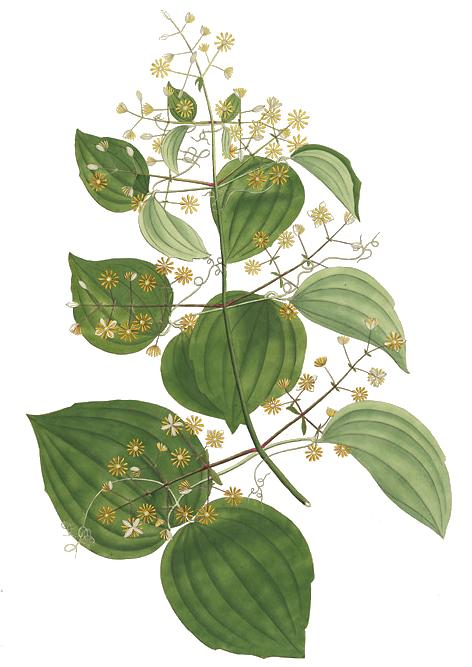

Scientific classification
- Kingdom: Plantae
- Clade: Tracheophytes
- Clade: Angiosperms
- Clade: Eudicots
- Order: Ranunculales
- Family: Ranunculaceae
- Genus: Clematis
- Species: C. zeylanica

Binomial name
- Clematis zeylanica (L.) Poir.

Synonyms
- Naravelia zeylanica (L.) DC.; Atragene zeylanica L.

= Clematis zeylanica =

Species of flowering plant in the buttercup family

Clematis zeylanica is a species of liana belonging to the family Ranunculaceae which is native to Asia. It was earlier classified as Naravelia zeylanica, but was renamed when molecular phylogenetic research revealed that the genus was nested in Clematis.

== Habitat ==
The native range of this species is the Indian Subcontinent to China and Indo-China. It grows primarily in the wet tropical biome. In Sri Lanka, its status has been assessed as near-threatened due to deforestation.
