= Clematis catesbyana =

Scientific classification
- Kingdom: Plantae
- Clade: Tracheophytes
- Clade: Angiosperms
- Clade: Eudicots
- Order: Ranunculales
- Family: Ranunculaceae
- Genus: Clematis
- Species: C. catesbyana

Binomial name
- Clematis catesbyana Pursh

Synonyms
- List: Clematis cordata Pursh; Clematis dioica subsp. catesbyana (Pursh) Kuntze; Clematis dioica subsp. cordata (Pursh) Kuntze; Clematis dioica var. variabilis Kuntze; Clematis micrantha Small; Clematis virginiana var. catesbyana (Pursh) Britton; Clematis virginiana var. cordata (Pursh) Kuntze

Species of flowering plant

Clematis catesbyana, commonly known as coastal virgin's-bower and satin curls, is a species of Clematis, found in the southeastern United States.

It grows in areas with dunes and interdune swales with abundant shell hash, calcareous woodlands, thickets, and glades, as well as calcareous hammocks. A sprawling vine, it has fragrant white flowers.
