= Inoculum =

In biology, inoculum (pl.: inocula) refers to the source material used for inoculation. Inoculum may refer to:

- In medicine, material that is the source of the inoculation in a vaccine
- In microbiology, propagules: cells, tissue, or viruses that are used to inoculate a new culture
- Microbial inoculant, the beneficial introduction of microbes to improve plant health
- A method of propagation of fungal plant disease transmission
- Fermentation starter, in food production

See also:

- Fear Inoculum, a 2019 album by American rock band Tool
