= List of Clematis species =

The following species in the flowering plant genus Clematis are accepted by Plants of the World Online. Although the genus is currently most diverse in warm temperate regions and mountainous habitats, molecular evidence suggests that this is of recent origin, and earlier diversification occurred in more tropical climes.

- Clematis acapulcensis Hook. & Arn.
- Clematis acerifolia Maxim.
- Clematis actinostemmatifolia W.T.Wang
- Clematis acuminata DC.
- Clematis acutangula Hook.f. & Thomson
- Clematis addisonii Britton ex Vail
- Clematis aethusifolia Turcz.
- Clematis affinis A.St.-Hil.
- Clematis afoliata Buchanan
- Clematis africolineariloba W.T.Wang
- Clematis akebioides (Maxim.) H.J.Veitch
- Clematis akoensis Hayata
- Clematis albicoma Wherry
- Clematis alborosea Ulbr.
- Clematis alpina (L.) Mill.
- Clematis alternata Kitam. & Tamura
- Clematis andersonii (C.B.Clarke ex Kunze) H.Eichler
- Clematis antonii (Elmer) L.Eichler
- Clematis apiculata Hook.f. & Thomson
- Clematis apiifolia DC.
- Clematis archboldiana Merr. & L.M.Perry
- Clematis aristata R.Br. ex Ker Gawl.
- Clematis armandi Franch.
- Clematis aureolata D.Falck & Lehtonen
- Clematis austroanatolica Ziel. & Kit Tan
- Clematis austrogansuensis W.T.Wang & L.Q.Li
- Clematis baldwinii Torr. & A.Gray
- Clematis baominiana W.T.Wang
- Clematis barbellata Edgew.
- Clematis bigelovii Torr.
- Clematis bojeri Hook.
- Clematis bonariensis Juss. ex DC.
- Clematis bourdillonii Dunn
- Clematis bowkeri Burtt Davy ex W.T.Wang
- Clematis brachiata Thunb.
- Clematis brachyura Maxim.
- Clematis bracteolata Tamura
- Clematis brasiliana DC.
- Clematis brevicaudata DC.
- Clematis brevipes Rehder
- Clematis buchananiana DC.
- Clematis burmanica Lace
- Clematis cadmia Buch.-Ham. ex Hook.f. & Thomson
- Clematis calcicola J.S.Kim
- Clematis caleoides Standl. & Steyerm.
- Clematis campaniflora Brot.
- Clematis campestris A.St.-Hil.
- Clematis carrizoensis D.Estes
- Clematis catesbyana Pursh
- Clematis caudigera W.T.Wang
- Clematis chaohuensis W.T.Wang & L.Q.Huang
- Clematis chekiangensis C.Pei
- Clematis chengguensis W.T.Wang
- Clematis chinensis Osbeck
- Clematis chingii W.T.Wang
- Clematis chiupehensis M.Y.Fang
- Clematis chrysocarpa Welw. ex Oliv.
- Clematis chrysocoma Franch.
- Clematis cinnamomoides W.T.Wang
- Clematis cirrhosa L.
- Clematis clarkeana H.Lév. & Vaniot
- Clematis clemensiae H.Eichler
- Clematis clitorioides DC.
- Clematis coactilis (Fernald) Keener
- Clematis coahuilensis D.J.Keil
- Clematis columbiana (Nutt.) Torr. & A.Gray
- Clematis commutata Kuntze
- Clematis comoresensis W.T.Wang
- Clematis connata DC.
- Clematis corniculata W.T.Wang
- Clematis courtoisii Hand.-Mazz.
- Clematis craibiana Lace
- Clematis crassifolia Benth.
- Clematis crassipes Chun & F.C.How
- Clematis crispa L.
- Clematis cruttwellii H.Eichler ex W.T.Wang
- Clematis cunninghamii Turcz.
- Clematis dasyandra Maxim.
- Clematis dasyoneura (Korth.) Kuntze
- Clematis decipiens H.Eichler ex Jeanes
- Clematis delavayi Franch.
- Clematis delicata H.Eichler ex W.T.Wang
- Clematis diebuensis W.T.Wang
- Clematis dilatata C.Pei
- Clematis dimorphophylla W.T.Wang
- Clematis dingjunshanica W.T.Wang
- Clematis dioica L.
- Clematis dissecta Baker
- Clematis dolichopoda Brenan
- Clematis drummondii Torr. & A.Gray
- Clematis dubia (Endl.) P.S.Green
- Clematis elata Bureau & Franch.
- Clematis elisabethae-carolae Greuter
- Clematis elobata (S.X.Yan) S.X.Yan & L.Xie
- Clematis erectisepala L.Xie, J.H.Shi & L.Q.Li
- Clematis falciformis H.Perrier
- Clematis fasciculiflora Franch.
- Clematis fawcettii F.Muell.
- Clematis fengii W.T.Wang
- Clematis finetiana H.Lév. & Vaniot
- Clematis flammula L.
- Clematis flammulastrum Griseb.
- Clematis flavidonitida W.T.Wang
- Clematis florida Thunb.
- Clematis foetida Raoul
- Clematis formosana Kuntze
- Clematis forsteri J.F.Gmel.
- Clematis fremontii S.Watson
- Clematis fruticosa Turcz.
- Clematis fulvicoma Rehder & E.H.Wilson
- Clematis fulvofurfuracea W.T.Wang
- Clematis fusca Turcz.
- Clematis gentianoides DC.
- Clematis gialaiensis Serov
- Clematis glauca Willd.
- Clematis glaucophylla Small
- Clematis glycinoides DC.
- Clematis gouriana Roxb. ex DC.
- Clematis gracilifolia Rehder & E.H.Wilson
- Clematis grahamii Benth.
- Clematis grandidentata (Rehder & E.H.Wilson) W.T.Wang
- Clematis grandiflora DC.
- Clematis grandifolia (Staner & J.Léonard) M.Johnson
- Clematis grata Wall.
- Clematis gratopsis W.T.Wang
- Clematis graveolens Lindl.
- Clematis grewiiflora DC.
- Clematis grossa Benth.
- Clematis guadeloupae Pers.
- Clematis gulinensis W.T.Wang & L.Q.Li
- Clematis guniuensis W.Y.Ni, R.B.Wang & S.B.Zhou
- Clematis haenkeana C.Presl
- Clematis hagiangensis N.T.Do
- Clematis hancockiana Maxim.
- Clematis hastata Finet & Gagnep.
- Clematis hayatae Kudô & Masam.
- Clematis hedysarifolia DC.
- Clematis heracleifolia DC.
- Clematis herrei H.Eichler
- Clematis hexapetala Pall.
- Clematis heynei M.A.Rau
- Clematis hilariae Kovalevsk.
- Clematis hirsuta Perr. & Guill.
- Clematis hirsutissima Pursh
- Clematis horripilata D.Falck & Lehtonen
- Clematis hothae Kurz
- Clematis huangjingensis W.T.Wang & L.Q.Li
- Clematis huchouensis Tamura
- Clematis hupehensis Hemsl. & E.H.Wilson
- Clematis ibarensis Baker
- Clematis incisodenticulata W.T.Wang
- Clematis insidiosa Baill.
- Clematis integrifolia L.
- Clematis intraglabra W.T.Wang
- Clematis intricata Bunge
- Clematis iranica Habibi, Ghorbani & Azizian
- Clematis ispahanica Boiss.
- Clematis japonica Thunb.
- Clematis javana DC.
- Clematis jeypurensis Bedd. ex W.T.Wang
- Clematis jialasaensis W.T.Wang
- Clematis jingdungensis W.T.Wang
- Clematis jingxiensis W.T.Wang
- Clematis kakoulimensis Schnell
- Clematis khasiana (Brühl) W.T.Wang
- Clematis kirilowii Maxim.
- Clematis kockiana C.K.Schneid.
- Clematis koreana Kom.
- Clematis korthalsii H.Eichler
- Clematis kweichouwensis C.Pei
- Clematis ladakhiana Grey-Wilson
- Clematis lancifolia Bureau & Franch.
- Clematis lanuginosa Lindl.
- Clematis lasiandra Maxim.
- Clematis lasiantha Nutt.
- Clematis lathyrifolia Besser ex Trautv.
- Clematis latisecta (Maxim.) Prantl
- Clematis laxistrigosa (W.T.Wang & M.C.Chang) W.T.Wang
- Clematis leptophylla (F.Muell.) H.Eichler
- Clematis leschenaultiana DC.
- Clematis liboensis Z.R.Xu
- Clematis ligusticifolia Nutt.
- Clematis linearifolia Steud.
- Clematis linearifoliola W.T.Wang
- Clematis lingyunensis W.T.Wang
- Clematis lishanensis (T.Y.A.Yang & T.C.Huang) Luferov
- Clematis liuzhouensis Y.G.Wei & C.R.Lin
- Clematis longicauda Steud. ex A.Rich.
- Clematis longipes Freyn
- Clematis longistyla Hand.-Mazz.
- Clematis loureiroana DC.
- Clematis lushuiensis W.T.Wang
- Clematis macgregorii Merr.
- Clematis macropetala Ledeb.
- Clematis macrophylla (J.Raynal) W.T.Wang
- Clematis mae Z.Z.Yang & L.Xie
- Clematis maguanensis W.T.Wang
- Clematis malacoclada W.T.Wang
- Clematis malacocoma W.T.Wang
- Clematis manipurensis (Brühl) W.T.Wang
- Clematis marata Armstr.
- Clematis marmoraria Sneddon
- Clematis mashanensis W.T.Wang
- Clematis mauritiana Lam.
- Clematis melanonema W.T.Wang
- Clematis menglaensis M.C.Chang
- Clematis methifolia Hook.
- Clematis metouensis M.Y.Fang
- Clematis meyeniana Walp.
- Clematis microcuspis Baker
- Clematis microphylla DC.
- Clematis millefoliolata Eichler
- Clematis moisseenkoi (Serov) W.T.Wang
- Clematis mollissima (Hallier f.) H.Eichler
- Clematis montana Buch.-Ham. ex DC.
- Clematis morefieldii Kral
- Clematis morii Hayata
- Clematis multistriata H.Eichler
- Clematis munroiana Wight
- Clematis nagaensis W.T.Wang
- Clematis nainitalensis W.T.Wang
- Clematis nannophylla Maxim.
- Clematis napaulensis DC.
- Clematis napoensis W.T.Wang
- Clematis ningjingshanica W.T.Wang
- Clematis nobilis Nakai
- Clematis novocaledoniaensis W.T.Wang
- Clematis nukiangensis M.Y.Fang
- Clematis obscura Maxim.
- Clematis obvallata (Ohwi) Tamura
- Clematis occidentalis (Hornem.) DC.
- Clematis ochroleuca Aiton
- Clematis oligophylla Hook.
- Clematis orientalis L.
- Clematis otophora Franch. ex Finet & Gagnep.
- Clematis oweniae Harv.
- Clematis pamiralaica Grey-Wilson
- Clematis paniculata J.F.Gmel.
- Clematis papillosa H.Eichler
- Clematis papuasica Merr. & L.M.Perry
- Clematis parviloba Gardner & Champ.
- Clematis pashanensis (M.C.Chang) W.T.Wang
- Clematis patens C.Morren & Decne.
- Clematis pauciflora Nutt.
- Clematis peii L.Xie, W.J.Yang & L.Q.Li
- Clematis perrieri H.Lév.
- Clematis peruviana DC.
- Clematis peterae Hand.-Mazz.
- Clematis petriei Allan
- Clematis pettimudiensis K.M.P.Kumar, R.Jagad. & G.Prasad
- Clematis phanerophlebia Merr. & L.M.Perry
- Clematis phlebantha L.H.J.Williams
- Clematis pianmaensis W.T.Wang
- Clematis pickeringii A.Gray
- Clematis pierotii Miq.
- Clematis pimpinellifolia Hook.
- Clematis pinchuanensis W.T.Wang & M.Y.Fang
- Clematis pingbianensis W.T.Wang
- Clematis pinnata Maxim.
- Clematis pitcheri Torr. & A.Gray
- Clematis plukenetii DC.
- Clematis pogonandra Maxim.
- Clematis polygama Jacq.
- Clematis populifolia Turcz.
- Clematis potaninii Maxim.
- Clematis pseudoconnata (Kuntze) Luferov
- Clematis pseudootophora M.Y.Fang
- Clematis pseudopogonandra Finet & Gagnep.
- Clematis pseudopterantha Kadota & Nob.Tanaka
- Clematis pseudoscabiosifolia H.Perrier
- Clematis psilandra Kitag.
- Clematis pterantha Dunn
- Clematis puberula Hook.f. & Thomson
- Clematis pubescens Hügel ex Endl.
- Clematis pycnocoma W.T.Wang
- Clematis qingchengshanica W.T.Wang
- Clematis quadribracteolata Colenso
- Clematis queenslandica W.T.Wang
- Clematis quinquefoliolata Hutch.
- Clematis ranunculoides Franch.
- Clematis recta L.
- Clematis rehderiana Craib
- Clematis repens Finet & Gagnep.
- Clematis reticulata Walter
- Clematis rhodocarpa Rose
- Clematis rhodocarpoides W.T.Wang
- Clematis rigoi W.T.Wang
- Clematis robertsiana Aitch. & Hemsl.
- Clematis roylei Rehder
- Clematis rubifolia C.H.Wright
- Clematis rufa Rose
- Clematis rutoides W.T.Wang
- Clematis sarezica Ikonn.
- Clematis satomiana Kadota
- Clematis sclerophylla W.T.Wang
- Clematis serratifolia Rehder
- Clematis shenlungchiaensis M.Y.Fang
- Clematis shensiensis W.T.Wang
- Clematis siamensis Drumm. & Craib
- Clematis sibiricoides Nakai
- Clematis sichotealinensis Ulanova
- Clematis simensis Fresen.
- Clematis sinii W.T.Wang
- Clematis smilacifolia Wall.
- Clematis socialis Kral
- Clematis songorica Bunge
- Clematis spathulifolia (Kuntze) Prantl
- Clematis speciosa (Makino) Makino
- Clematis staintonii W.T.Wang
- Clematis stans Siebold & Zucc.
- Clematis stenanthera H.Eichler
- Clematis strigillosa Baker
- Clematis subtriloba Nees ex G.Don
- Clematis subtriternata Nakai
- Clematis subumbellata Kurz
- Clematis takedana Makino
- Clematis tamurae T.Y.A.Yang & T.C.Huang
- Clematis tangutica (Maxim.) Korsh.
- Clematis tashiroi Maxim.
- Clematis tengchongensis W.T.Wang
- Clematis tenuimarginata H.Eichler
- Clematis tenuipes W.T.Wang
- Clematis teretipes W.T.Wang
- Clematis terniflora DC.
- Clematis teuszii (Kuntze) Engl.
- Clematis texensis Buckley
- Clematis thaiana Tamura
- Clematis thaimontana Tamura
- Clematis thalictrifolia Engl.
- Clematis theobromina Dunn
- Clematis tibetana Kuntze
- Clematis tinghuensis C.T.Ting
- Clematis tomentella (Maxim.) W.T.Wang & L.Q.Li
- Clematis tongluensis (Brühl) Tamura
- Clematis tortuosa Wall. ex C.E.C.Fisch.
- Clematis tosaensis Makino
- Clematis tournefortii DC.
- Clematis trichotoma Nakai
- Clematis triloba Thunb.
- Clematis tripartita W.T.Wang
- Clematis tsaii W.T.Wang
- Clematis tsugetorum Ohwi
- Clematis tuaensis H.Eichler ex W.T.Wang
- Clematis tunisiatica W.T.Wang
- Clematis turyusanensis U.C.La & Chae G.Chen
- Clematis udayanii Anilkumar
- Clematis uhehensis Engl.
- Clematis ulbrichiana Pilg.
- Clematis uncinata Champ. ex Benth.
- Clematis urophylla Franch.
- Clematis uruboensis Lourteig
- Clematis vaniotii H.Lév. & C.E.Porter
- Clematis variifolia W.T.Wang
- Clematis venusta M.C.Chang
- Clematis versicolor Small
- Clematis vietnamensis W.T.Wang & N.T.Do
- Clematis villosa DC.
- Clematis vinacea Floden
- Clematis viorna L.
- Clematis virginiana L.
- Clematis viridiflora Bertol.
- Clematis viridis (W.T.Wang & M.C.Chang) W.T.Wang
- Clematis vitalba L.
- Clematis viticaulis Steele
- Clematis viticella L.
- Clematis wallichii W.T.Wang
- Clematis wangiana Mabb.
- Clematis wenshanensis W.T.Wang
- Clematis wenxianensis W.T.Wang
- Clematis wightiana Wall. ex Wight & Arn.
- Clematis williamsii A.Gray
- Clematis wissmanniana Hand.-Mazz.
- Clematis wuxiensis Q.Q.Jiang & H.P.Deng
- Clematis xiangguiensis W.T.Wang
- Clematis xinhuiensis R.J.Wang
- Clematis yuanjiangensis W.T.Wang
- Clematis yui W.T.Wang
- Clematis yunnanensis Franch.
- Clematis yuntaishanica W.T.Wang
- Clematis zaireensis W.T.Wang
- Clematis zandaensis W.T.Wang
- Clematis zemuensis W.W.Sm.
- Clematis zeylanica (L.) Poir.
- Clematis zygophylla Hand.-Mazz.
