= C. crispa =

C. crispa may refer to:

- Chloraea crispa, an orchid species in the genus Chloraea
- Clematis crispa, a climbing plant species in the genus Clematis
- Clethra crispa, a plant species in the genus Clethra native to northwestern South America
- Cousinia crispa, a sunflower species in the genus Cousinia
- Cryptogramma crispa, a fern species
- Cyanea crispa, a plant species endemic to Hawaii
- Cyathula crispa, a flowering plant species in the genus Cyathula

== See also ==
- Crispa (disambiguation)
