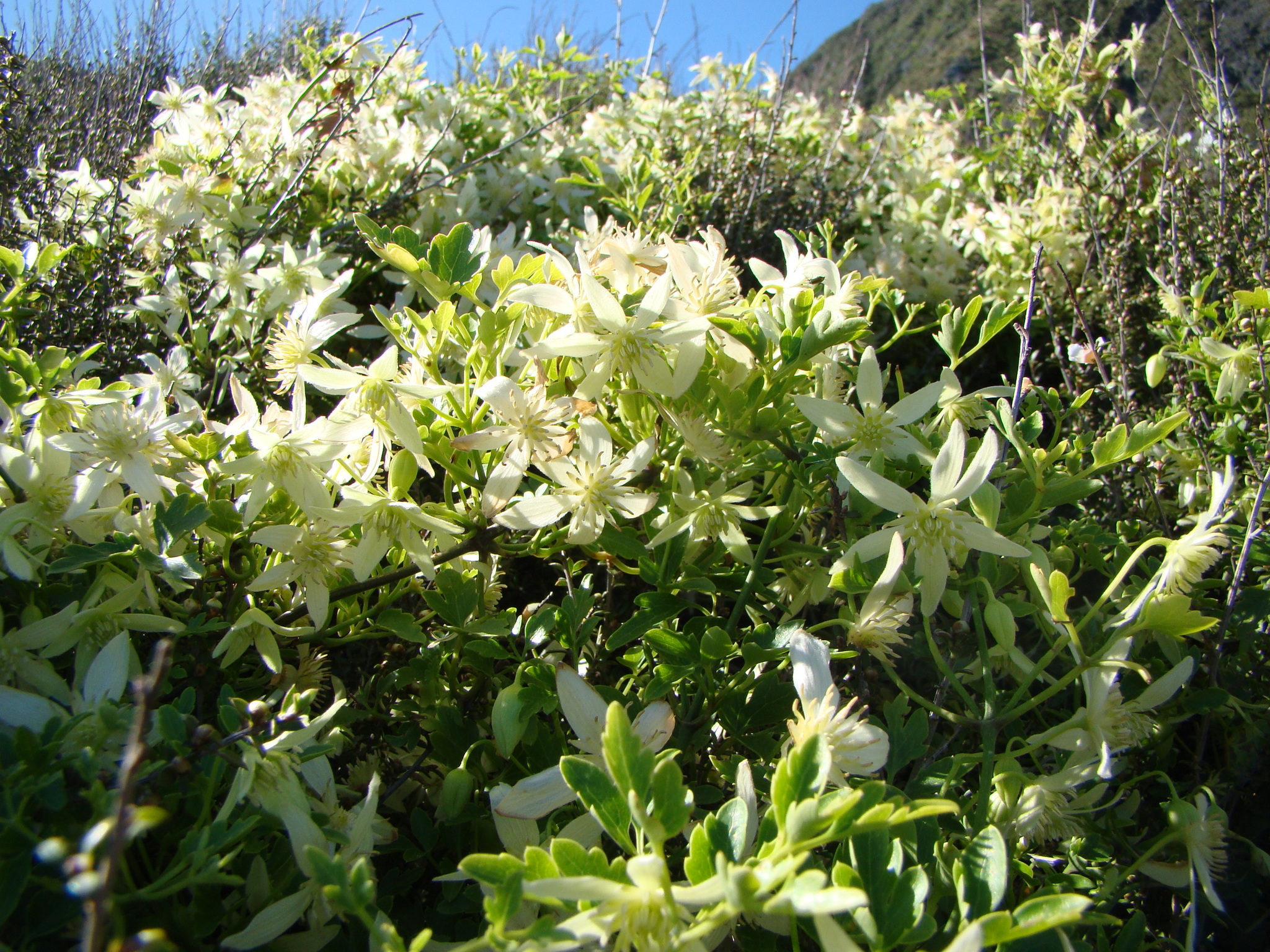
- Clematis forsteri on Cape Palliser

Conservation status
- Not Threatened (NZ TCS)

Scientific classification
- Kingdom: Plantae
- Clade: Tracheophytes
- Clade: Angiosperms
- Clade: Eudicots
- Order: Ranunculales
- Family: Ranunculaceae
- Genus: Clematis
- Species: C. forsteri

Binomial name
- Clematis forsteri J.F.Gmel.

= Clematis forsteri =

Species of flowering plant

Clematis forsteri, the Forster's clematis, pōānanga, small white clematis, or pikiarero, is a species of flowering plant that is endemic to New Zealand.

== Description ==
This clematis is a woody vine that grows well over other bushes, and which has creamy yellow-white flowers. The flowers are present from September to March, and are followed by fruits. The flowers are in triplets.

It can be distinguished from Clematis paniculata by its smaller flowers; from Clematis foetida and C. cunninghamii by the lack of brownish hairs on C. forsteri; and from Clematis petriei by the yellow-green, evenly coloured, and mostly hairless nature of the top of the sepals.

== Distribution and habitat ==
This species is known from both the North and South Island, south of Auckland and north of Canterbury. It can be found in lowland forests, often on the margins or where there is light, such as in streamsides or brush.

== Ecology ==
Birds are known to use its nectar. The plant can also provide shelter for native lizards.

== Etymology ==
Forsteri is named after Johann R. and Johann G.A. Forster.

== Human uses ==
The flowers were used in headdresses. This plant was known by many different names in the Māori language.

The plant stems were also used as a binding agent with clay in the fortification of pā. Walls made of such material were called koperu or parihi.

The leaves and sap were used for blisters, both by humans and for chafing of horses' fetlocks.
