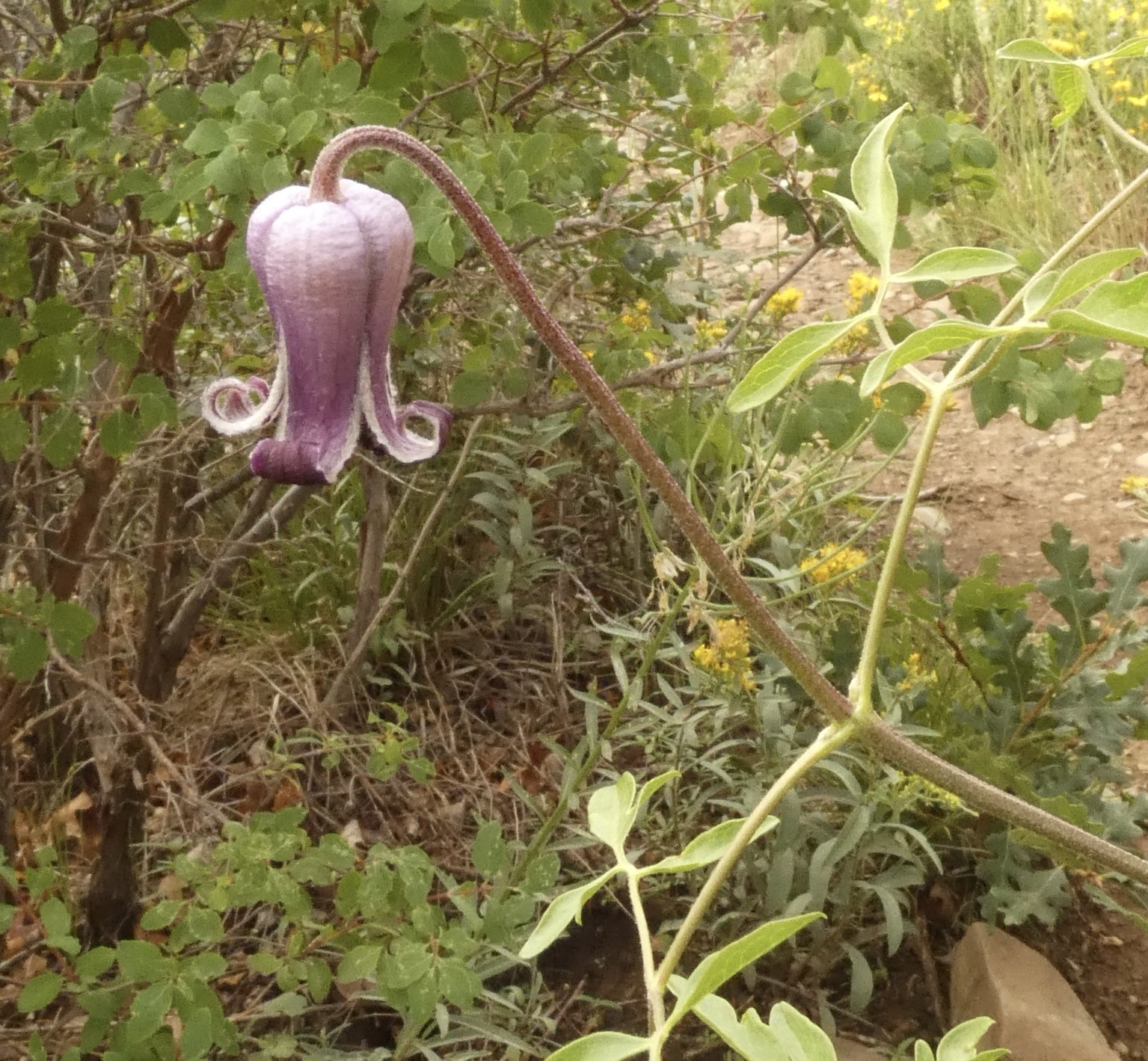

Conservation status
- Apparently Secure (NatureServe)

Scientific classification
- Kingdom: Plantae
- Clade: Tracheophytes
- Clade: Angiosperms
- Clade: Eudicots
- Order: Ranunculales
- Family: Ranunculaceae
- Genus: Clematis
- Species: C. bigelovii

Binomial name
- Clematis bigelovii Torr.

Synonyms
- Clematis douglasii var. bigelovii (Torr.) M.E.Jones; Clematis palmeri Rose; Clematis pitcheri var. bigelovii (Torr.) B.L.Rob.; Coriflora bigelovii (Torr.) W.A.Weber; Coriflora palmeri (Rose) W.A.Weber; Viorna bigelovii (Torr.) A.Heller; Viorna palmeri (Rose) Wooton & Standl.

= Clematis bigelovii =

Species of flowering plant

Clematis bigelovii, common name Bigelow's clematis, is a perennial climbing plant in the family Ranunculaceae. It grows to approximately 2 feet (61 centimeters) in height with purple, solitary, bell-shaped flowers. It is native in Arizona and New Mexico and can be found in woodlands and rocky areas.

== Description ==
Clematis bigelovii is a perennial vine that grows to approximately 2 feet (61 centimeters) in height. Its stems are either erect or twining and sprawling. Leaves are pinnate with 7–11 leaflets. The flowers are terminal, solitary, and bell-shaped. Their sepals are purple, lanceolate, and often with white woolly margins. Clematis bigelovii can flower from March to November.

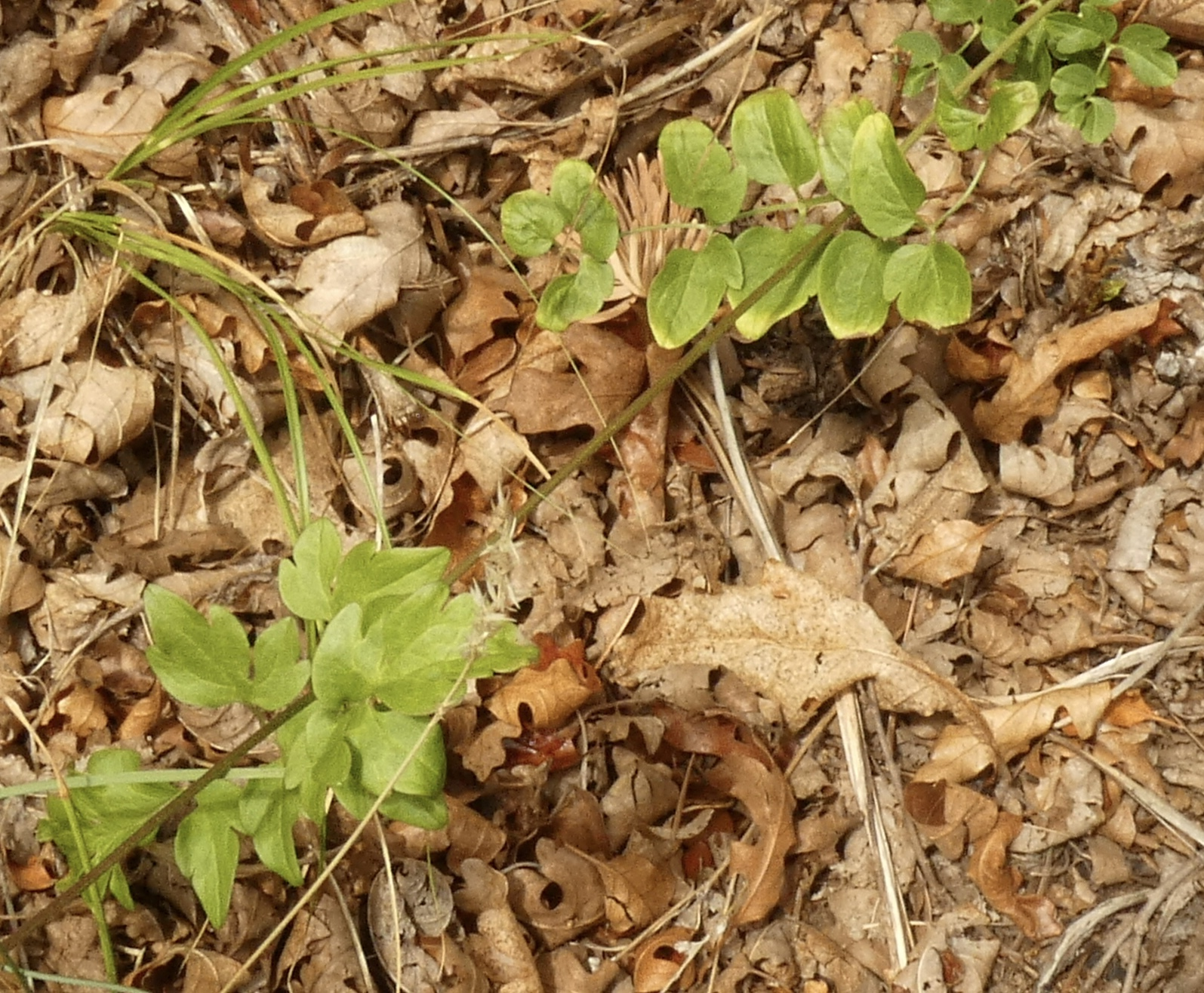

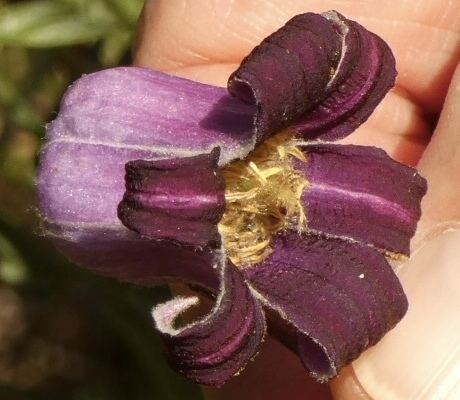

== Distribution and habitat ==
Clematis bigelovii has been reported from central to western New Mexico at elevations up to 4,500–5,500 feet (1,400–1,700 meters), occurring in canyons, and from eastern Arizona to 5,000 ft (1,500 m). It thrives in grassland, mountainous areas, and damp, rocky areas as well as pinyon–juniper woodlands to upper mixed conifer forests.

== Conservation ==
As of October 2024, NatureServe listed Clematis bigelovii as Apparently Secure (G4) globally, with no status information for either Arizona or New Mexico. The species' global status was last reviewed on 8 May 1991.
