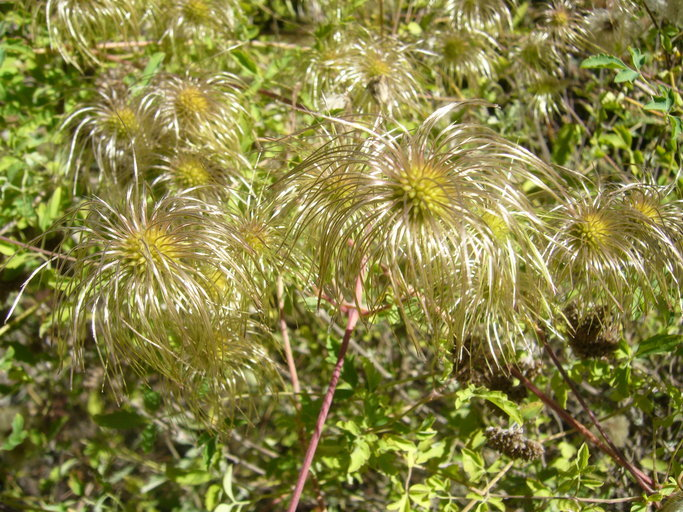
- Clematis akebioides prior to flowering

Scientific classification
- Kingdom: Plantae
- Clade: Tracheophytes
- Clade: Angiosperms
- Clade: Eudicots
- Order: Ranunculales
- Family: Ranunculaceae
- Genus: Clematis
- Species: C. akebioides

Binomial name
- Clematis akebioides (Maxim.) H.J.Veitch

Synonyms
- Homotypic Synonyms: Clematis glauca var. akebioides (Maxim.) Rehder & E.H.Wilson; Clematis orientalis var. akebioides Maxim.

= Clematis akebioides =

Species of vine

Clematis akebioides is a species of flowering plant in the family Ranunculaceae. It is native to China and Mongolia. It comes in many different colors, but is mainly greenish yellow. It contains certain chemical constituents that are widely used in western medicine. The species usually grows in shrub lands where it uses its stems to provide support for other plants.

== Distribution ==
Clematis akebioides is found mainly in Western China. They are found in Gansu, West Nei Mongol, Qinghai, West Sichuan, East to Southeast Xizang, and the Yunnan providence. It is also found in parts of Canada. The plant has been found to be endemic to 7 different geographical regions of China, while other members of the Ranunculaceae family are only endemic to 4-5 of the geographical regions. These 7 geographical regions are the humid region and temperate zones, the humid and warm temperate region, the humid and subtropical zone, the humid and tropical zone, the temperate grassland region, the temperate and warm deserts and the Qinghai-Tibet alpine and cold region.

== Habitat and ecology ==
Clematis akebioides likes to reside in shrublands, grassy slopes, and along streams. They are usually found 1200 to 3600 meters from a stream. The plant has a perennial life cycle (lasting or existing for long time). It is collected in the Yunnan province where it can grow up to 10 to 15 feet in height. It has interactions with many species of bees. Mainly Bombus friseanus, Bombus richardsi and Bombus lucorum pollinates C. akebioides, the main pollinator being Bobus richardsi. It is also pollinated by various species of butterflies. This species can tolerate partial shade and complete sunlight. It flowers mainly in late summer or early fall and during rainy seasons.

== Morphology ==
The plant is greenish yellow in color, but it can sometimes be a tinged purple color. It has a bell-shaped flower with a diameter of roughly 2 inches. The petals of the flower are roughly 2.5 to 7 cm in diameter. The plant produces nectar at the base of the filament and has woody vines with shallow, grooved branches. These branches can be puberulous (hairy branches) or subglabrous (not hairy). The leaves of C. akebioides can have either 1 or 2 pinnae. It also has petioles that are 3 to 7.8 cm in size. Leaflet blades of Clematis akebioides can be ovate, elliptic or oblong in shape and are 1.2–4 cm by 0.6–3 cm in size, which can range from paper thin to herbaceous. The anthers of the plant dehisce from outer to inner. The pedicel of this species can be sparsely puberulous or subglabrous, style is 7–12 mm in size and is villous. The stamen can be 7–12 mm long and be oblong in shape. Both the stamen and ovaries are pubescent.

== Reproduction ==
Clematis akebioides produces a yellow-orange flower which contains 4 sepals. The sepals of Clematis akebioides have a narrow ovate to ovate-oblong shape. It is roughly 1.6 cm in length and 0.6 cm in width. The stamen is roughly 7–12 mm long. C. akebioides is an autogamous plant, it self pollinates. The plant contains both the pistil and the stamen. The plant can change between self pollinating and facilitate pollinating on different lineages. C. akebioides is also a protogynous plant, meaning the female reproductive organ matures before the male reproductive organ. In addition to self pollinating, C. akebioides also gets pollinated by bumblebees. By combining both self pollination and bumblebee pollination, C. akebioides has a very high pollination success rate.

== Chemical properties ==
Clematis akebioides contains 3 different types compounds. These compounds are 2 benzenoids, 1 monoterpene glycoside and 15 triterpenoid saponins. This is the second report of the monoterpene glycoside. Scientists believe that this compound can be used to distinguish the genus Clematis. Furthermore, these 3 different compounds are found in solely in Clematis akebioides, this can help scientist distinguish C. akebioides from other species in its genus. The isolated chemicals can also provide new chemical markers on the genus Clematis as a whole. The two benzenoids isolated in the C. akebioides chemical makeup are the first benzenoids to be discovered in the Ranunculaceae family. They were found in the aerial part of the plant. The chemicals in the aboveground plant parts of C. akebioides were only recently isolated in a 2019 study. The newfound information is said to allow evidence for future chemotaxonomic studies of the plant.

== Usage ==
Clematis akebioides has many traditional medicinal uses. The plant is used in Western China to treat dysuria, Rheumatoid arthritis, wind chills, indigestion, pain, infection and to improve blood circulation. It is used by the many groups of people in China including: Bai, Jingpo, Lisu, Tibetan, and other Asian minorities groups. The Clematis genus has been used in Western China in traditional medicine since the beginning of Chinese civilization. Most of the Clematis species all share similar chemical constituents that serve the same function.
