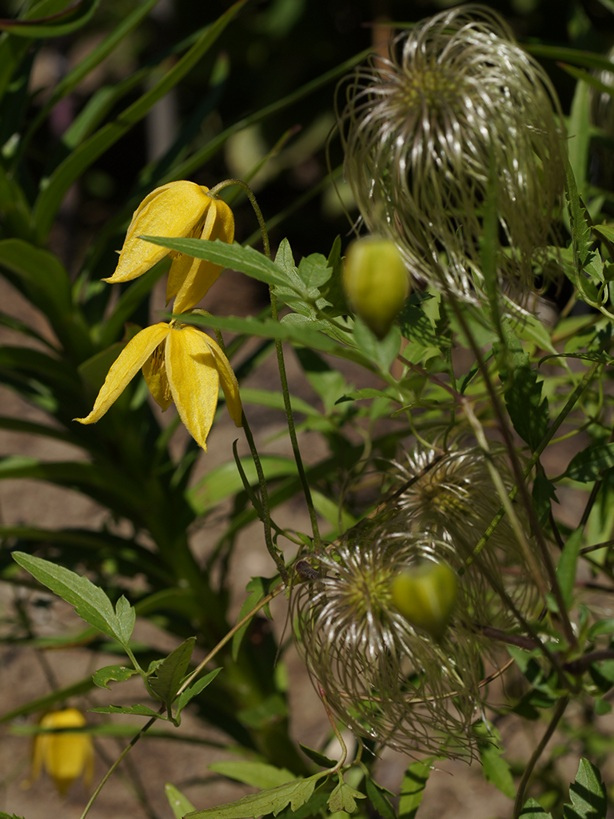
- Flowers and developing achene fruits

Scientific classification
- Kingdom: Plantae
- Clade: Tracheophytes
- Clade: Angiosperms
- Clade: Eudicots
- Order: Ranunculales
- Family: Ranunculaceae
- Genus: Clematis
- Species: C. tangutica

Binomial name
- Clematis tangutica (Maxim.) Korsh.

Synonyms
- List: Clematis atragenoides Batalin; Clematis chrysantha Ulbr.; Clematis eriopoda Maxim.; Clematis tangutica var. mongolica (Grey-Wilson) W.T.Wang; Clematis tangutica subsp. obtusiuscula (Rehder & E.H.Wilson) Grey-Wilson

= Clematis tangutica =

Species of flowering plant

Clematis tangutica, the golden clematis, is a species of flowering plant in the family Ranunculaceae. It is found from Central Asia through to most of China, and it has been introduced to western Canada, Czechia, Slovakia, Switzerland, and the South Island of New Zealand. Its cultivars 'Bill MacKenzie' and 'Lambton Park', both members of the Tangutica Group, have gained the Royal Horticultural Society's Award of Garden Merit.

== Subtaxa ==
The following subtaxa are accepted:

- Clematis tangutica subsp. mongolica Grey-Wilson
- Clematis tangutica var. pubescens M.C.Chang & P.P.Ling
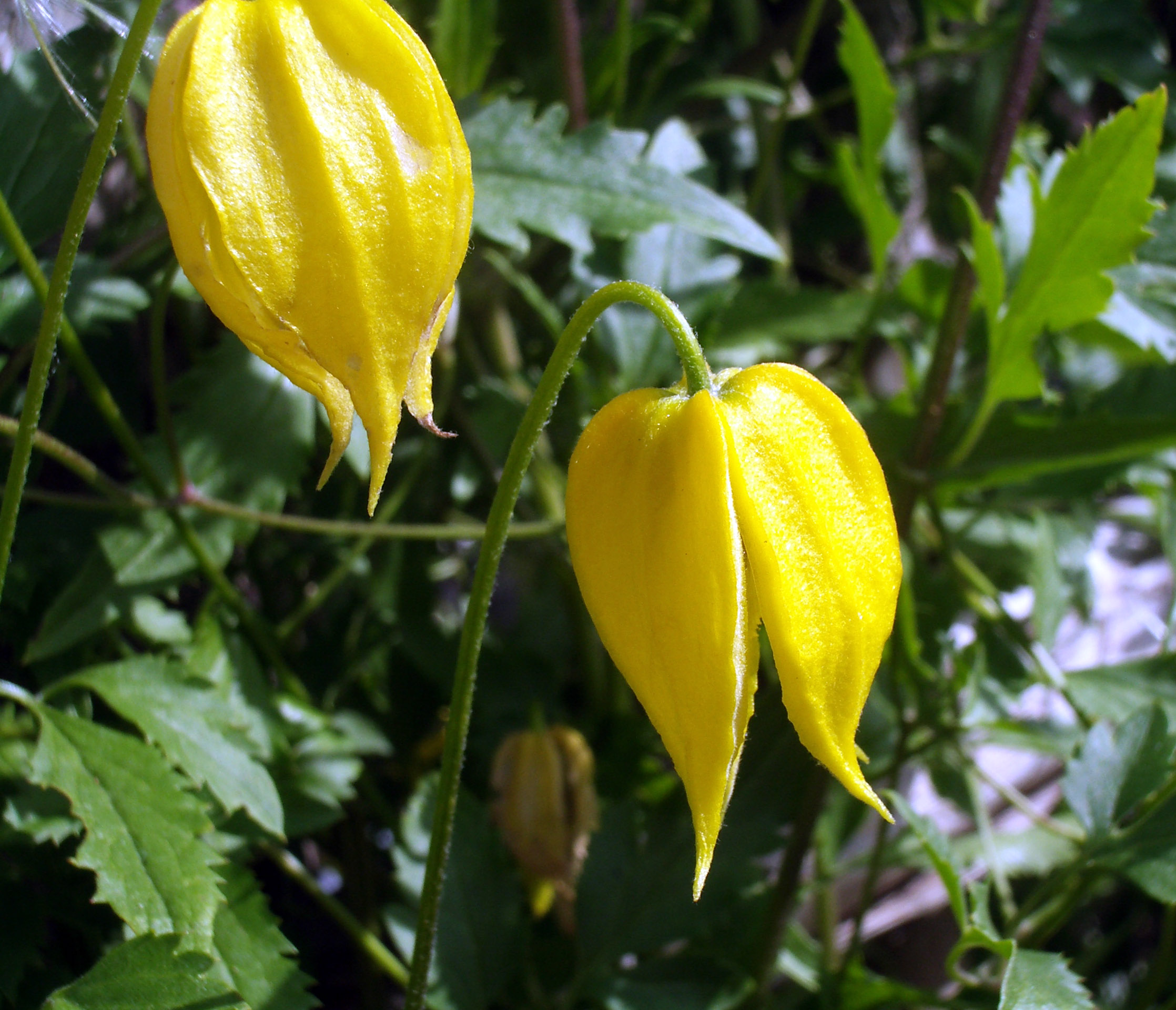
Flowers and leaves

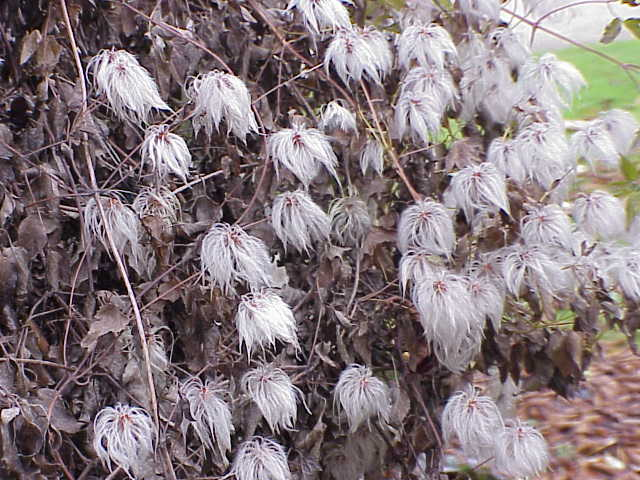
Mature fruit

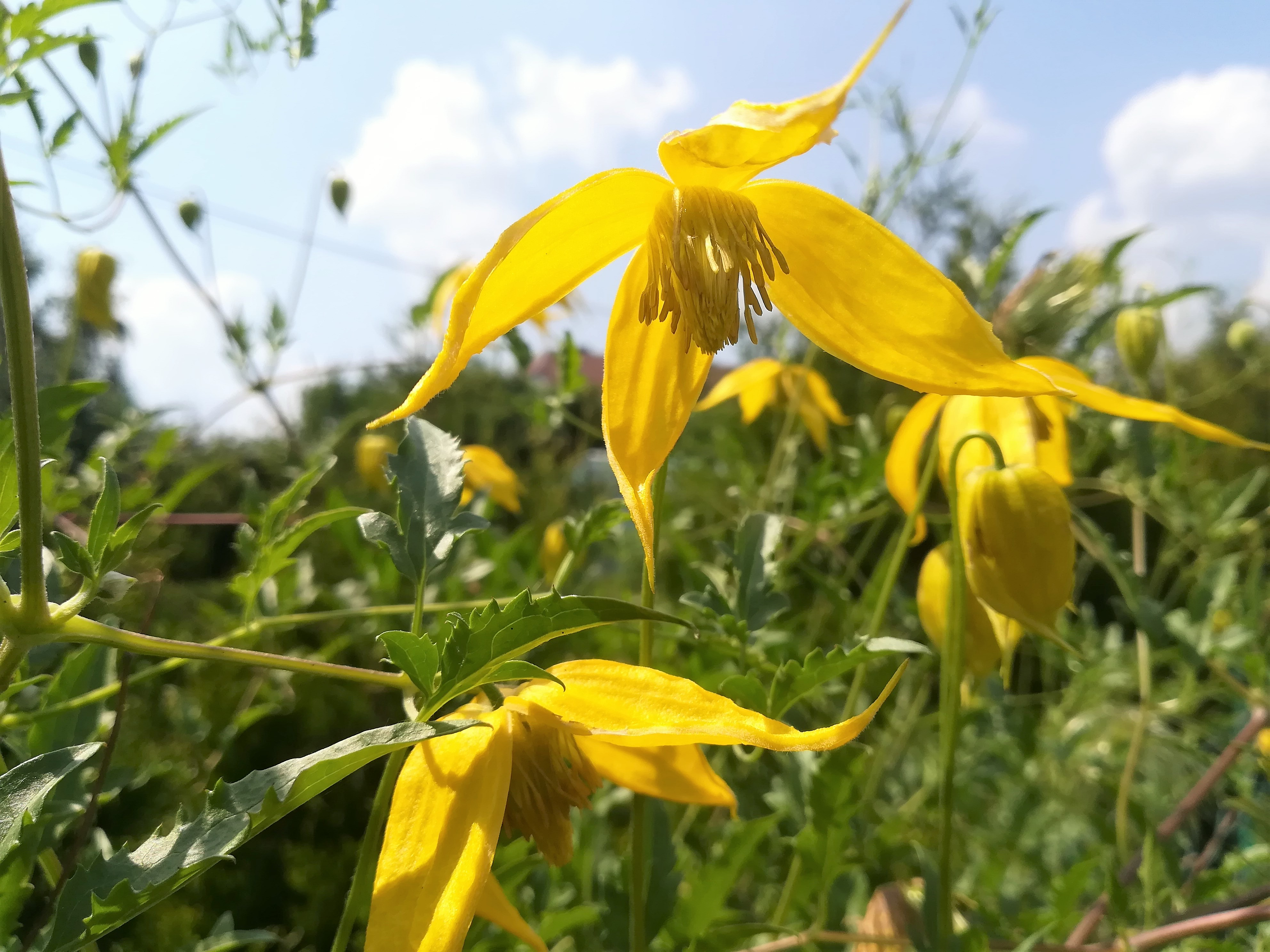
Open flowers

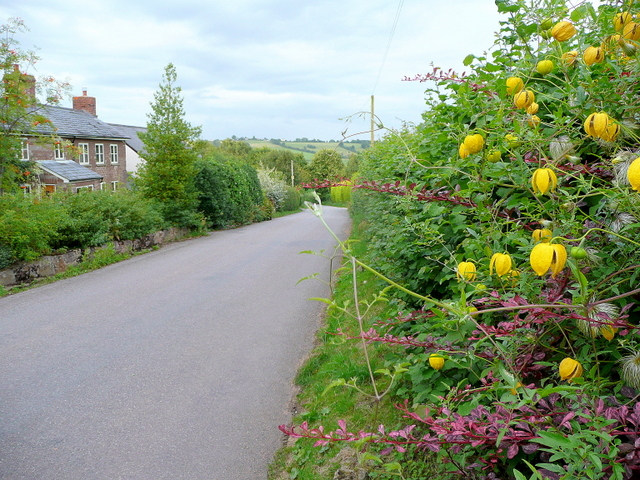
On a roadside in Britain
