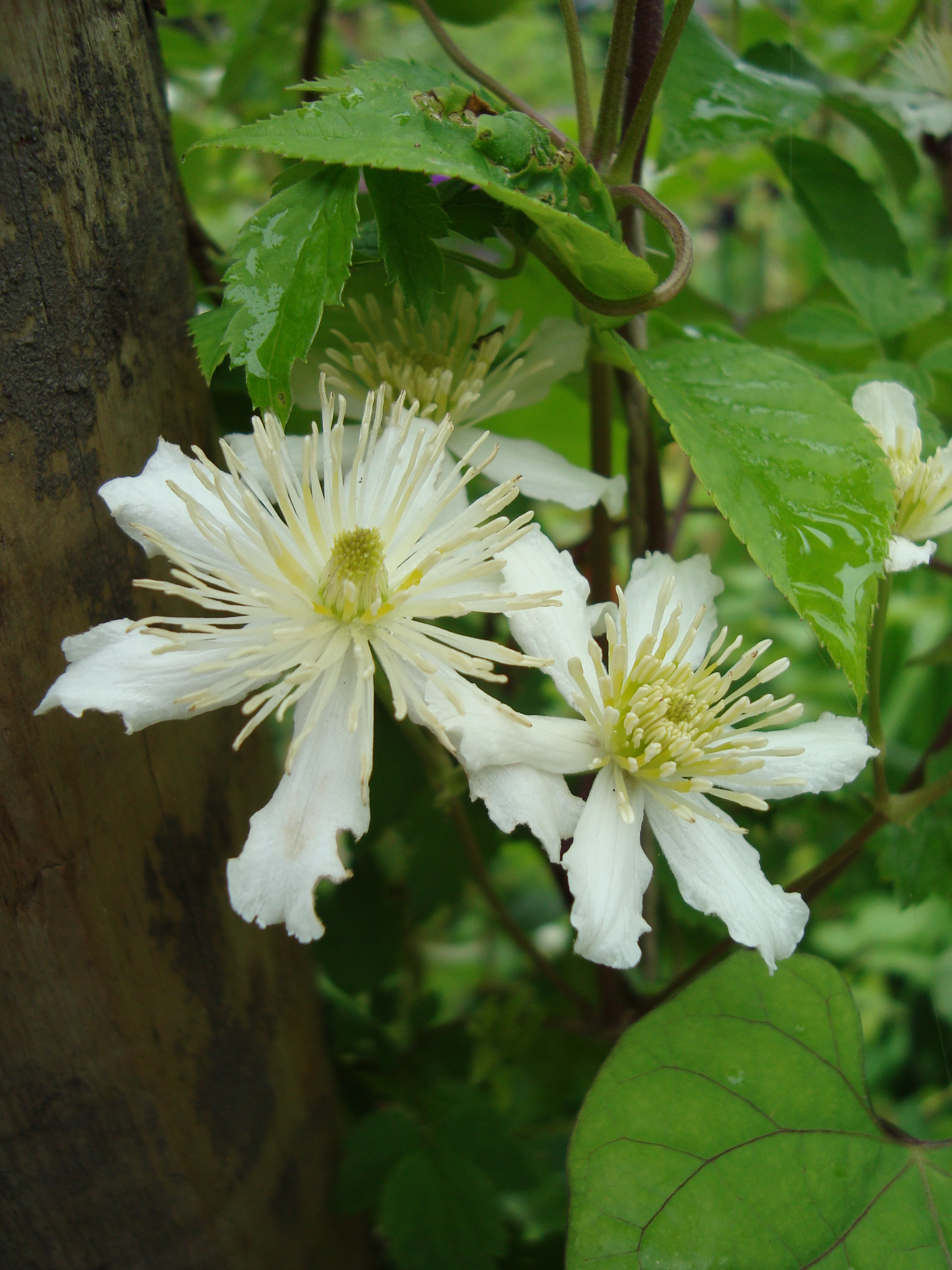
- Here labeled as Clematis potaninii var. fargesii
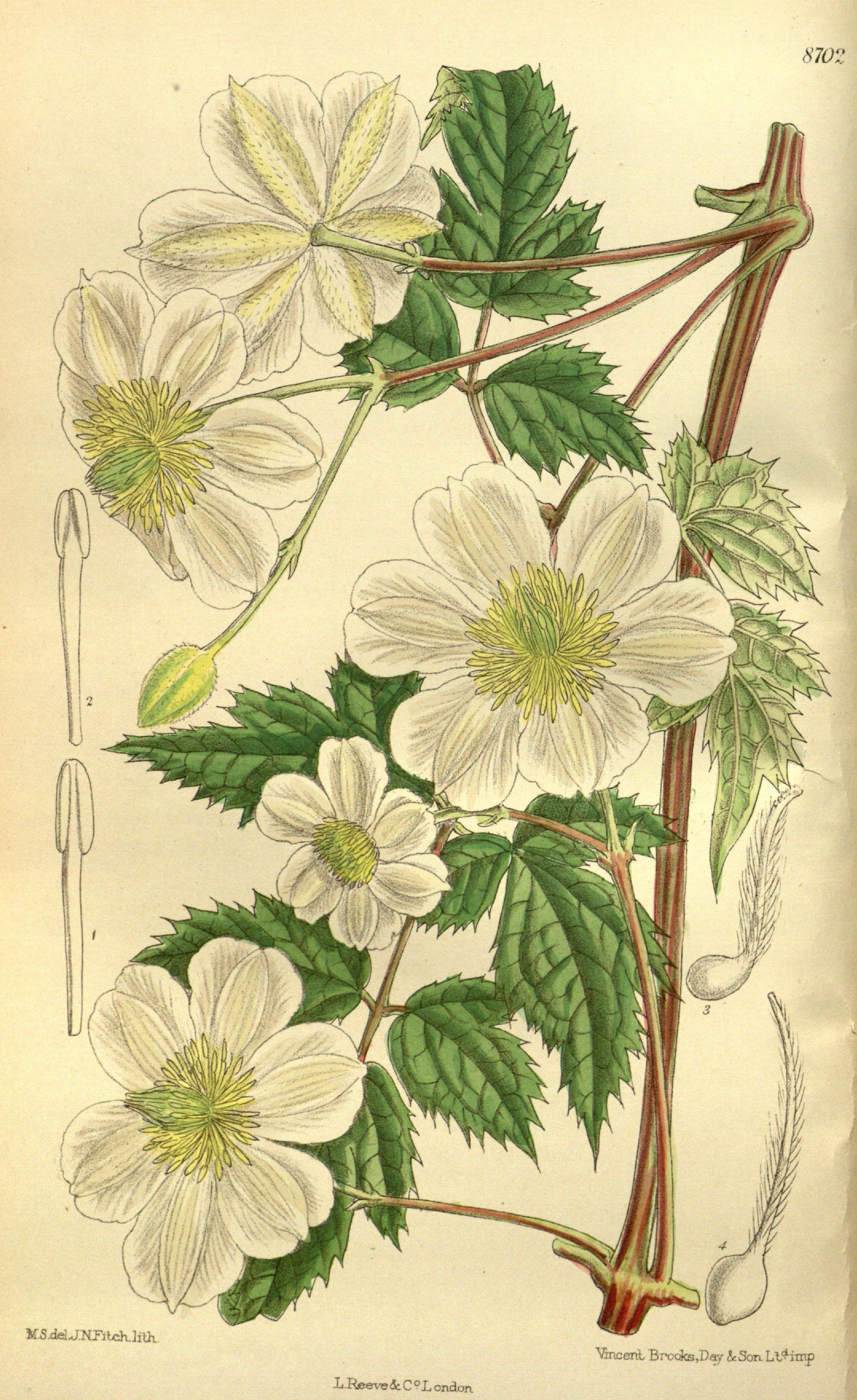
- Botanical illustration

Scientific classification
- Kingdom: Plantae
- Clade: Tracheophytes
- Clade: Angiosperms
- Clade: Eudicots
- Order: Ranunculales
- Family: Ranunculaceae
- Genus: Clematis
- Species: C. potaninii

Binomial name
- Clematis potaninii Maxim.

Synonyms
- Clematis fargesii Franch.; Clematis fargesii var. souliei Finet & Gagnep.; Clematis montana var. potaninii (Maxim.) Finet & Gagnep.; Clematis potaninii var. fargesii (Franch.) Hand.-Mazz.

= Clematis potaninii =

Species of plant

Clematis potaninii, the old man's beard, is a species of flowering plant in the family Ranunculaceae, native to Tibet and central China. A deciduous woody vine, in the wild it is found climbing on slopes and in forests, particularly forest edges, at elevations from 1,400 to 4,000 m (4,600 to 13,100 ft). Its cultivar 'Summer Snow', also known as 'Paul Farges', has gained the Royal Horticultural Society's Award of Garden Merit.

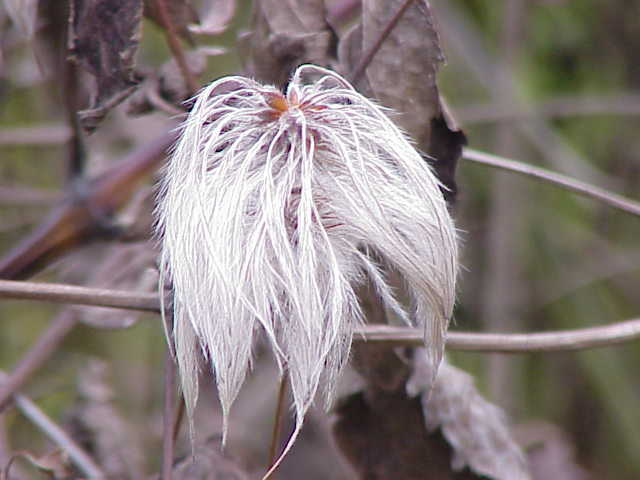
Seedhead
