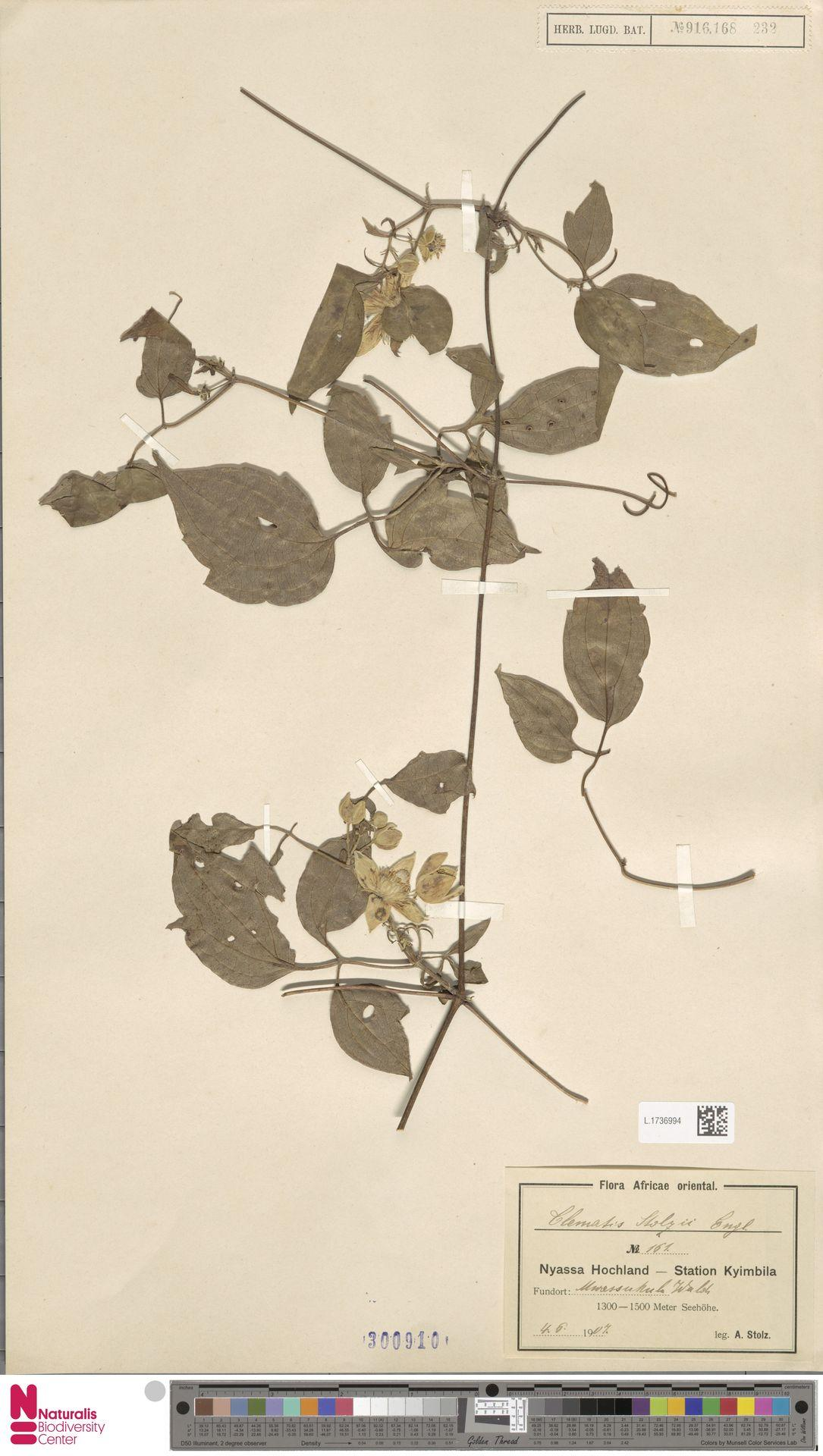
- Herbarium specimen of C. viridiflora

Scientific classification
- Kingdom: Plantae
- Clade: Tracheophytes
- Clade: Angiosperms
- Clade: Eudicots
- Order: Ranunculales
- Family: Ranunculaceae
- Genus: Clematis
- Species: C. viridiflora

Binomial name
- Clematis viridiflora Bertol.

Synonyms
- Clematis zanzebarica Sweet; Clematis zanzibarensis Bojer ex G.Don; Clematis stolzii Engl.

= Clematis viridiflora =

Species of flowering plant

Clematis viridiflora (common name, Kwassakwassa) is a perennial, climbing shrub in the family Ranunulaceae. The native range of the species is Kenya to Namibia. Its specific epithet, viridiflora, means "green-flowered."

== Description ==
Clematis viridiflora is a species of tall, climbing shrub. Young stems are pubescent but become glabrous, and are longitudinally ribbed and furrowed. Leaves are opposite, five or more foliolate, with leaflets broadly ovate, irregularly lobed and toothed. Flowers range in colour from pale green to yellowish-green. Sepals are thin and membranous. Fruit is an achene.

== Habitat ==
Unusually for an African clematis, it is a coastal species, often growing on dunes.

== Medicinal usage ==
Clematis viridiflora is used as a traditional medicinal plant in Mozambique, where the roots and leaves are used as an inhalation to treat headaches.
