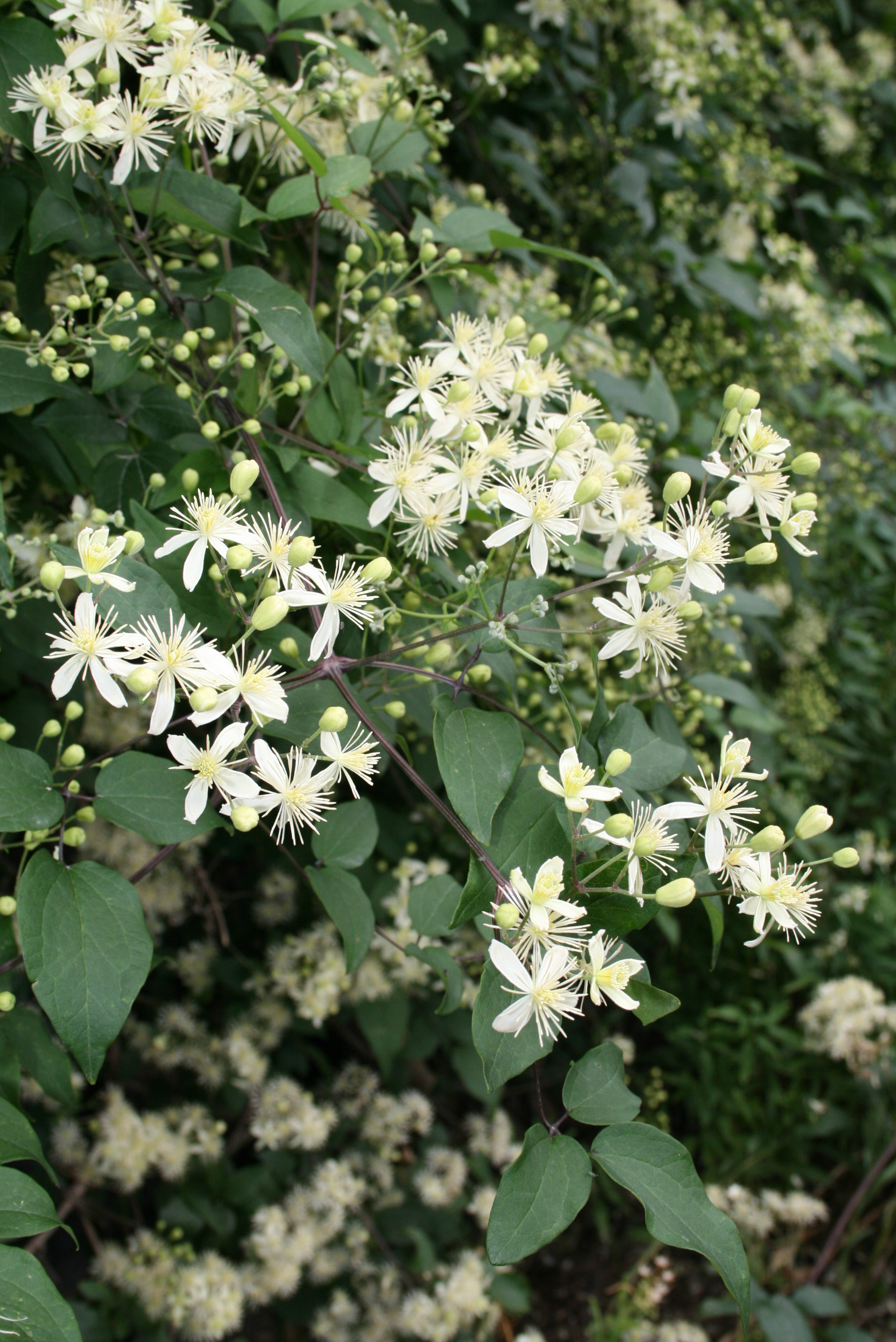

Scientific classification
- Kingdom: Plantae
- Clade: Tracheophytes
- Clade: Angiosperms
- Clade: Eudicots
- Order: Ranunculales
- Family: Ranunculaceae
- Genus: Clematis
- Species: C. gouriana

Binomial name
- Clematis gouriana Roxb. ex DC.

= Clematis gouriana =

Species of flowering plant in the buttercup family

Clematis gouriana, or Indian Traveller's Joy, is a liana found in Asia which belongs to the buttercup family (Ranunculaceae). It was described by Roxb. ex DC. and published in Regni Vegetabilis Systema Naturale 1: 138-139, in 1818.

== Distribution ==
The creeper occurs in the Himalayas from Pakistan, India, eastward through Nepal, Bhutan, Bangladesh and into western and southern China. The hilly districts of the Western Ghats, the eastern part of the India subcontinent, and Sri Lanka. In India, the creeper occurs in the states of Himachal Pradesh, Punjab, Haryana, Uttar Pradesh, Bihar, Orissa, Madhya Pradesh, Andhra Pradesh, Maharashtra, Karnataka, Kerala, Tamil Nadu, West Bengal, Sikkim, Assam, Meghalaya, Arunachal Pradesh, Nagaland, Manipur and Tripura. The creeper is common in the Western Ghats, and the patches of adjoining forest of the Konkan coast and the Deccan Plateau.

== Description ==
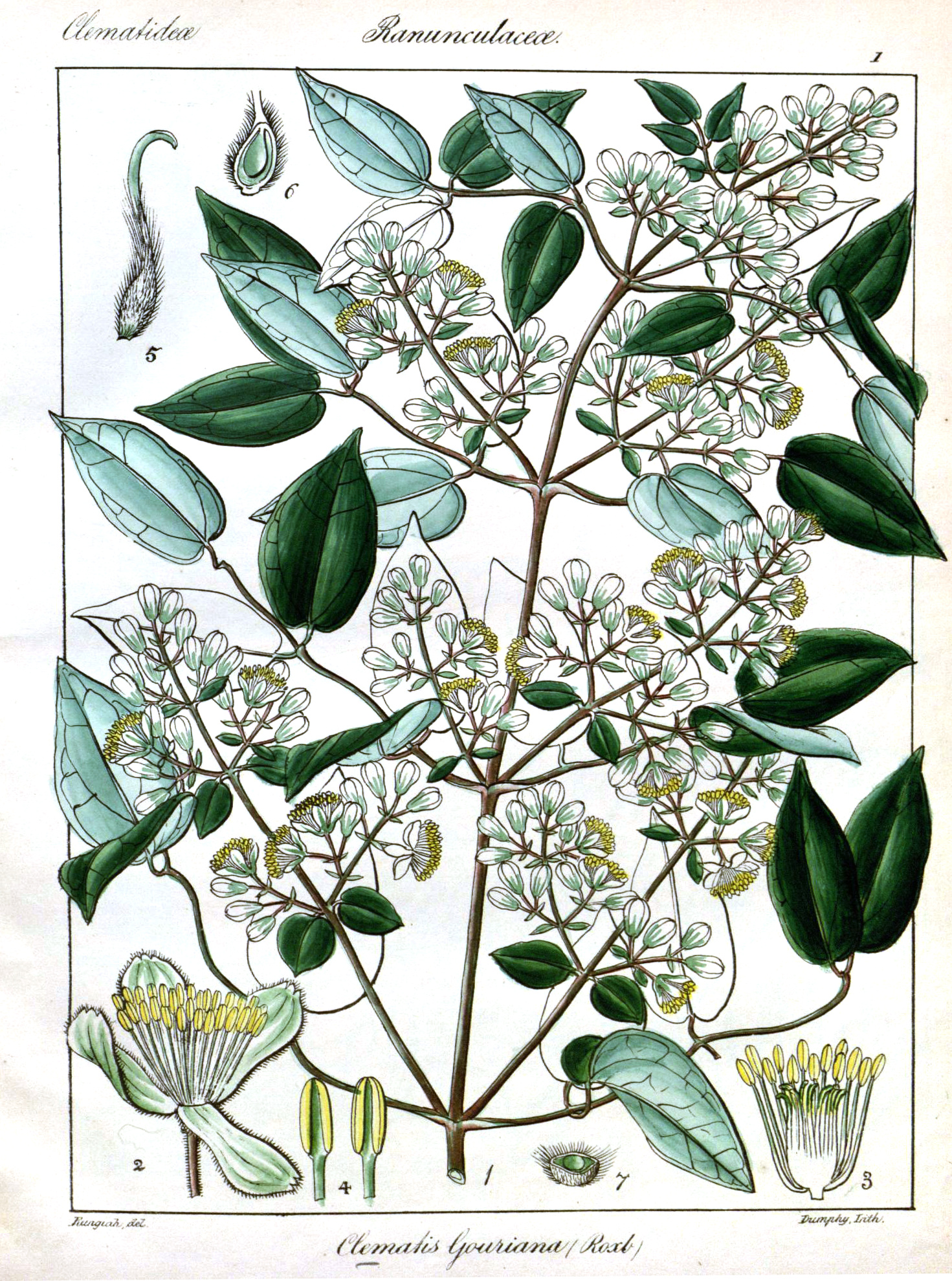
Botanical illustration of C. gouriana by Rungiah in Spicilegium Neilgherrense, Volume 1 (1851) (plate 1 of 2).

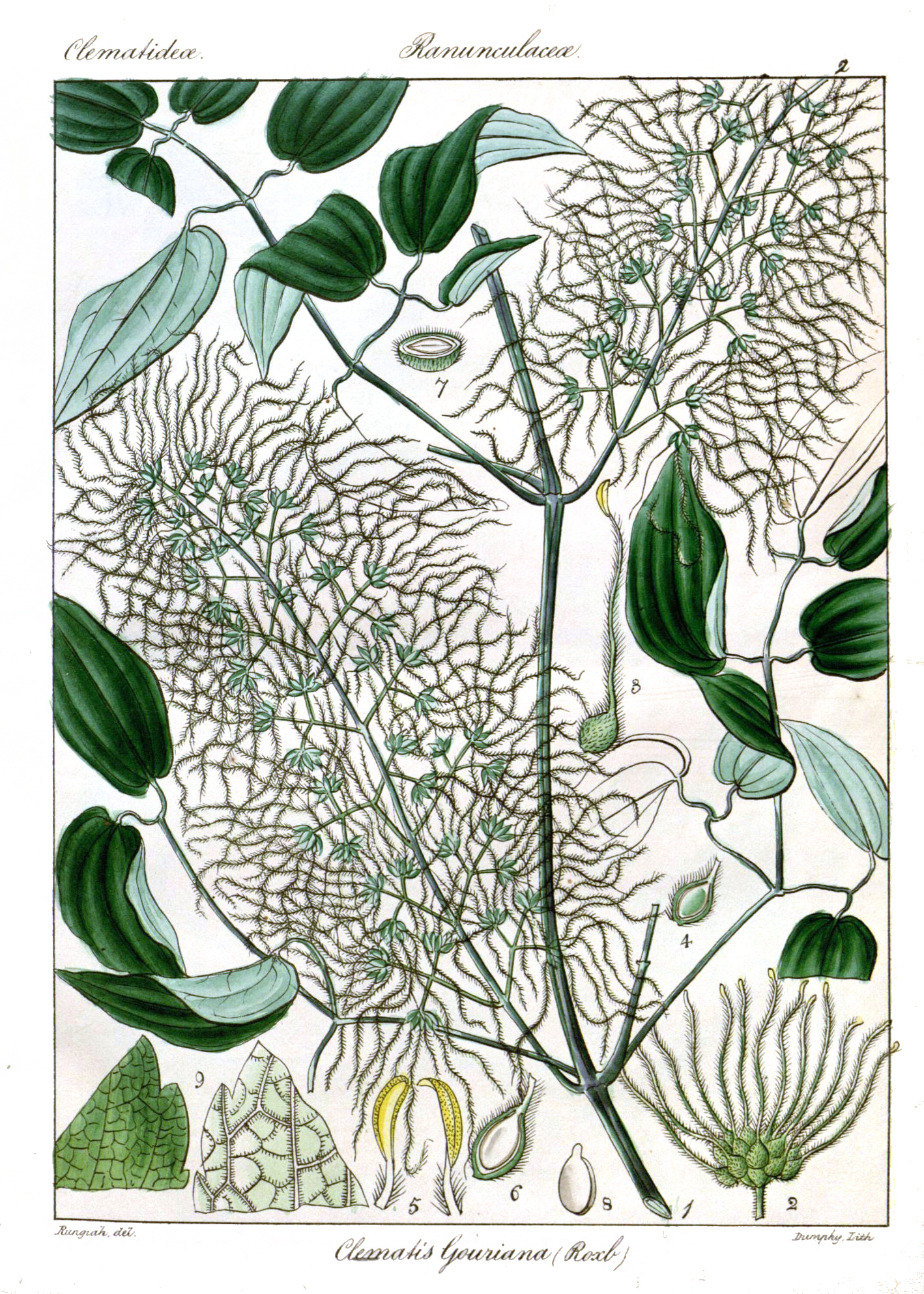
Botanical illustration of C. gouriana by Rungiah in Spicilegium Neilgherrense, Volume 1 (1851) (plate 2 of 2).

A large climbing shrub, reaching up to the canopies of trees. Glabrous, except for the younger parts of the plant. Grooved stem and branches. Leaves are pinnate, sometimes bi-pinnate or tri-pinnate. Leaflets may be ovate or oblong acuminate, with nerves and reticulate venation, and have a shining surface. Small flowers in many branched pannicles. Each flower is 1 to 1.5 inches wide, fragrant and greenish-white. Petals are absent but four greenish sepals present which are oblong-ovate and covered with soft down. Many stamens, with free, narrow and straight filaments which thicken towards the top. Compressed achenes, narrowly ovoid or oblong, with persistent feathery style.

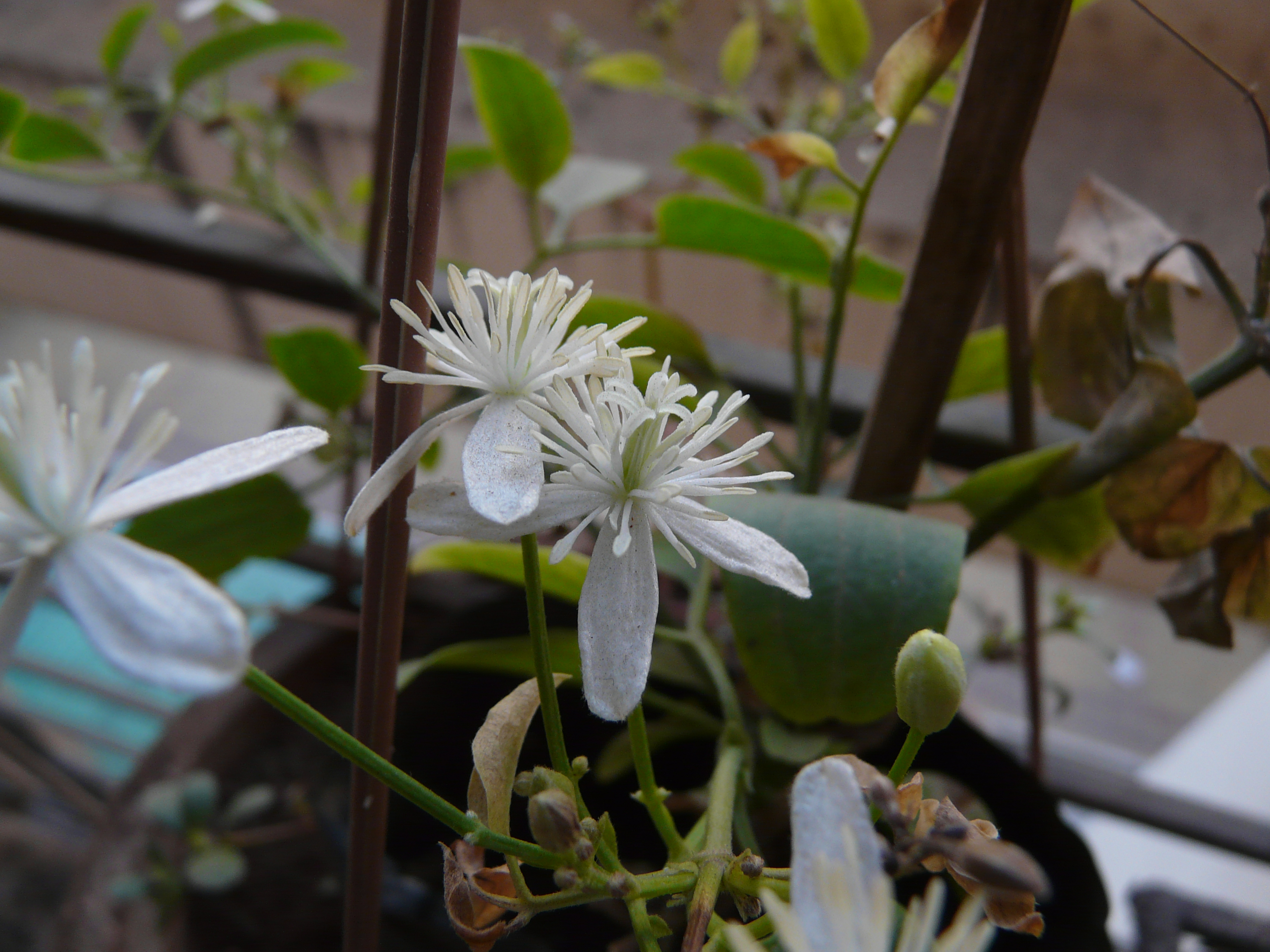
Flowers

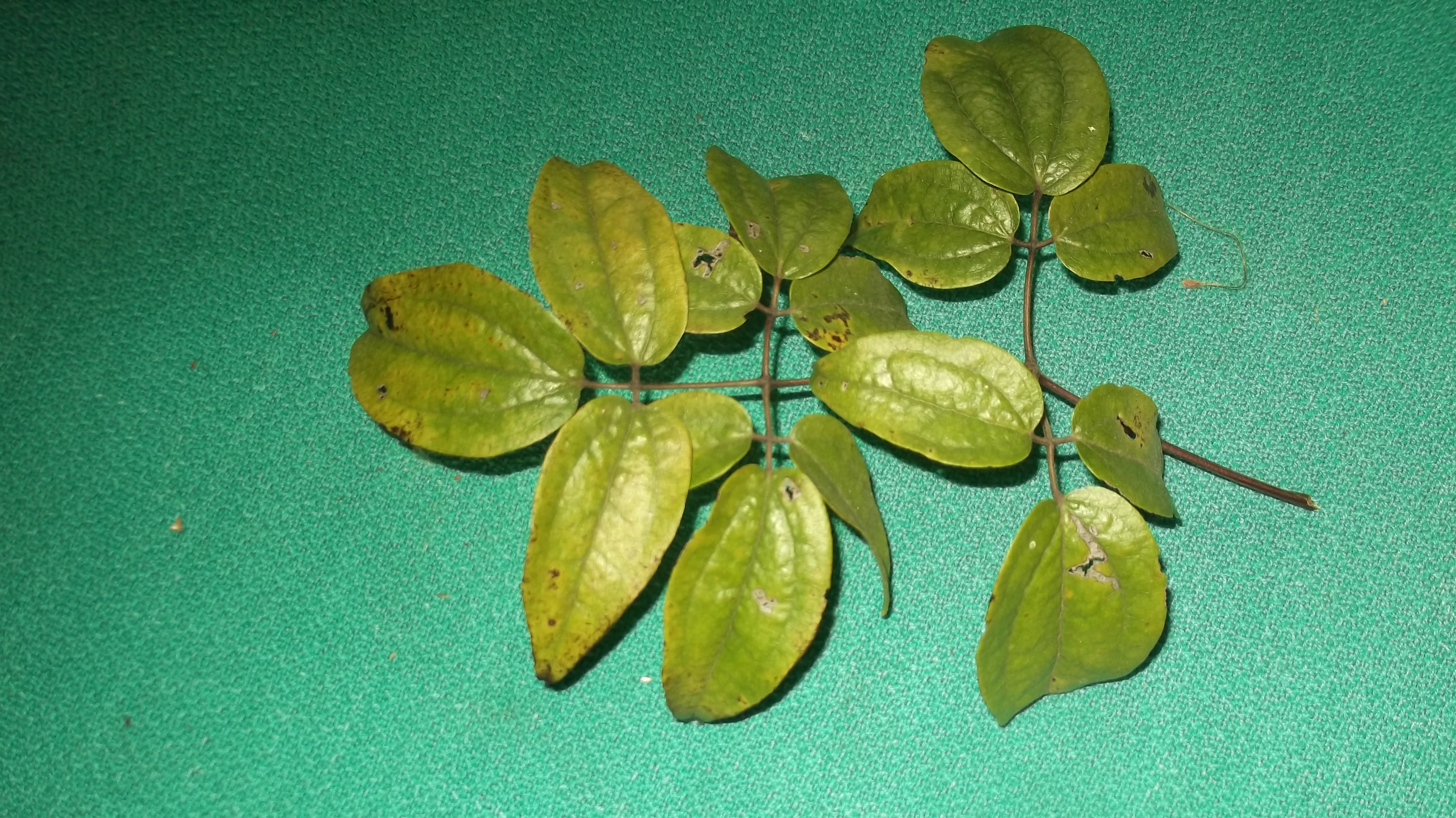
Pinnate leaflets

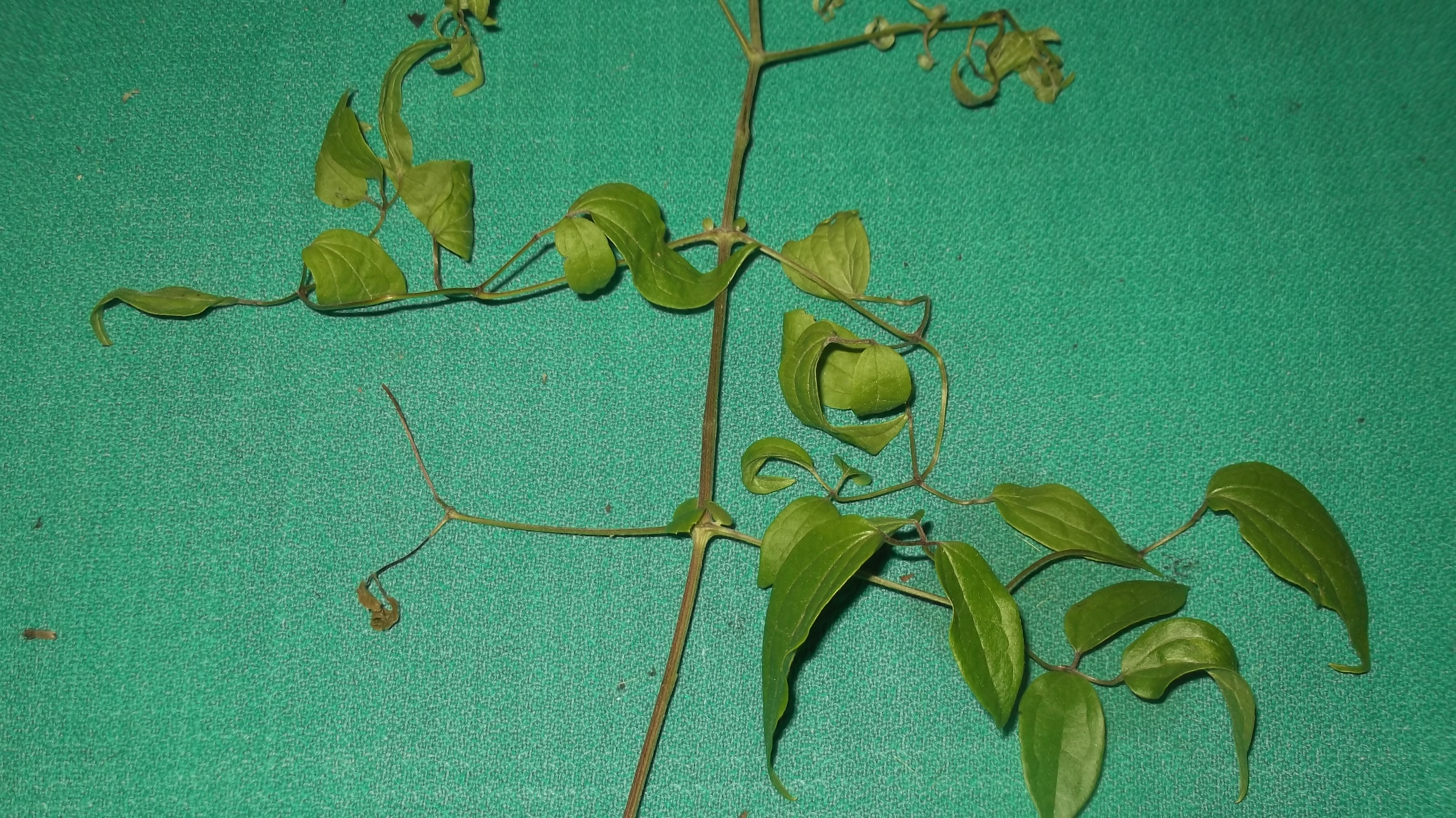
Ribbed stems

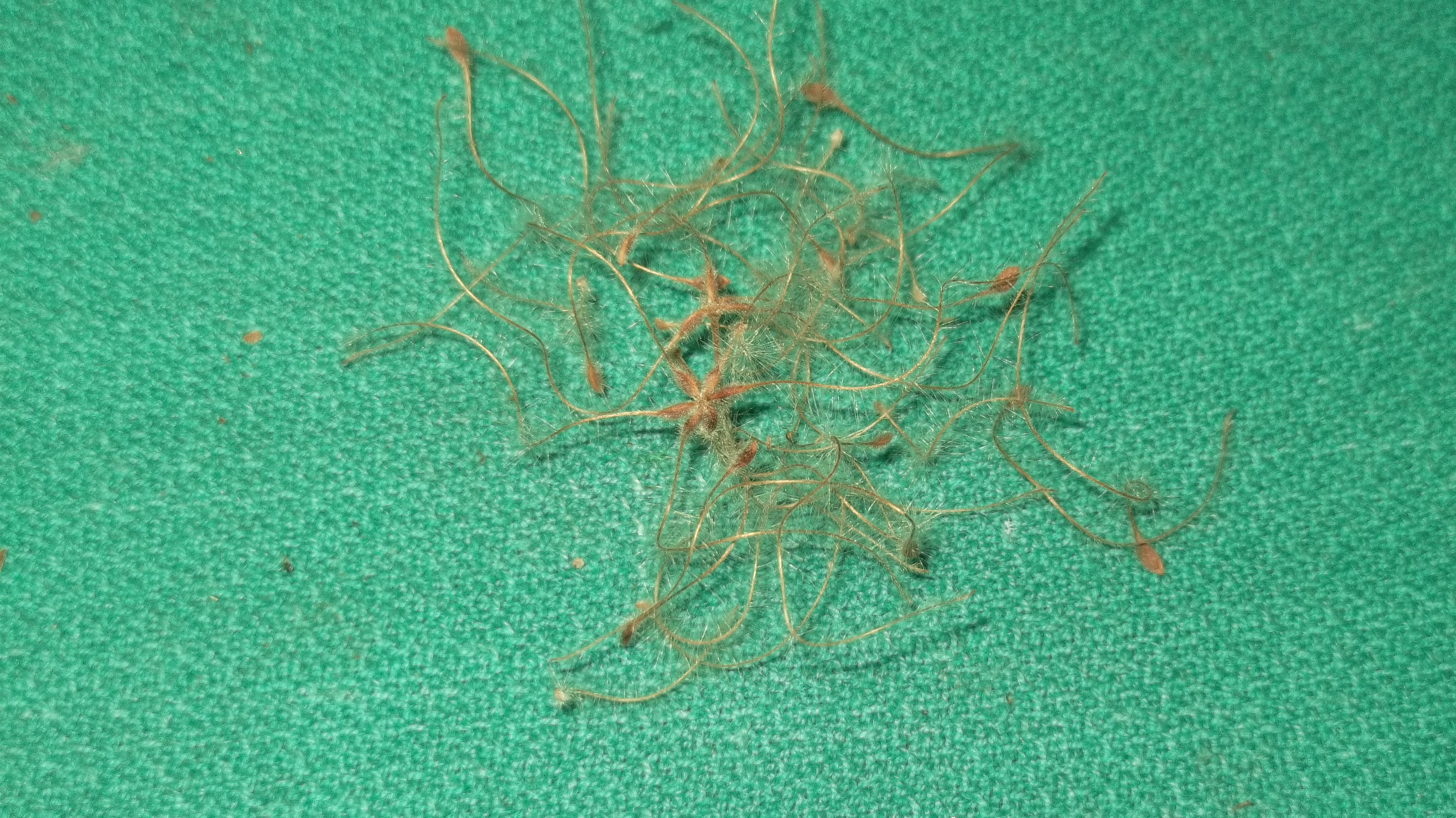
Achenes

== Natural history ==
C. gouriana is a vigorous climber spreading on thickets and climbing on trees. Principally in tropical and subtropical forests. It occurs up to 5,000 feet (1,500 m) in the Himalayas; in the hilly districts of the peninsula it occurs between 1,000 feet (300 m) and 3,000 feet (910 m). Flowering takes place from August to February, while fruits appear from September to May.

== Medicinal uses ==
C. gouriana is recognised as a medicinal herb in traditional medicine and amongst tribal communities. It has been investigated for its medicinal properties.

The bruised leaves and stem act as a vesicant and are poisonous. In Ayurveda, the leaves of the plant have been used for treating puerperal fever and bruises. Leaf paste is applied to wounds of cattle by Jatapu, Khond and Savara tribals of Andhra Pradesh, India.

== In culture ==
In Himachal Pradesh, the plant is called Takri: 𑚏𑚮𑚠𑚖𑚱 ISO: cibaḍū or Takri: 𑚏𑚮𑚠𑚤𑚱 ISO: cibarū.
