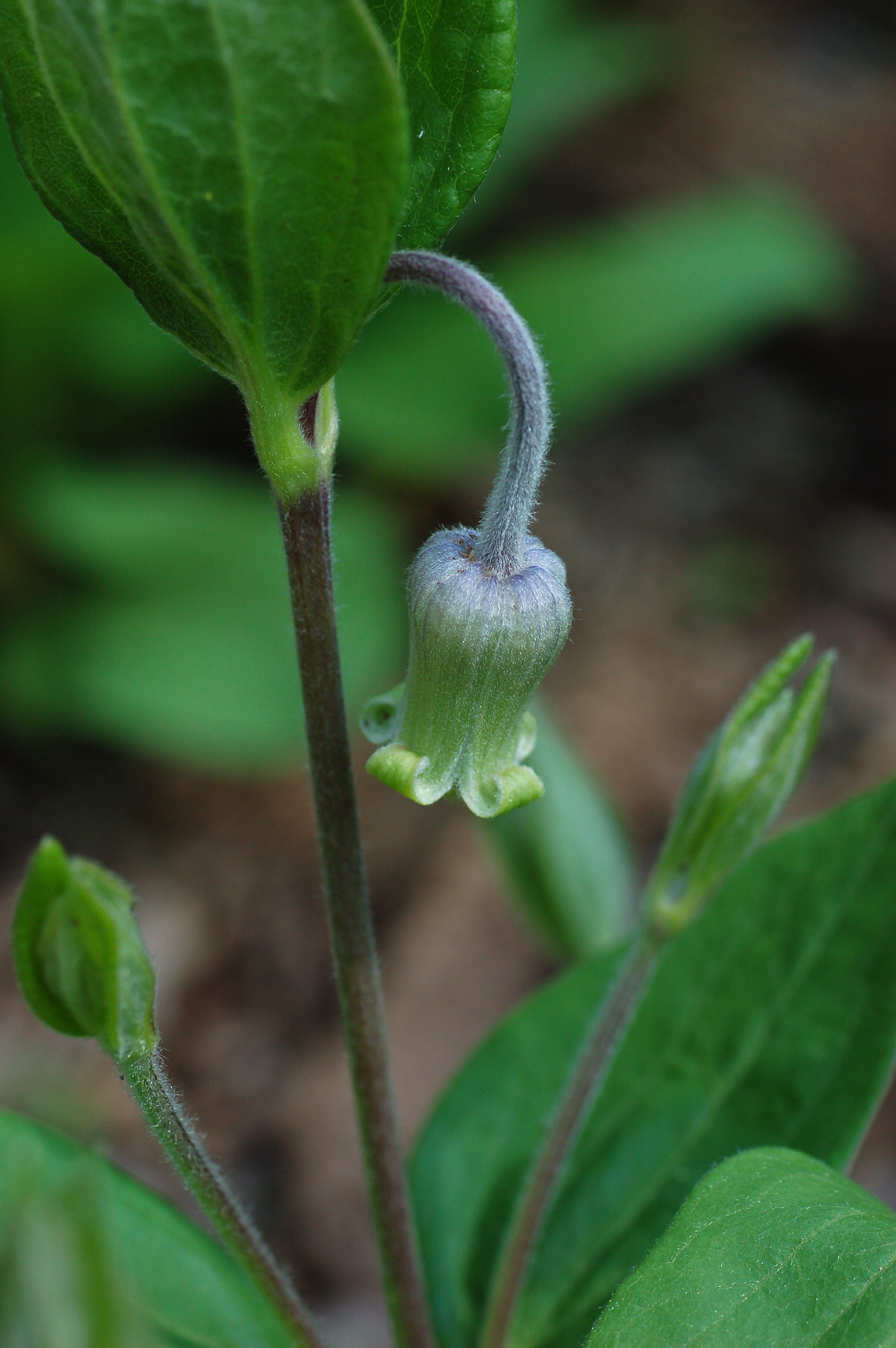

Scientific classification
- Kingdom: Plantae
- Clade: Tracheophytes
- Clade: Angiosperms
- Clade: Eudicots
- Order: Ranunculales
- Family: Ranunculaceae
- Genus: Clematis
- Species: C. ochroleuca

Binomial name
- Clematis ochroleuca Aiton

= Clematis ochroleuca =

Species of flowering plant in the buttercup family

Clematis ochroleuca is a species of flowering plant in the buttercup family, Ranunculaceae, known by the common names curlyheads and erect silky leather-flower. It is native to North America with a distribution on the east coast of the United States from Long Island to northern Georgia.
