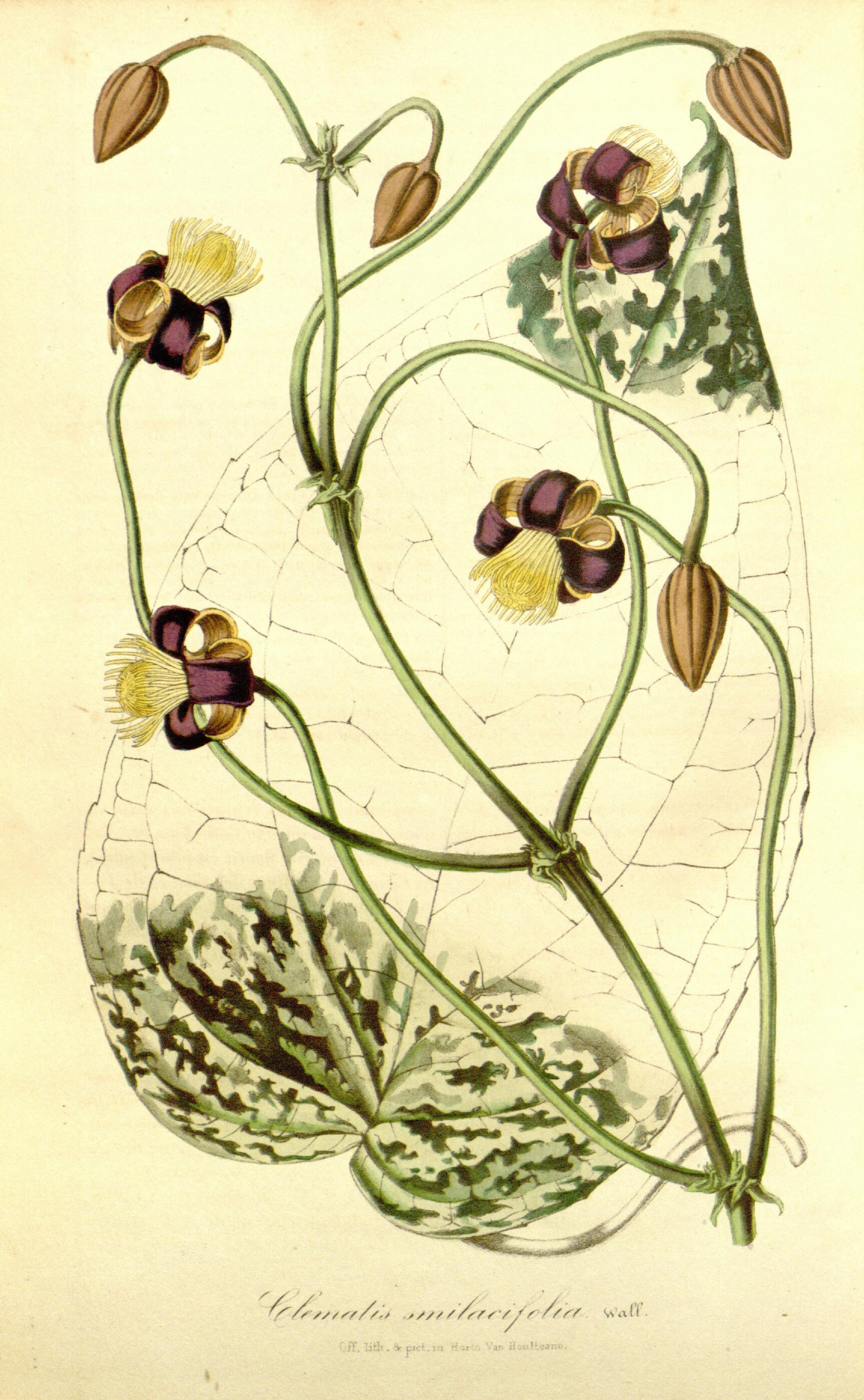

Scientific classification
- Kingdom: Plantae
- Clade: Tracheophytes
- Clade: Angiosperms
- Clade: Eudicots
- Order: Ranunculales
- Family: Ranunculaceae
- Genus: Clematis
- Species: C. smilacifolia

Binomial name
- Clematis smilacifolia L.

= Clematis smilacifolia =

Species of flowering plant in the buttercup family

Clematis smilacifolia is a species of flowering plant in the buttercup family Ranunculaceae. It usually grows on the margins of woodland areas and is native to tropical and subtropical Asia.
