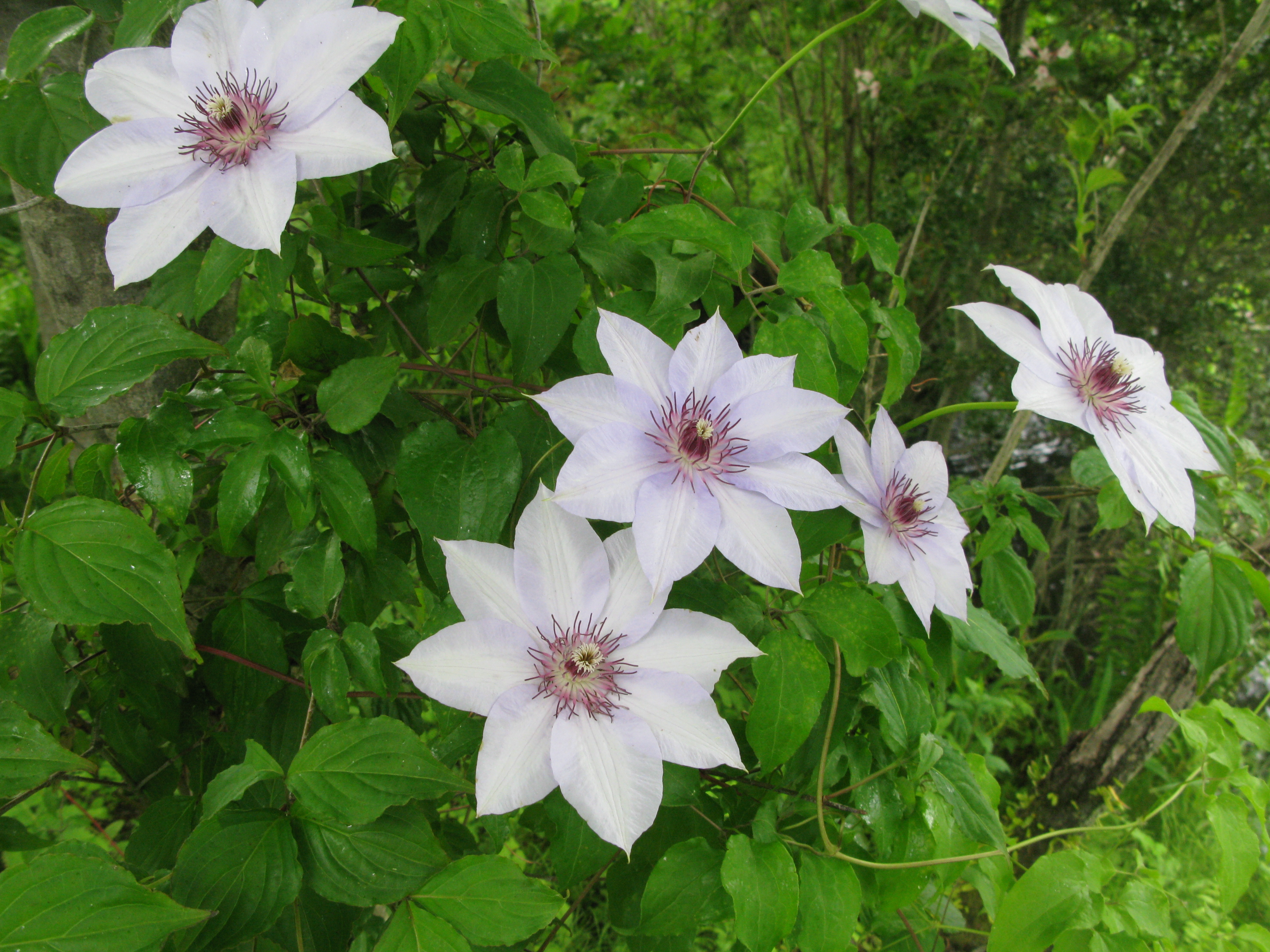

Scientific classification
- Kingdom: Plantae
- Clade: Tracheophytes
- Clade: Angiosperms
- Clade: Eudicots
- Order: Ranunculales
- Family: Ranunculaceae
- Genus: Clematis
- Species: C. patens

Binomial name
- Clematis patens C.Morren et Decne.

Synonyms
- Clematis azurea var. grandiflora Sieber; Clematis azurea var. grandiflora Sieber ex Loudon; Clematis florida var. standishii T.Moore; Clematis luloni K.Koch; Clematis monstrosa K.Koch; Clematis patens f. alba Makino; Clematis patens f. coerulescens Makino; Clematis patens var. gablenzii Courtin; Clematis patens var. pallida Regel; Clematis patens var. patens; Clematis patens var. revoluta Regel; Clematis patens var. sophia Van Houtte; Clematis patens var. standishii (T.Moore) Regel; Clematis patens var. standishii (T.Moore) Rehder, 1914; Clematis standishii (T.Moore) T.Moore

= Clematis patens =

Species of flowering plant in the buttercup family

Clematis patens is a species of perennial plant in the genus Clematis in the Ranunculaceae family. It is native to Japan (Honshu, Shikoku, and northern Kyushu) and Northeast Asia. It usually grows on the edge of forests. It is also planted for ornamental purposes.

== Etymology ==
The name of the genus Clematis is a derivation of the Ancient Greek word "clématis", which means "climbing". This is a description of the tendency that species show to be climbers. And patens means "opening". In Japan, C. patens is called "kazaguruma", which means pinwheel.

== Description ==
=== Stem ===
The stems are brown and they become woody.

=== Flower ===
White or pale purple single flowers grow at the tips of short shoots in May or June. The calyx that looks like a petal is usually 8 pieces and length of 7–8 cm, but the variation is large depending on the type. Achene is broad-ovate, yellow-brown feather-like.

=== Leaf ===
The leaves are pinnate compound leaves consisting of 3–5 leaflets and length of 3–10 cm.

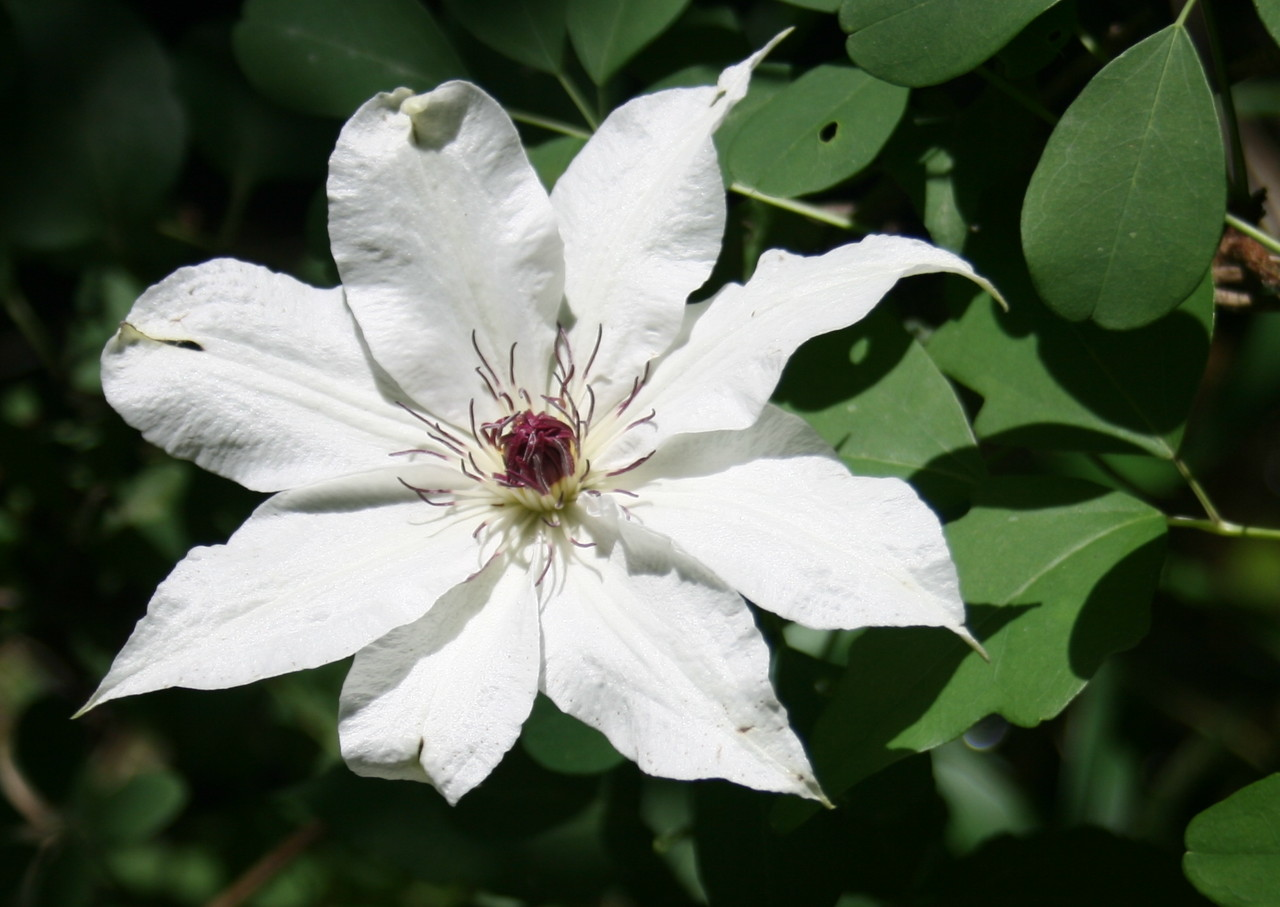
The flower composed of eight sepals

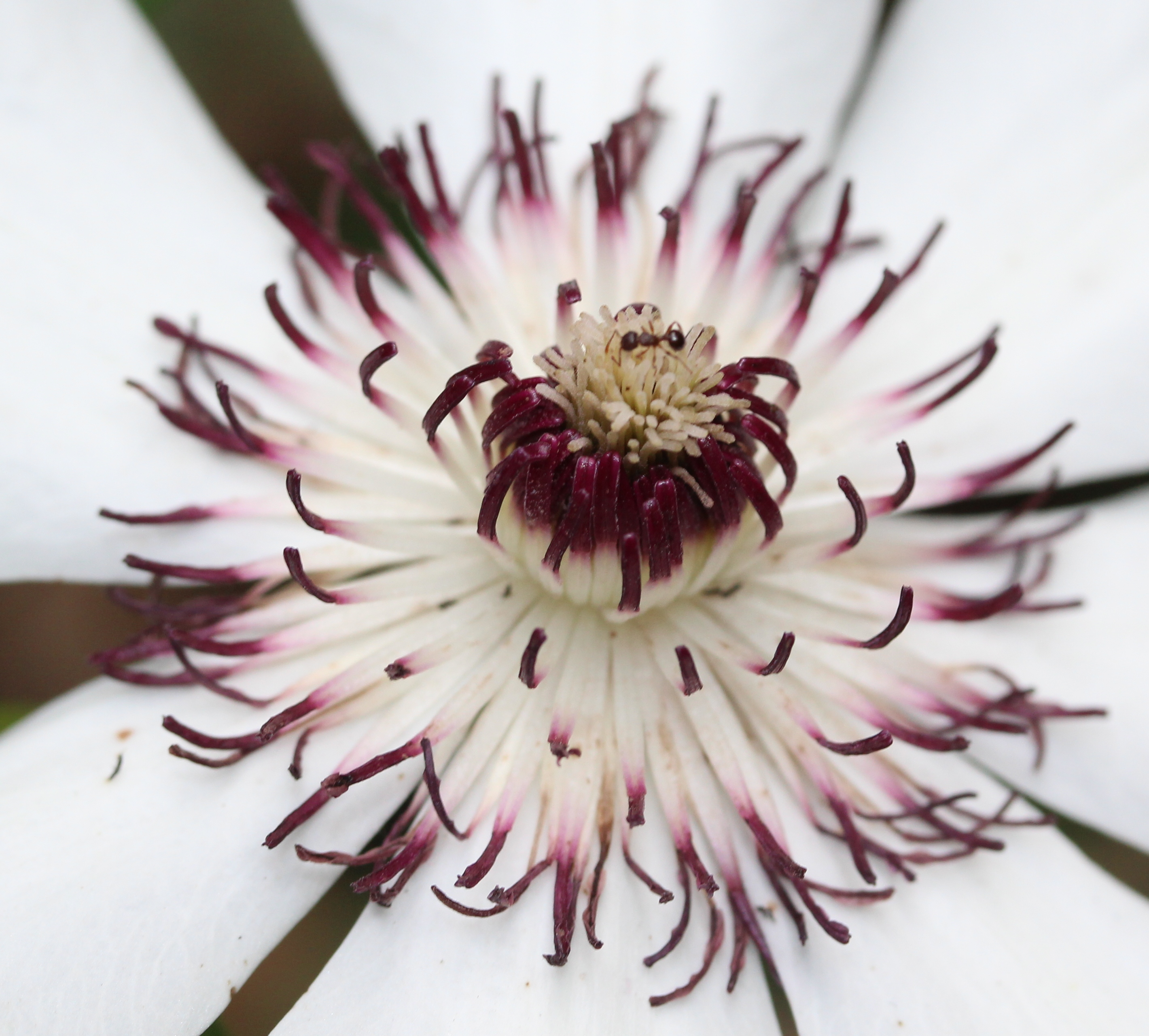
Close-up of numerous stamens and pistils

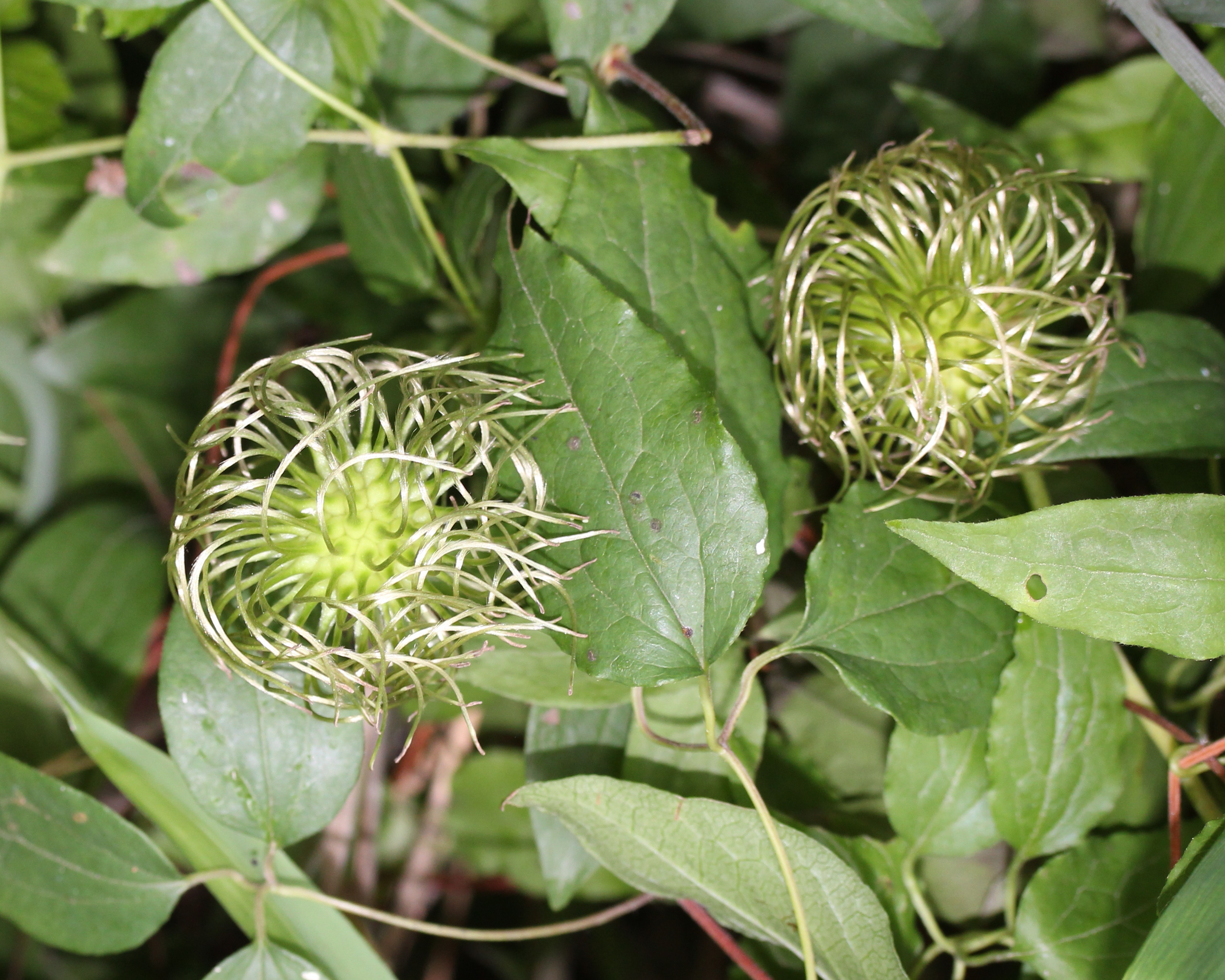
Young achenes

== Conservation ==
Clematis patens has been designated as Near Threatened (NT) on the Red List by the Ministry of the Environment in Japan, and some prefectures in Japan have been designated as Red List.

== Cultural significance ==
"The native fabric of Clematis patens" in Uda, Nara was designated as a Japanese national natural monument on 14 January 1948. C. patens has been designated as a city flower in Funabashi, Chiba.
