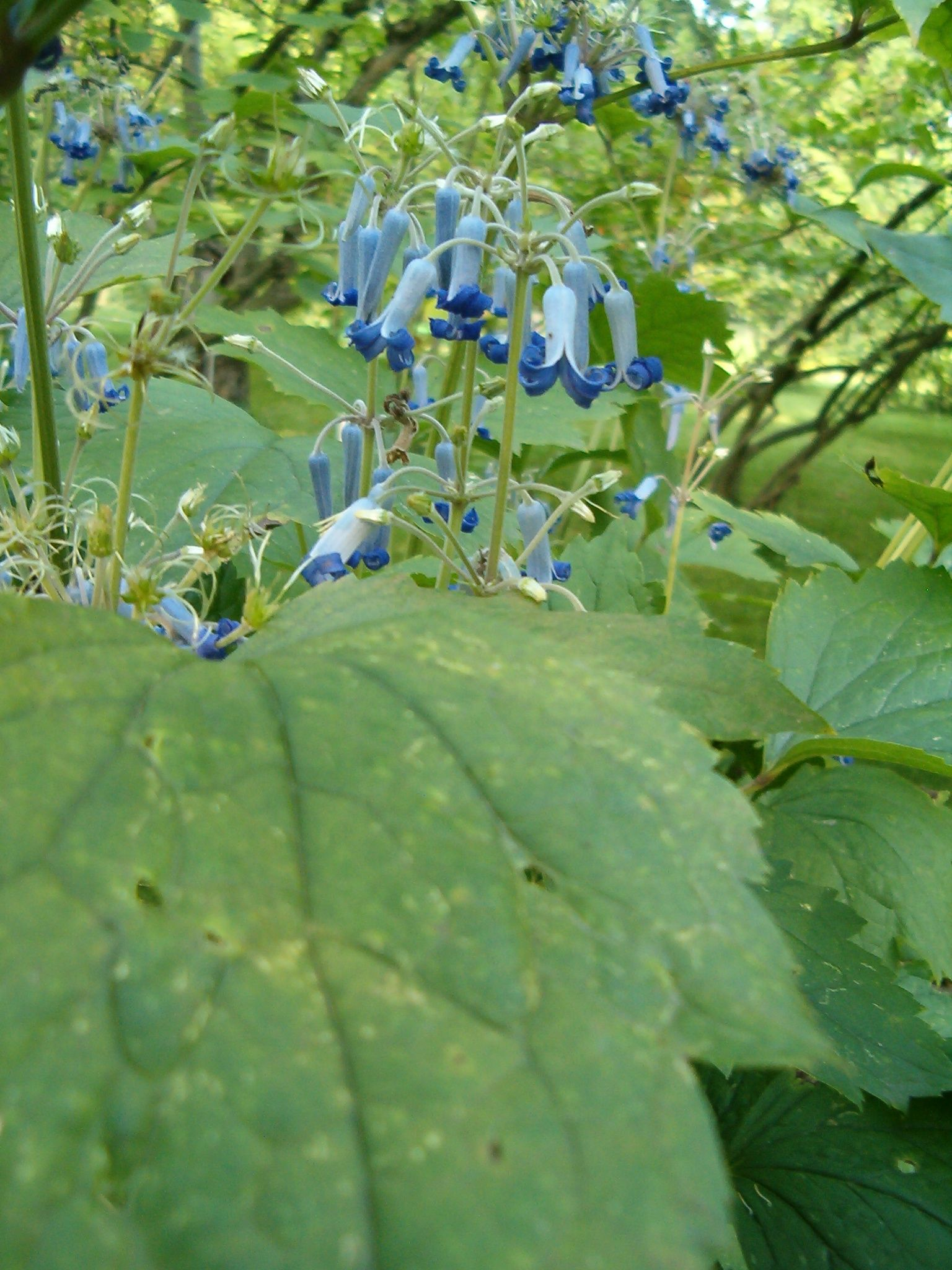

Scientific classification
- Kingdom: Plantae
- Clade: Tracheophytes
- Clade: Angiosperms
- Clade: Eudicots
- Order: Ranunculales
- Family: Ranunculaceae
- Genus: Clematis
- Species: C. heracleifolia

Binomial name
- Clematis heracleifolia DC.

= Clematis heracleifolia =

Species of vine

Clematis heracleifolia, the tube clematis (大叶铁线莲 da ye tie xian lian), is a species of flowering plant in the buttercup family Ranunculaceae, native to central and northern China. Unlike most other members of the genus Clematis, it has a scrambling rather than a climbing habit.

Growing to 1 m (3.3 ft) tall by up to 50 cm (20 in) broad, it is a deciduous sub-shrub with broad downy leaves in groups of three, and delicate clusters of elongated tubular blue flowers in late spring and summer. Mature blooms recurve (bend backwards) into a trumpet shape. Repeat flowering sometimes occurs in autumn.

The Latin specific epithet heracleifolia means "with leaves resembling hogweed" (Heracleum).

The cultivar 'Cassandra', with fragrant flowers, has won the Royal Horticultural Society's Award of Garden Merit.
