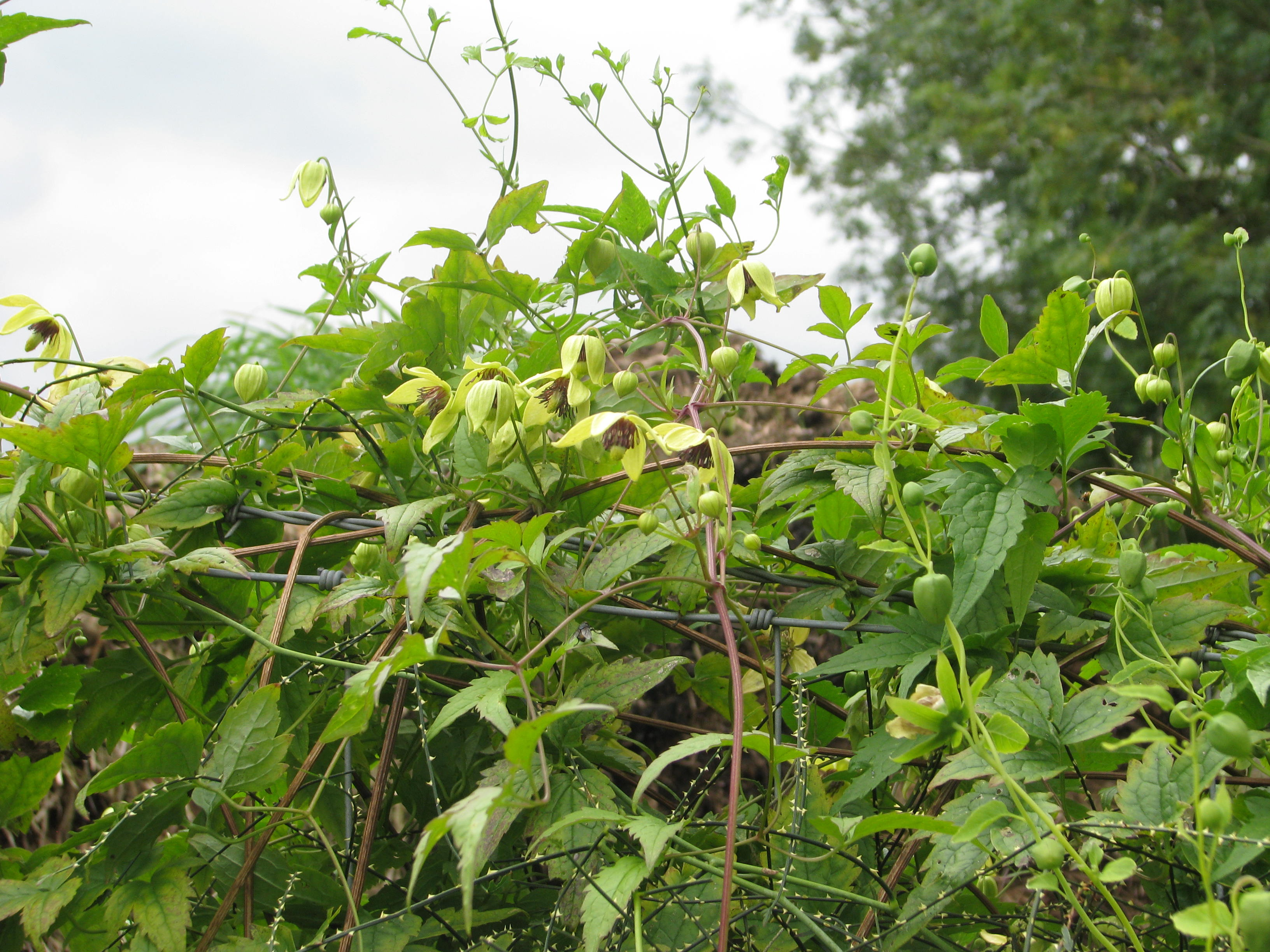
- Twining on a fence
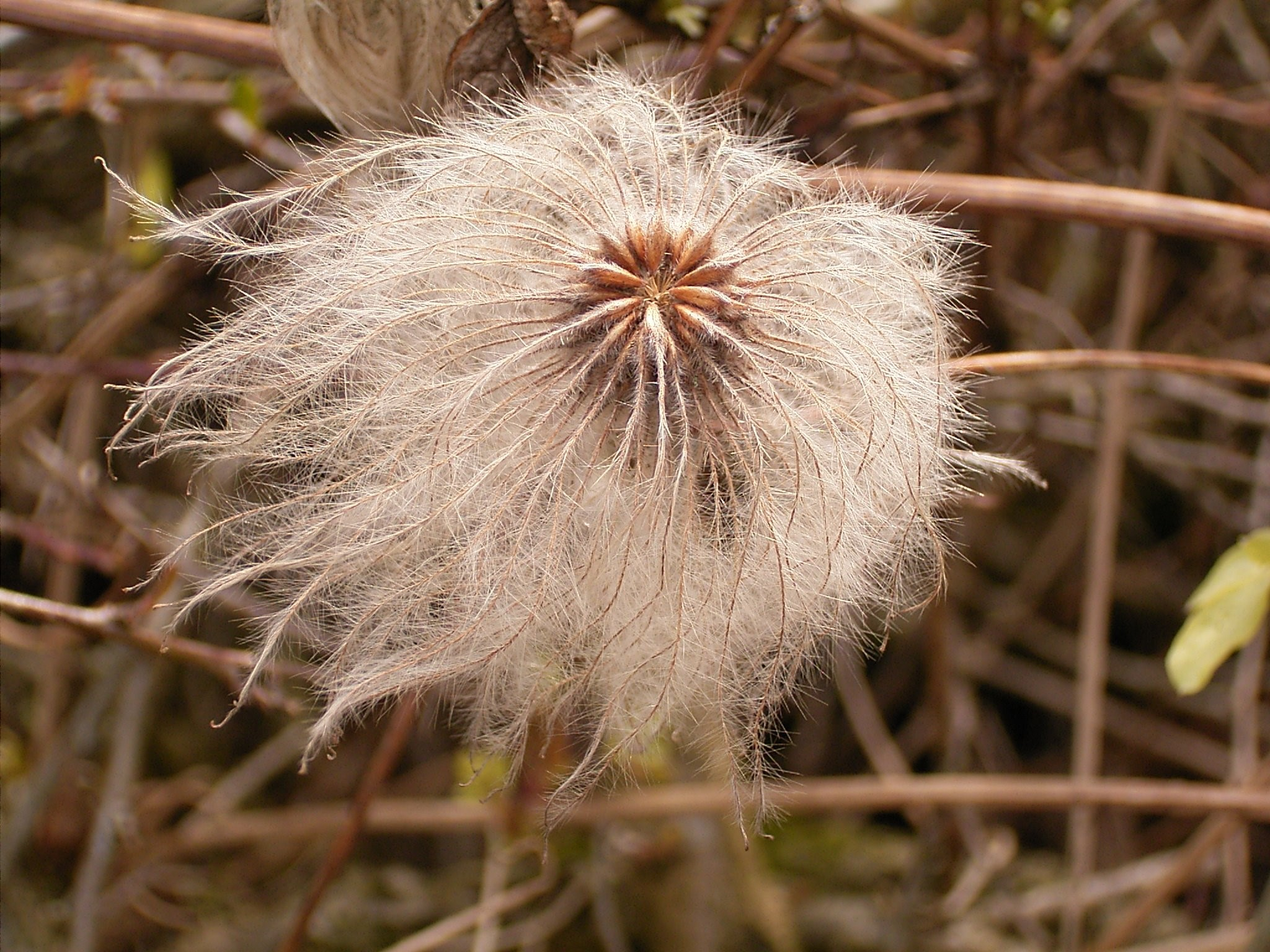
- Seedhead

Scientific classification
- Kingdom: Plantae
- Clade: Tracheophytes
- Clade: Angiosperms
- Clade: Eudicots
- Order: Ranunculales
- Family: Ranunculaceae
- Genus: Clematis
- Species: C. serratifolia

Binomial name
- Clematis serratifolia Rehder

Synonyms
- List: Clematis eriopoda var. wilfordii (Maxim.) Kuntze; Clematis intricata var. serrata (Maxim.) Kom.; Clematis intricata var. wilfordii (Maxim.) Kom.; Clematis orientalis var. serrata Maxim.; Clematis orientalis var. wilfordii Maxim.; Clematis serrata (Maxim.) Kom.; Clematis serratifolia f. wilfordii (Maxim.) Kitag.; Clematis taeguensis Y.N.Lee; Clematis wilfordii (Maxim.) Kom.

= Clematis serratifolia =

Species of plant

Clematis serratifolia, the Korean clematis, is a species of flowering plant in the family Ranunculaceae, native to Khabarovsk and Primorsky Krais of the Russian Far East, Manchuria, and the Korean Peninsula. A deciduous climber reaching 3 to 4 m (10 to 13 ft), in the wild it is often found growing in calcareous soils, but can handle acidic soil as well. As an ornamental it is grown for its citrus-like floral aroma and its fluffy seedheads, and is recommended for courtyards, walls, borders, and the like.
