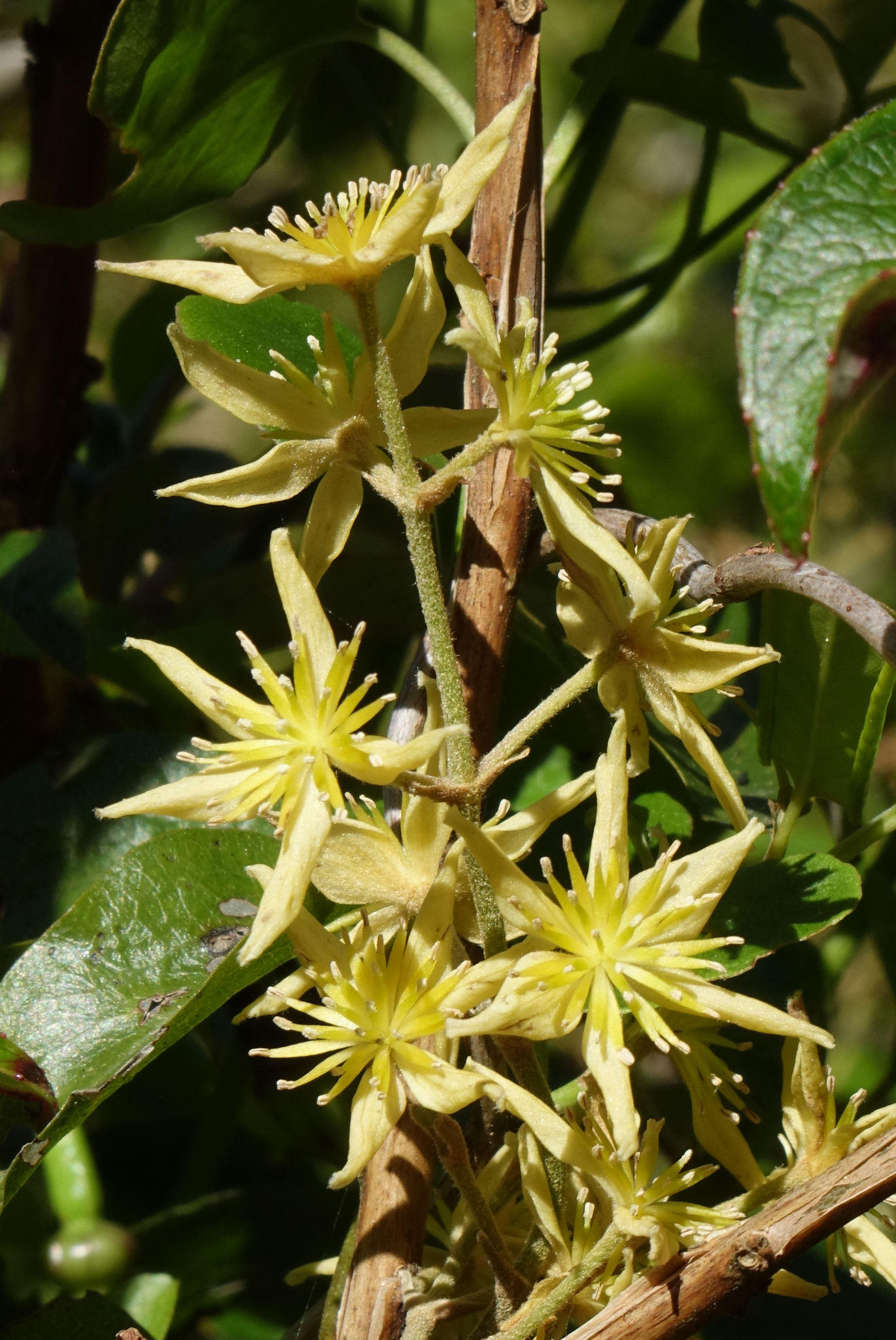

Scientific classification
- Kingdom: Plantae
- Clade: Tracheophytes
- Clade: Angiosperms
- Clade: Eudicots
- Order: Ranunculales
- Family: Ranunculaceae
- Genus: Clematis
- Species: C. foetida

Binomial name
- Clematis foetida Raoul (1846)

= Clematis foetida =

Species of plant

Clematis foetida is a New Zealand endemic vine. Contrary to its scientific name C. foetida, its flowers are pleasantly perfumed.

== Description ==
Clematis foetida is an evergreen woody climber vine, with flowers that are pale yellow-green. The flowers on this clematis grow in clusters and can become around 2-3 cm across. The colour and size of the Clematis flowers are one of its main identifying features. The scent of the clematis when flowering is very strong and sweet which is another main identifying feature. The female plant produces a large number of achenes per flower which appear as rounded white clumps of seeds. Each leaf of Clematis foetida has three leaflets in opposite position, with orange-yellow hairs on the underside of the leaf. The margins of the leaves are smooth in adults, and wavy or toothed in juveniles. The compound leaf size is approximately 2.3-5.5 cm in length and 1.8-4.5 cm in width. Adult plants have flexible woody stems with pale bark that can peel and shred, while juveniles have a smoother and softer wood stem. The length of the climber can reach up to or higher than 6 meters tall, with a trunk of approximately 6 cm in diameter.

== Range ==
=== Natural global range ===
Clematis foetida is endemic to New Zealand.

=== New Zealand range ===
Clematis foetida is found throughout the North and South Island. In the North Island, it is rare in the Taranaki region and, in the South Island, it is mainly found on the east coast.

== Habitat ==
Clematis can be found in forests, specifically those that are on lowland areas. However, it can grow in areas with elevations of up to 700m above sea level. Habitats with free-draining soil and high rainfall are optimal for growth, along with sufficient airflow and low humidity. Considering these conditions, the preferred habitat is on the edges of these lowland forests where the trees and shrubs may be smaller than the mature trees deeper in the forest. This is the preferred habitat because the areas are more open with plentiful air flow and drainage, creating better growing conditions for the Clematis foetida.

== Ecology ==
=== Life cycle and phenology ===
The dispersal of seeds is the start of new growth for Clematis foetida. Only the female plants produce seeds, in the form of white, fuzzy seed heads. This production and dispersal of seeds happens after flowering which occurs from September through to November. The lack of information regarding the pollination of Clematis foetida suggests that the flower-pollinator interactions are wide-ranging. The seeds from female Clematis foetida are spread through wind dispersal, as the light furry nature of the seed globules allows them to be carried away by the wind. This wind dispersal method is one reason why the habitat of the Clematis requires sufficient airflow. Once these seeds have been dispersed, the seeds will begin to germinate in the soil, at the end of winter, taking around two months to do so. The seed viability while still on the plant is short-term, while the viability in the soil is more long-term. Once the seeds are in the ground, germination typically takes from 2-4 months. Once the Clematis has flowered and produced its seeds, it will then fruit from November to January.

=== Diet and foraging ===
As mentioned, Clematis foetida prefers free draining soil, with a sufficient amount of rainfall. There is little research done into which specific type of soil is most suitable for Clematis foetida. Despite this, soils like podzol, pumice, and mafic brown soils all have strong soil structure that allows good drainage; therefore, it could be inferred that these may be suitable for Clematis foetida. These soils mentioned are also found throughout the areas of New Zealand where Clematis foetida grows.

=== Predators, parasites and diseases ===
There is a range of invertebrate species that are associated with Clematis foetida as either predators or parasites. There are two types of aphids, Macrosiphum euphorbiae and Aphis species ‘clematis’, that are associated with Clematis foetida. Both of these aphids appear on the leaves and suck nutrients out of the plant. Three fly species are associated with Clematis foetida. Firstly, a gall fly, which lays eggs on the leaves and creates leaf folds in the clematis. Secondly, Phytomyza vitalbae, and Phytomyza clematadi which are both known as leaf miners. These flies lay eggs on the plant, which then mine into the leaflets to pupate. Both of the populations of these species of invertebrates have been found to peak in late autumn, even when insecticide and fungicide treatments have been applied to the plant. A clematis leaf wrinkling gall mite species is known to wrinkle the leaves on the clematis. Lastly, Ctenopseustis obliquana, a species of butterfly/moth, feeds on the leaves of Clematis while they are caterpillars. Research into Clematis foetida on the Port Hills found that there may have been the larvae of another moth species, Stathmopoda, on the plant; however, no invertebrates were present so this cannot be confirmed.
