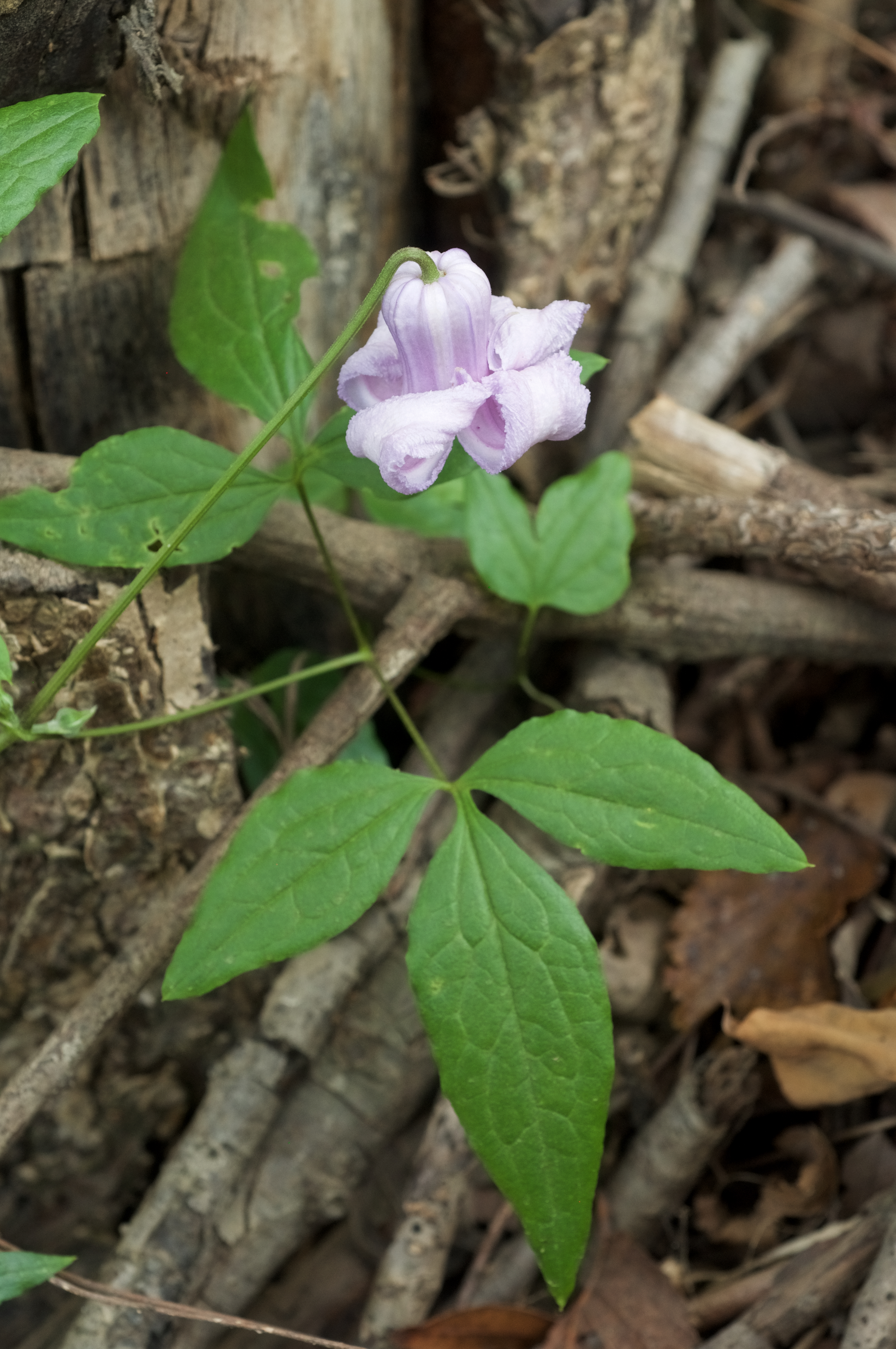

Conservation status
- Secure (NatureServe)

Scientific classification
- Kingdom: Plantae
- Clade: Tracheophytes
- Clade: Angiosperms
- Clade: Eudicots
- Order: Ranunculales
- Family: Ranunculaceae
- Genus: Clematis
- Species: C. crispa

Binomial name
- Clematis crispa L.

= Clematis crispa =

Species of flowering plant in the buttercup family

Clematis crispa is a species of flowering plant in the buttercup family known by the common name swamp leatherflower. It is found in the southeastern United States in tidal and non-tidal swamps, marshes, floodplain forests, and disturbed wet or moist areas.
