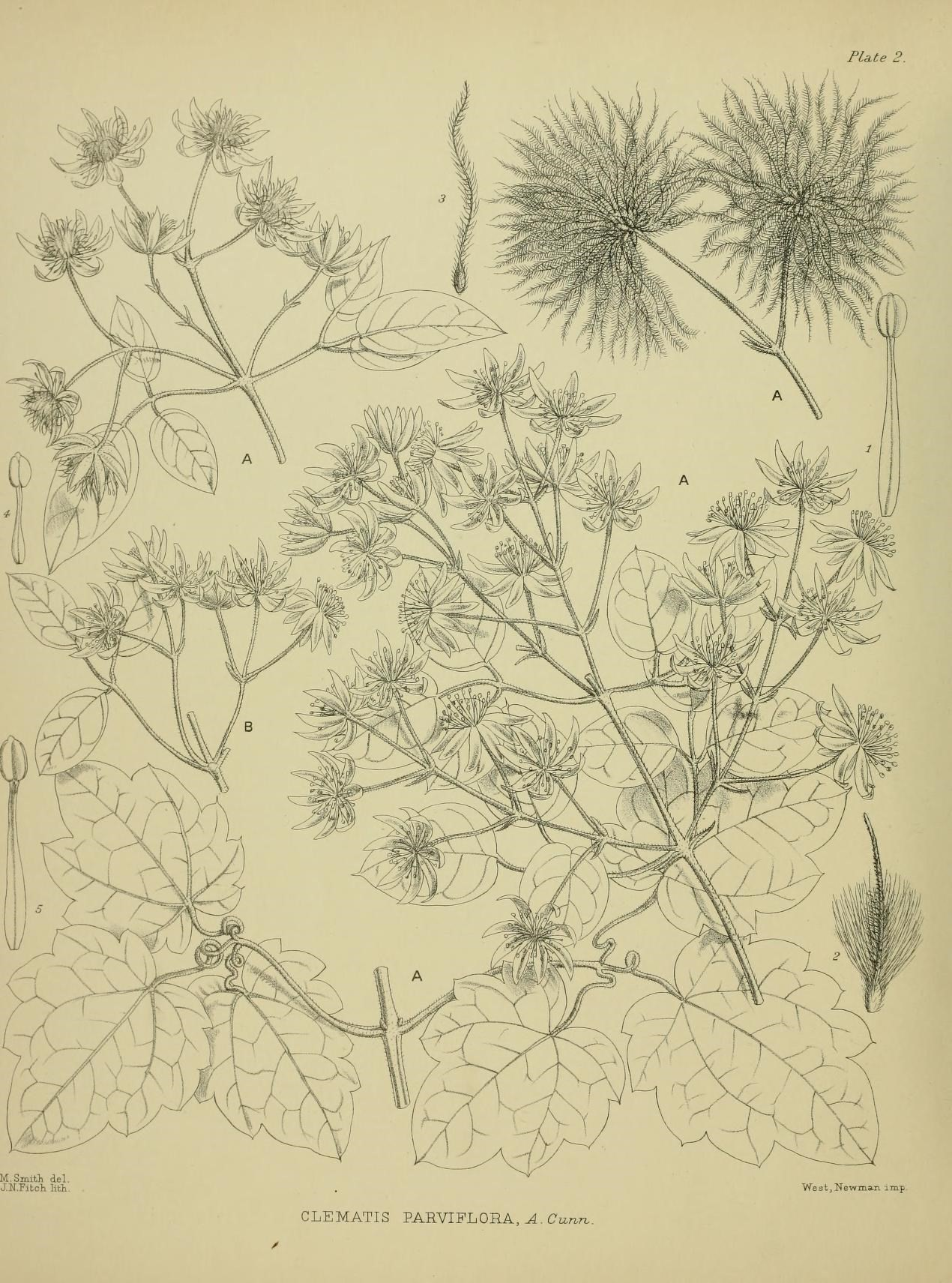

Scientific classification
- Kingdom: Plantae
- Clade: Tracheophytes
- Clade: Angiosperms
- Clade: Eudicots
- Order: Ranunculales
- Family: Ranunculaceae
- Genus: Clematis
- Species: C. cunninghamii

Binomial name
- Clematis cunninghamii Turcz.

Synonyms
- Clematis hillii Colenso, 1898; Clematis parviflora A.Cunn., 1840

= Clematis cunninghamii =

Species of flowering plant in the buttercup family

Clematis cunninghamii (in Māori: Akangākaukiore) is a species of flowering plant. It is one of seven species of clematis that is native to New Zealand. C. cunninghamii is regularly found throughout the North Island.

Clematis cunninghamii grows in lowland forests and forest margins. It produces white flowers between September and November, and fruits from November to January. Seeds are dispersed by wind.
