= Calophoma clematidina =

Scientific classification
- Kingdom: Fungi
- Division: Ascomycota
- Class: Dothideomycetes
- Order: Pleosporales
- Family: Didymellaceae
- Genus: Calophoma
- Species: C. clematidina

Binomial name
- Calophoma clematidina (Thüm.) Q. Chen & L. Cai (2015)

Synonyms
- Ascochyta clematidina Thüm. (1880); Phyllosticta clematis Brunaud (1889); Phyllosticta clematis Ellis & Dearn. (1893); Ascochyta indusiata Bres. & Hedwigia (1896); Ascochyta davidiana Kabát & Bubák (1904); Phoma clematidina Boerema (1978)

Species of fungus

Calophoma clematidina is a fungal plant pathogen and the most common cause of the disease clematis wilt affecting large-flowered varieties of Clematis. Symptoms of infection include leaf spotting, wilting of leaves, stems or the whole plant and internal blackening of the stem, often at soil level. Infected plants growing in containers may also develop root rot.

== Taxonomy ==
The asexual stage (anamorph) of the fungus was first described by the German botanist and mycologist Felix von Thümen in 1880 as Ascochyta clematidina. Based on new scientific insights into the differences in spore formation between species, it was reclassified as Phoma clematidina by the Dutch mycologist Gerhard Boerema in 1978. More recently, multi-locus phylogenetic analyses led to the fungus being reclassified again as Calophoma clematidina.

Genetic sequencing has suggested that Calophoma clematidina is heterothallic which means that two compatible strains (mating types) of the fungus would need to come together under the right environmental conditions to produce a sexual stage (teleomorph). Both mating types of Calophoma clematidina are known to occur in Europe, and yet no sexual stage (which is most likely to be a Didymella species) has ever been described.

Molecular phylogenetic analyses have revealed that some fungal isolates recovered from wild Clematis species, previously identified as Calophoma/Phoma clematidina, are in fact two closely related species of Phoma and Ascochyta with sexual stages in Didymella. Didymella clematidi has been successfully used as a biological control agent of Clematis vitalba, which is seen as an invasive plant in New Zealand. Unlike Calophoma clematidina, the two closely related Didymella species (and their anamorphs) have not been found on large-flowered Clematis varieties.

The previous misidentification of these species means that some literature referring to Calophoma clematidina or Phoma clematidina, particularly that on the biological control of C. vitalba, is actually describing work on Didymella clematidis and its Ascochyta anamorph.

The situation is further complicated by the existence of another Calophoma species known to infect Clematis: Calophoma clematidis-rectae (syn. Coniothyrium clematidis-rectae). This species is closely related to C. clematidina and has in the past been implicated in cases of clematis wilt in the Netherlands.

== Biology ==
The biology of Calophoma clematidina is now reasonably well understood thanks to research into clematis wilt at the University of Canterbury in New Zealand and the University of Derby and ADAS in the UK.

A full overview of its life cycle was first produced in 1999. Within a nursery or garden, the fungus is mainly spread through splash dispersal of its asexual spores (conidia) which are formed in bulbous fruiting bodies called pycnidia. Pycnidia can be formed on any infected part of the plant showing symptoms, including leaves, stems and roots. The pycnidia exude the spores in a sticky mass which is splash dispersed to other plants nearby during rain or irrigation. Contact, such as with pruning tools, may also spread the spores and, in addition, it is suspected that certain insect species may act as contact vectors. Movement of infected plant material forms an important method of spread to previously unaffected nurseries or gardens.

Unlike many other plant pathogens, Calophoma clematidina is not a biotroph which means that it can infect plants but does not need them to survive. The fungus can live saprophytically on dead plant material or organic matter as well. In addition, it forms thick-walled resting spores (chlamydospores) which increase its survival in plant debris and soil during unfavourable conditions.

== Disease development ==
Many publications report Calophoma clematidina to be a wound pathogen. However, although wounding may aid infection, scientific trials have shown that, in susceptible Clematis varieties, the fungus can cause extensive leaf spotting and wilt without any previous damage to plant tissues.

When spores of Calophoma clematidina land on a leaf of a susceptible plant under the right environmental conditions (moisture, temperature 15 to 25 °C (59 to 77 °F)), they will germinate within 6 hours and infect leaf tissues directly or via leaf hairs (but never via stomata). Initial symptoms are small brown lesions which then rapidly spread, eventually killing the whole leaf. Unless the plant abscises the leaf in reaction to the infection, the fungus will spread via the leaf stalk to the node of the stem.

Infection may also occur directly into the stem. This is particularly common at or below soil level where the right amounts of moisture are more likely to persist. Once in the stem, Calophoma clematidina destroys the internal tissues causing a distinctive, localised black discolouration. Such stem infections can be hugely destructive as they block the plant's vascular system and will lead to the wilting and death of all plant mass above the site of entry, no matter how substantial.

Relatively recently, it was discovered that Calophoma clematidina can also infect the roots of Clematis and be a cause of black root rot. In practice, this has been found to be a particular issue in containerised plants.

== Host susceptibility ==
Many gardening publications express a view on the susceptibility of different Clematis varieties and species to clematis wilt based on observations in practice, but very few comment on their susceptibility to disease caused by Calophoma clematidina in particular compared with other causes of wilt.

Scientific trials have shown that large-flowered varieties are especially susceptible to disease caused by Calophoma clematidina in line with their vulnerability to wilt observed in practice. It is believed that hybrids which have Clematis lanuginosa in their ancestry are most susceptible to wilt. Such hybrids include many cultivars in the early flowering, large-flowered group (such as C. 'Nelly Moser' and C. 'Elsa Späth') and, to a lesser extent, cultivars in the late flowering, large-flowered group (such as C. 'Jackmanii' and C. 'Perle d'Azur').

Clematis viticella and related varieties are also susceptible to infection with Calophoma clematidina, yet are reported to wilt less often than large-flowered varieties, possibly because they are very vigorous and outgrow infections quite rapidly. Most other cultivated Clematis species and their varieties are largely resistant to both infection with Calophoma clematidina and wilt in general.

Calophoma clematidina has sporadically been reported from species of Clematis growing in the wild, including Clematis orientalis in Russia and Clematis pubescens in Australia. Reported isolations from wild C. vitalba in Europe have proven to be an unnamed Didymella species rather than Calophoma clematidina.

== As biological control ==
This fungus has been reported as having been successfully used as a biological control agent of Clematis vitalba, which is seen as an invasive plant in New Zealand. However, further genetic studies of the isolates used in those trials have revealed that the fungus released as biocontrol agent had been misidentified and was not Calophoma clematidina, which thus far has never been found on Clematis vitalba.

== Management ==
Benzimidazole fungicides are used. Benzimidazole resistance has occurred.
