= Bagaš noble family =

Serbian noble family

Bagaš
- Country: Serbian Empire
- Founded: before 1356
- Dissolution: after 1384

The Bagaš family (Serbian: Багаш, Greek: Pagases) was a Serbian noble family that served the Serbian Kingdom and Empire.

== History ==
The word Bagaš is derived from the Old Slavic measurement with the same name.

The family hailed from Kastoria. Some scholars believe that the Bagaš family was originally from Vranje in Serbia while some other scholars believe that historical sources do not confirm it. Some scholars believe the Bagaš family was of Vlach origin.

== Members ==
- Antonije Bagaš (Antonios Pagases), nobleman, took monastic vows in Mount Athos between 1356 and 1366, taking the name Arsenios (Arsenije). He bought and restored the ruined Athonite monastery of Saint Paul with the help of Nikola Radonja and became its abbott.
- Nikola Bagaš (Nicholas Baldouin Pagases), nobleman, donated the monastery of Mesonesiotissa near Kastoria, Kastoria, together with villages, churches and other property to the monastery his brother Antonije in 1384. He was married to the daughter of Radoslav Hlapen.

There were several Serbian noblemen to which Antonije and Nikola might be related, such as Baldovin and Župan Maljušat, son of knez Baldovin who controlled region of Vranje. Based on Nikola's surname (Baldovin Bagaš) some scholars concluded that they were indeed related.
