= Monuments Museum (Kastoria) =

Museum in Kastoria, Greece

Kastoria Monuments Museum
- Μουσείο Μνημείων Καστοριάς
- Established: 1991
- Location: Kastoria, Greece
- Coordinates: 40.51930°N 21.26872°E
- Type: Scale model collection
- Founder: Nikos Pistikos

Kastoria Monuments Museum (Greek: Μουσείο Μνημείων Καστοριάς) is a private museum that displays scale models of the monuments of Kastoria, Greece. It is located on the ground floor of an apartment building on the shore of Kastoria lake.

== History ==
For many years, Nikos Pistikos devoted his free time to making scale models of the monuments of Kastoria out of a variety of materials, having first carried out on-the-spot investigations, taken measurements so that his models would be to scale, and photographed each building so that he could reproduce its distinctive features and details.

Out of love for art and for the city of Kastoria, Pistikos began to display his work to the public in 1991, at 89 Megalou Alexandrou Street. The museum includes models of old town houses, Byzantine churches, the monasteries of the surrounding area, the lakeside settlement at Dispilio, a model of the entire city and copies of the vitraux, the colourful stained glass that adorned the old town houses in Kastoria.

Early in 2000, the museum was scheduled to move to the Kastor Hotel at the entrance to the city. Today located, beside to Byzantine Museum of Kastoria, at 14 Northern Epirus Street.

== Gallery ==
Old museum gallery

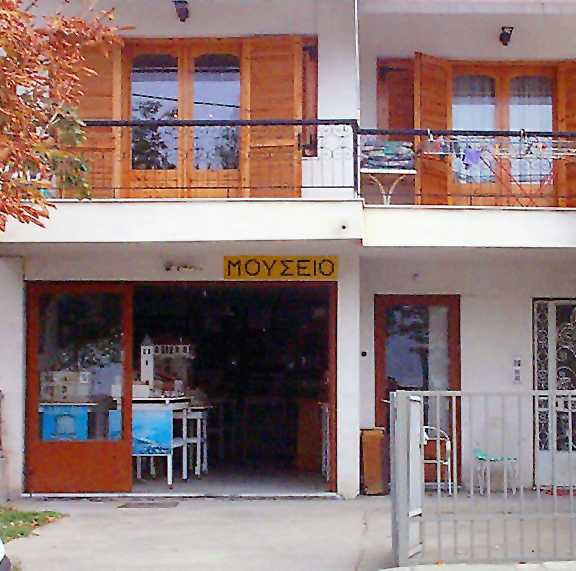
Outside view

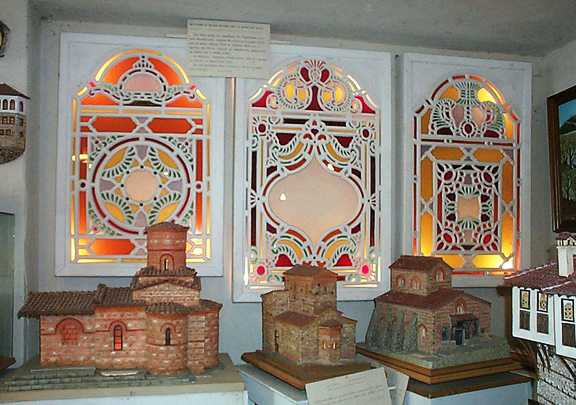
Copies of the vitraux and Byzantine churches

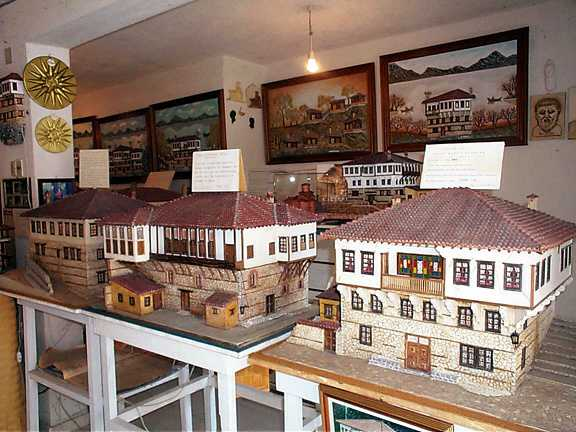
Old town houses of Kastoria

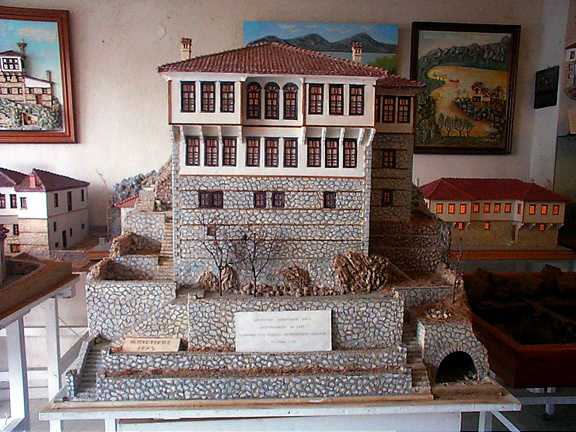
Old town house of Kastoria
