= Lake Orestiada =

Lake in Macedonia, Greece

- Lake of Kastoria
- Λίμνη Ορεστιάδα (Greek)
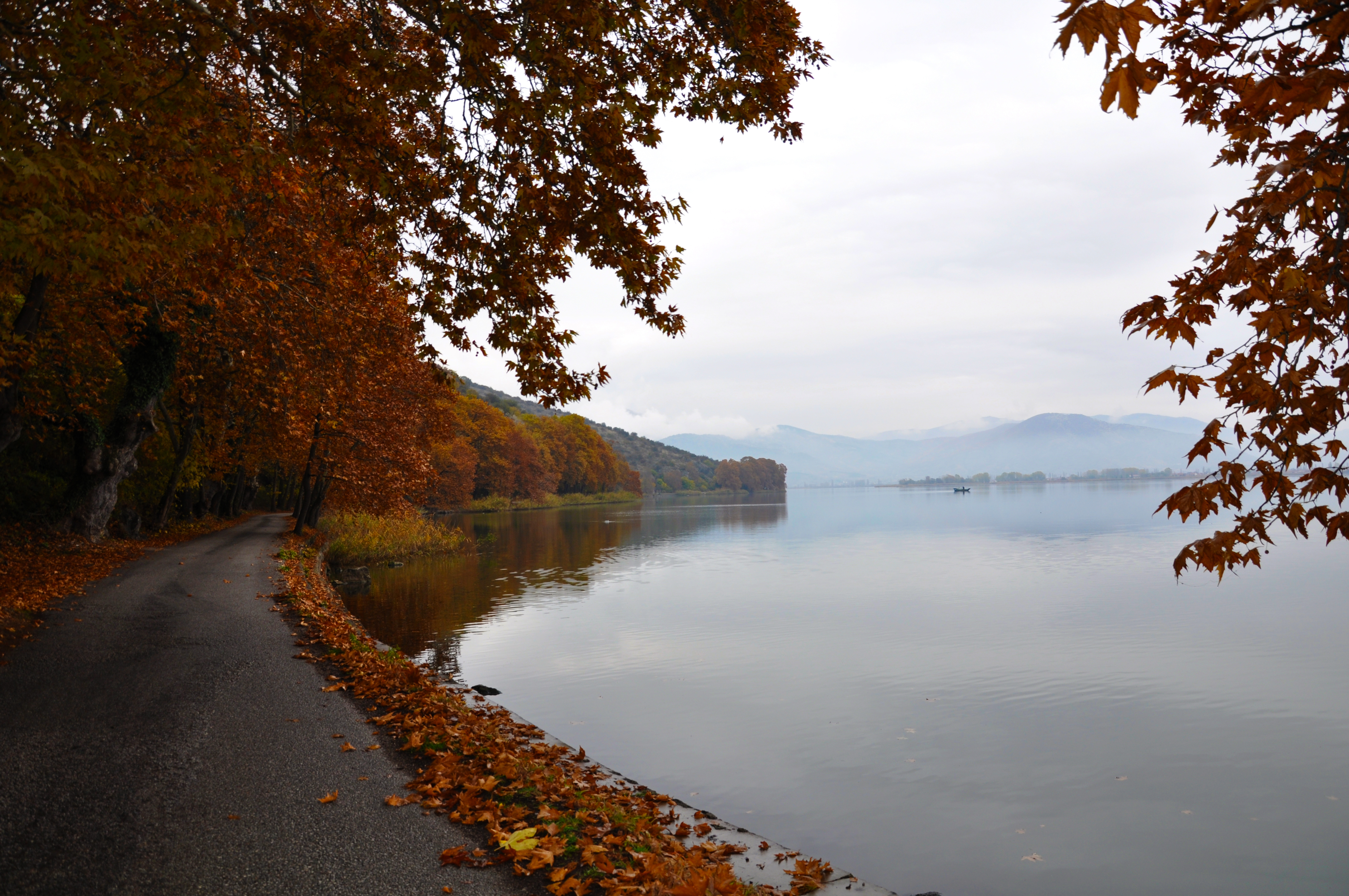
- Lake of Kastoria

- Location within Greece
- Location: Kastoria regional unit, Macedonia, Greece
- Coordinates: 40°30′54″N 21°18′00″E
- Basin countries: Greece
- Surface area: 28 km^{2} (11 sq mi)
- Surface elevation: 630 m (2,070 ft)

Lake Orestiada or Lake of Kastoria (Greek: Λίμνη Ορεστιάδα) is a lake in the Kastoria regional unit of Macedonia, northwestern Greece. It spreads out in a natural basin, surrounded by mountains and is the remnant of a huge ancient Miocene lake that reached an area of 164 square kilometres and at a depth of 50 meters. Sitting at an altitude of 630 metres, the lake covers an area of 28 square kilometres with a coastline that reaches 34 km. The maximum depth of the lake reaches about 9 meters and the average depth 4.5 meters.

To the north-east rises Mount Vitsi, to the north-west Mount Triklarios and to the south-west spread the foothills of Voios. Lake Orestiada is mainly refreshed by the waters that descend from Mount Vitsi through Xiropotamos on the eastern banks, but also by smaller streams, such as Aposkepos, Foudouklis, Istakos, Fotini, Metamorfosi, Toichi, Agios Athanasios and Vyssinia.

Its catchment area reaches 267 square kilometres.

Nine rivulets flow into the lake, and it drains into the Haliacmon river, via the small Gioli stream. Its depth varies from nine to ten metres. To the west, the Kastoria Peninsula (with the town of Kastoria) divides the lake into two parts, the larger to the north and the smaller to the south, giving the lake its characteristic kidney shape.

The lake takes its name from the Oreiades. Lakeside attractions include, apart from the Byzantine architectural heritage of the town, an 11th-century Byzantine monastery of Panagia Mavriotissa and the reconstructed prehistoric settlement of Dispilio, where the Dispilio Tablet was retrieved from the lake in 1992. The lake is known to freeze in winters, for 2 to 5 weeks.

Orestiada is surrounded by wooded hills, wet meadows, reedbeds, lakeside forests, marshes and fields, habitats that support a rich birdlife. It is a eutrophic lake, which is due to agricultural waste from crops and chronic pollution from the city's municipal sewage.

To the north-west of the lake stretches a lakeside forest of willows, poplars and alders. To the east and south, reside seasonal wetlands and reedbeds of reeds. Around the perimeter of the lake, burla and mats grow.

Dominant trees around the lake are sycamores with the vegetation complemented by elms, cranberries, blackberries and wild roses. Aquatic plants include most honorably the water chestnut Water caltrop (or Trapa natans), the Najas marina sub-species major, Stuckenia pectinata, Potamogeton species, including Potamogeton crispus water lilies, Potamogeton natans, Potamogeton perfoliatus and Potamogeton lucens, Azolla filiculoides, the hornworts Ceratophyllum demersum and Ceratophyllum submersum, Persicaria amphibia, Myriophyllum spicatum, water lilies Nymphaea alba and Nuphar lutea, Hydrocharis morsus-ranae, Lemna gibba, Spirodela polyrhiza among many.

The flora around the lake and on the peninsula includes rare species. In this category, are featured the lily species Lilium candidum and Galeopsis ladanum the iris species Iris pseudacorus, Stachys palustris, the Leucojum aestivum aestivum sub-species, as well as the aquatic plant sub-species of Delphinium balcanicum and Butomus umbellatus.

In the surrounding hills, blooms the rare sub-species Pulsatilla halleri. Other plants of the region feature the Centaurea graeca centaurea species, the Scutellaria galericulata perennial herb sub-species, the Paronychia macedonica sub-species of paronychia plants, the Campanula versicolor variant, Althaea officinalis, Verbascum flavidum, Clematis viticella clematis sub-species, Alisma plantago-aquatica Rorippa amphibia, Oenanthe aquatica, Eleocharis palustris, Lythrum salicaria, Galium palustre, Veronica anagallis-aquatica, Mentha aquatica, Nasturtium officinale (or Watercress), the Sparganium erectum sparganium perennial plant sub-species, and Helosciadium nodiflorum among many.

Lake Orestiada marks more than 200 species of birds to have been observed, 90 of which breed here.

Pelican sub-species, such as the silver pelican, the rose pelican, geese sub-species such as gray goose and heron species are important.

In Lake Orestiada, resides the largest breeding place of the mute swan in Greece.

Predators include vultures and its sub-species of griffon vultures, spotted vultures, reed vultures, meadow vultures, winter vultures. Other birds, such as buzzards, hawks, falcons, sledgehammers, rock kestrels, black kestrels, harrier sub-species including dwarf harriers, tree harriers and peregrines

Nocturnal raptors include owls and its sub-species of pygmy owls, other birds such as buzzards. Among ducks, rare coots, barbarians, teals, whistlings, sardines, grebes, mallards and black-headed ducks also live here.

== Pictures ==
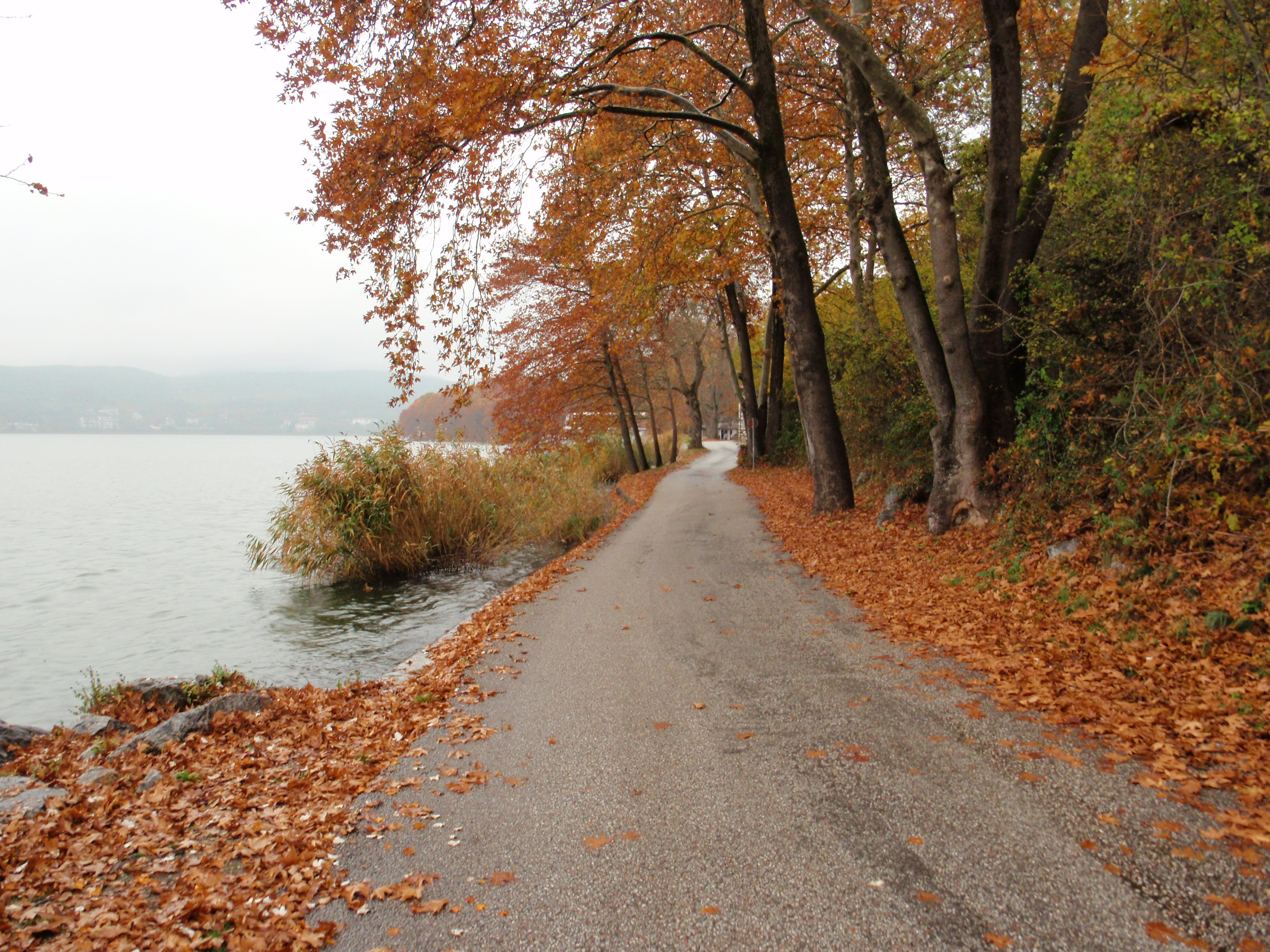
Road close to the lake

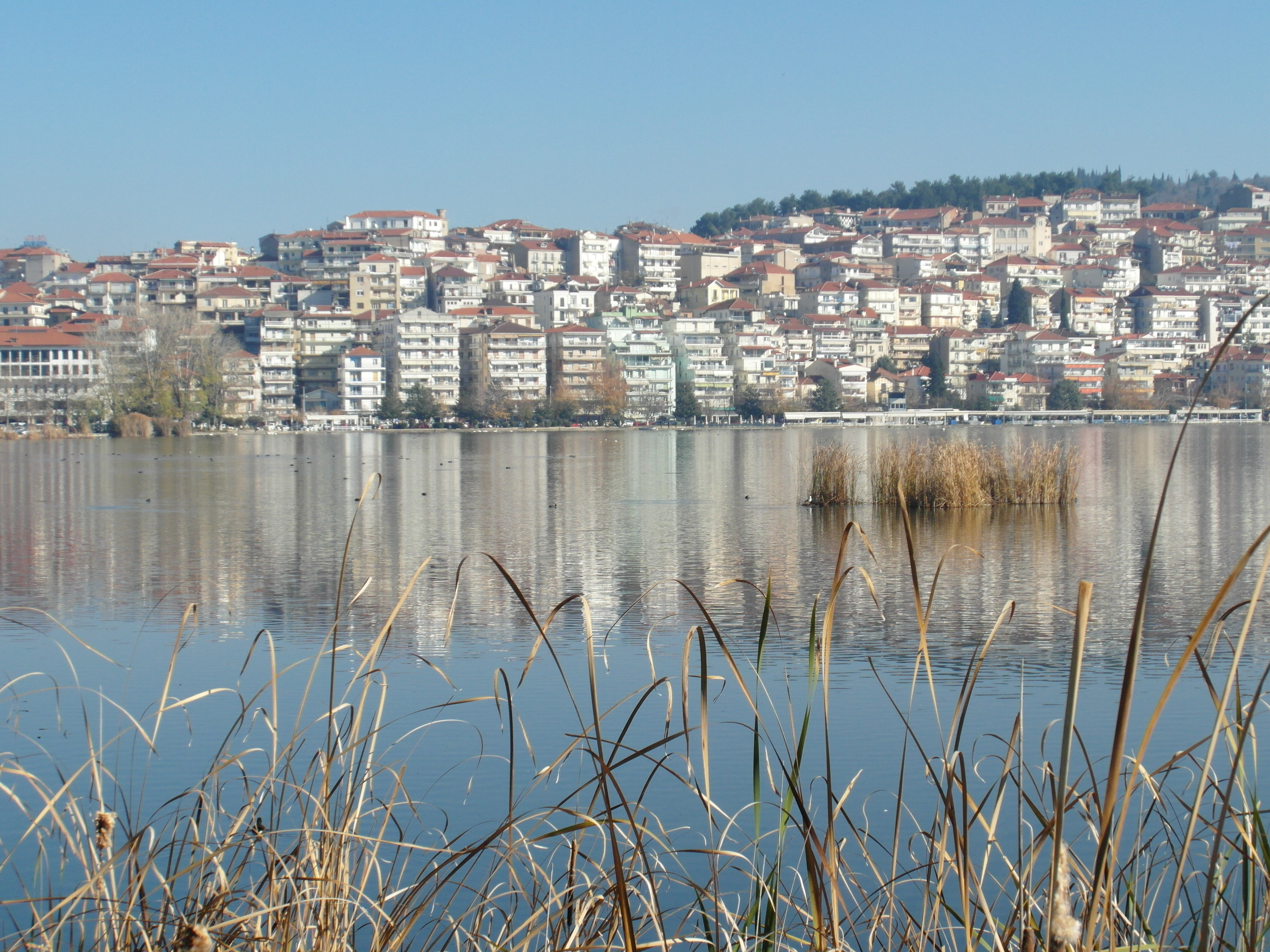
View to the town

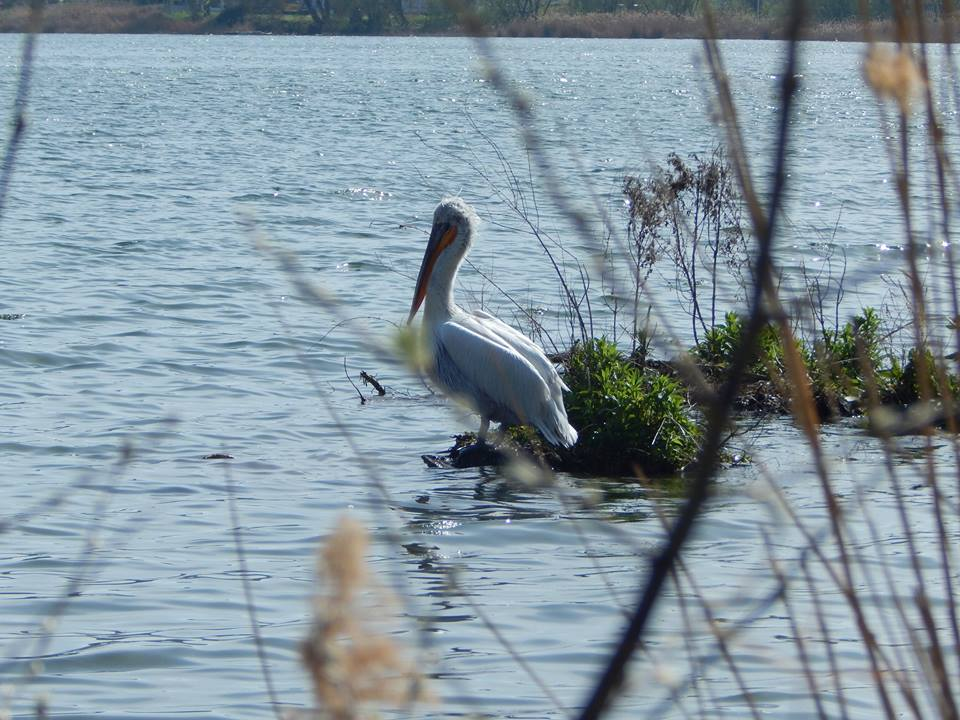
Dalmatian pelican at lake Orestiada

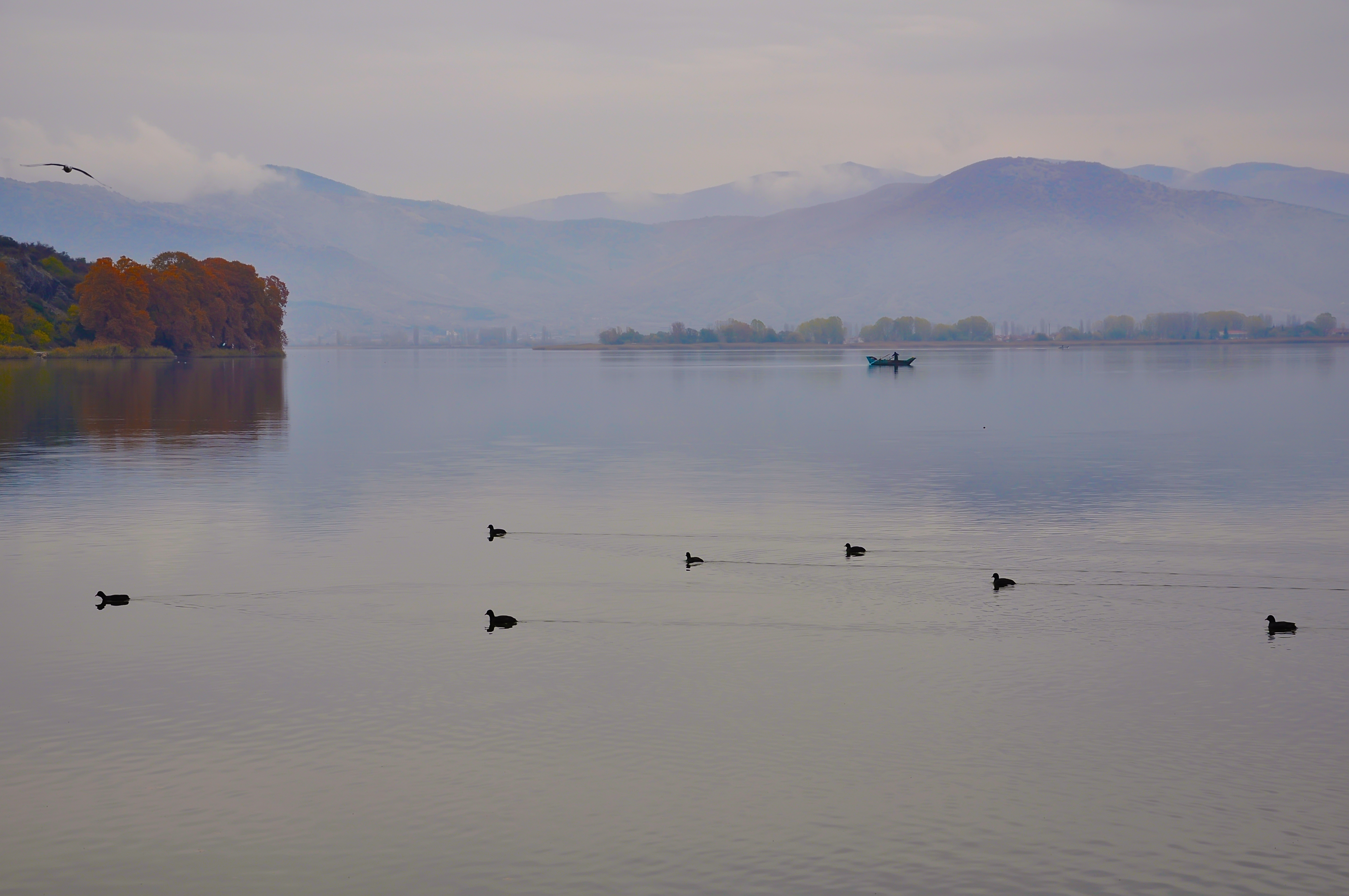
Eurasian coots at lake Orestiada

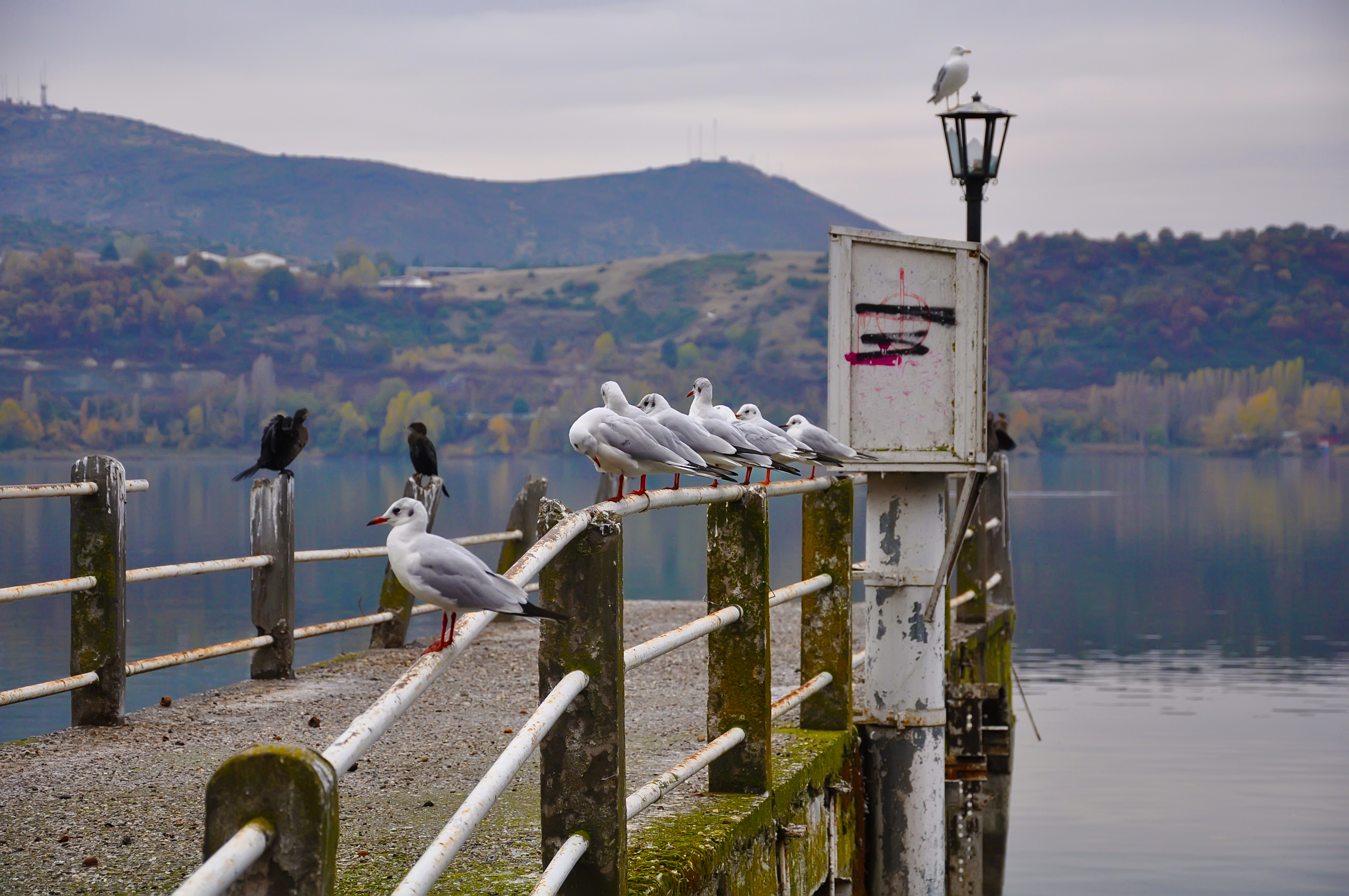
Black headed gulls at lake Orestiada

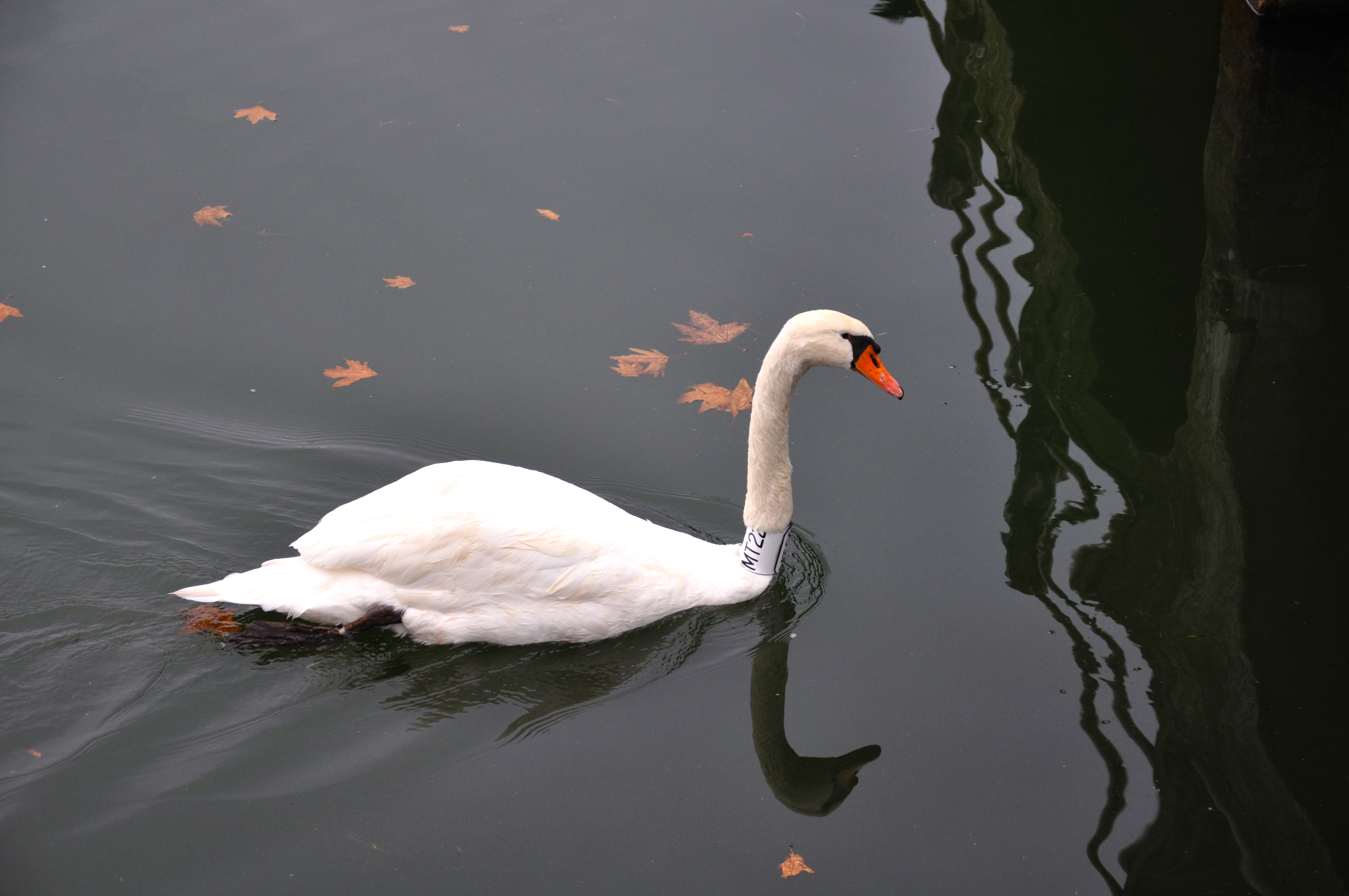
Mute swan swimming at lake Orestiada

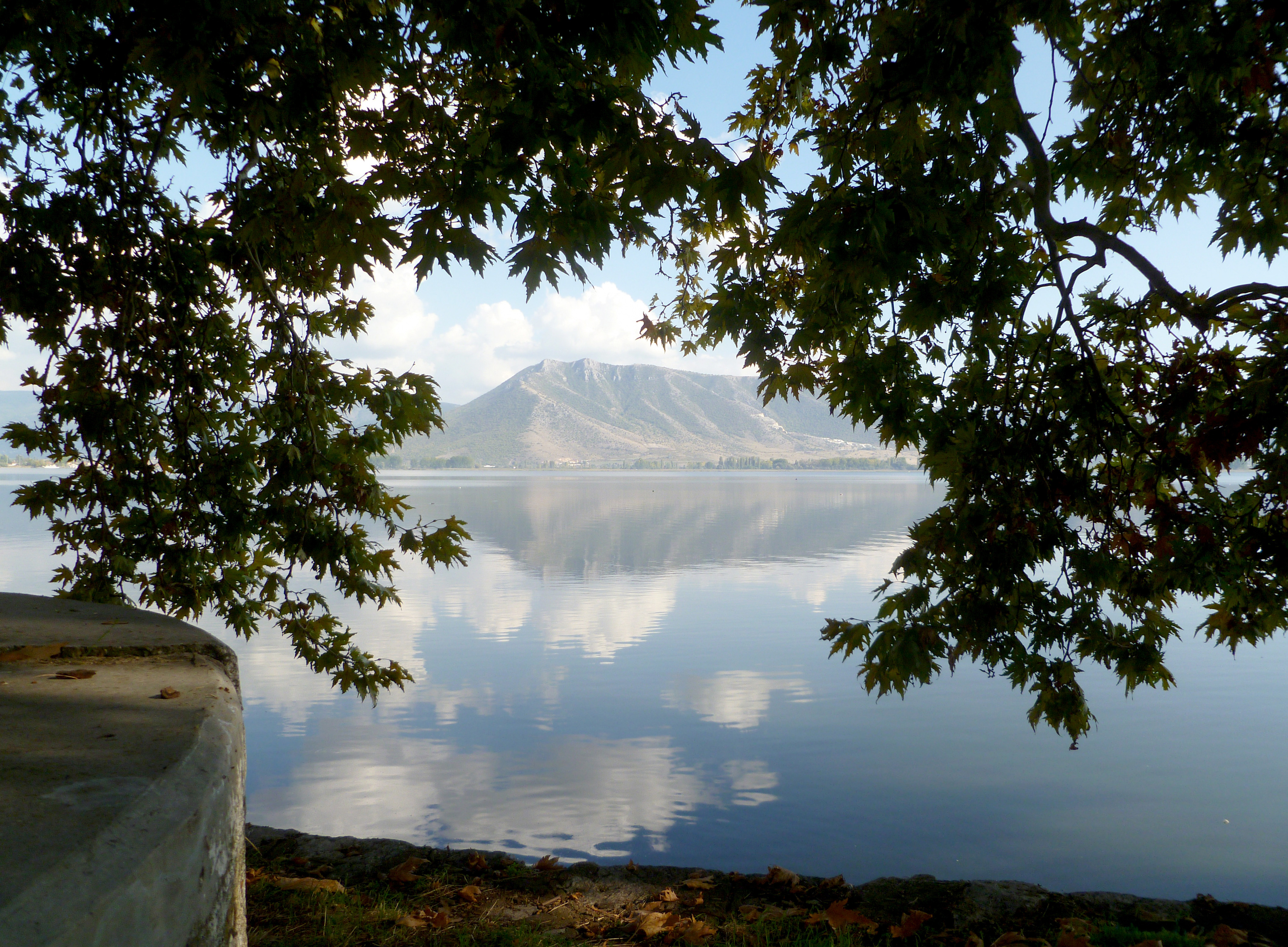
View to the lake

== See also ==
- Battle of Lake Kastoria (1941)
- Krepeni
- Mavrochori
- Monastery of Panagia Mavriotissa

== Bibliography ==
- 1830 Map
- Λίμνη Ορεστιάδα
