= Mavrochori =

Village in Macedonia, Greece

- Community
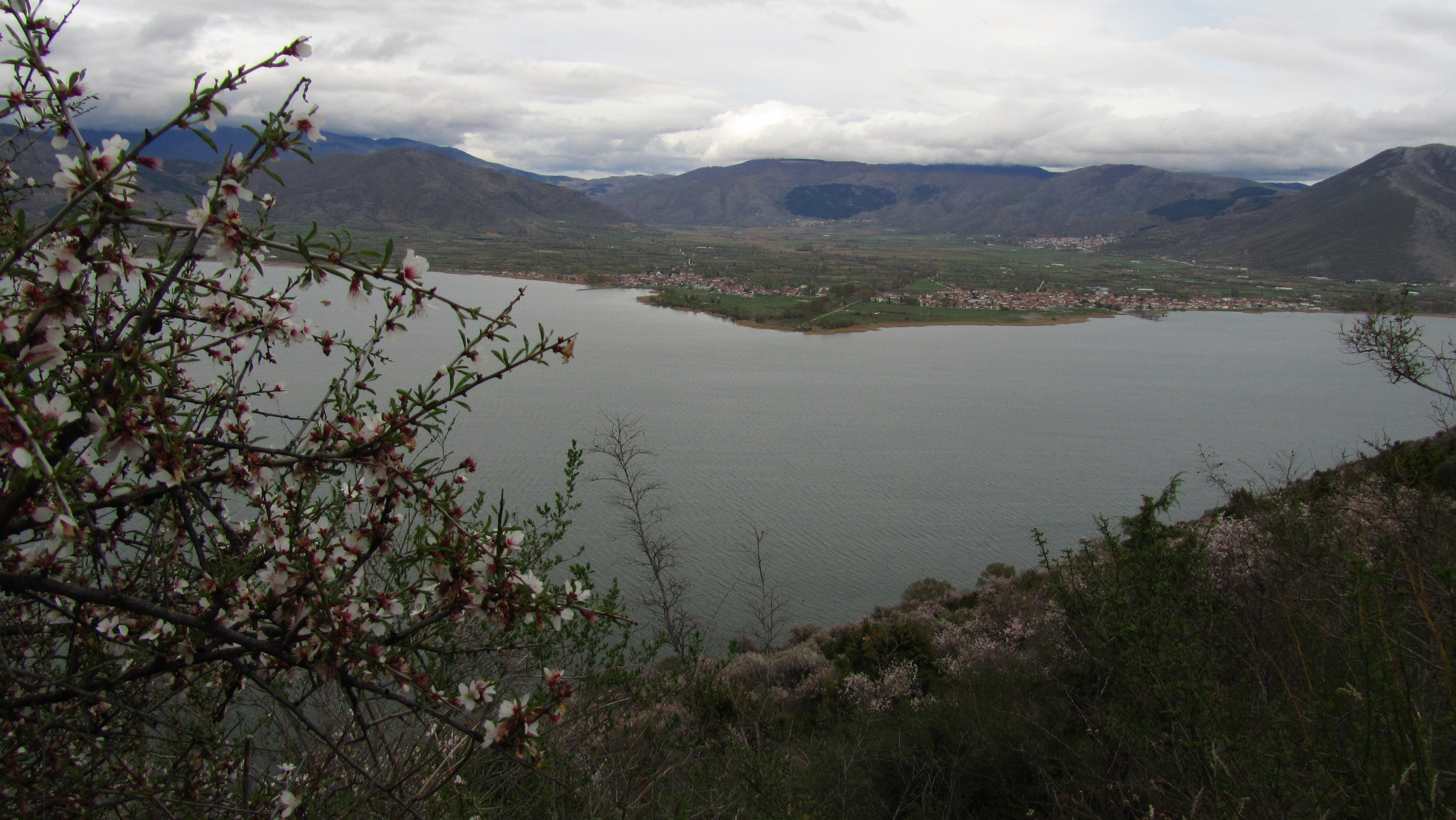
- Mavrochori (left), Polykarpi (right)

- Location within Greece
- Coordinates: 40°30′44″N 21°19′13″E
- Country: Greece
- Geographic region: Macedonia
- Administrative region: Western Macedonia
- Regional unit: Kastoria
- Municipality: Kastoria
- Municipal unit: Makednoi

Population (2021)
  - Community: 1,379
- Time zone: UTC+2 (EET)
  - Summer (DST): UTC+3 (EEST)

Mavrochori (Greek: Μαυροχώρι(οv), meaning "black village"; before 1928: Μαύροβον – Mavrovon) is a village on the shores of Lake Orestiada in Kastoria regional unit of Macedonia, Greece.

Today Mavrochori is a tourist destination for a quiet vacation near the lake of Kastoria. In addition to the trade fair, festive events take place on the 13th - 15 August of the Assumption of Mary, where the Monastery of Panagia Mavriotissa celebrates (it was built by General George Palaiologos in commemoration of the victory against the Normans in 1083). The Mavrochori Nautical Club also operates in the village.

== History ==
It was in existence at least from 1380 and is denoted, under the name Mavrobo, in the British Baldwin & Craddock Map of Greece which was published on 1 January 1830. The name Mavros, together with the name Krepeni, is found in a title deed executed by Serbian nobleman Nikola Bagaš.

In the end of the 18th century the patriarch of the Mavrovitis family moved his people from the nearby Krepeni village to Mavrovo in order to avoid a plague pandemic, and it is believed that people were frequently moving between Krepeni and Mavrovo.

The Monastery of Panagia Mavriotissa, originally named Mesonisiotissa (meaning "in the middle of the island"), was built near the village.

Mavrochori had a historical relationship with both the Mavriotissa monastery as well as with the nearby village of Krepeni.

During Ottoman rule, Mavrovo was populated by Christians and Muslims, it had one Greek school and one Muslim school and five inns. The 1920 Greek census recorded 1,062 people in the village, and 450 inhabitants (45 families) were Muslim in 1923. Following the Greek–Turkish population exchange, Greek refugee families in Mavrovo were from Asia Minor (55), Pontus (19) and one other from an unidentified location in 1926. The 1928 Greek census recorded 1,065 village inhabitants. In 1928, the refugee families numbered 72 (320 people). There were two mosques and two Muslim cemeteries in the village, later all destroyed.

== Notable people ==
- Konstantinos Papastavrou, Greek chieftain of the Macedonian Struggle
- Filippos Petsalnikos, Greek politician, served as Speaker of the Hellenic Parliament
