= Clematis 'Jackmanii' =

Vine cultivar

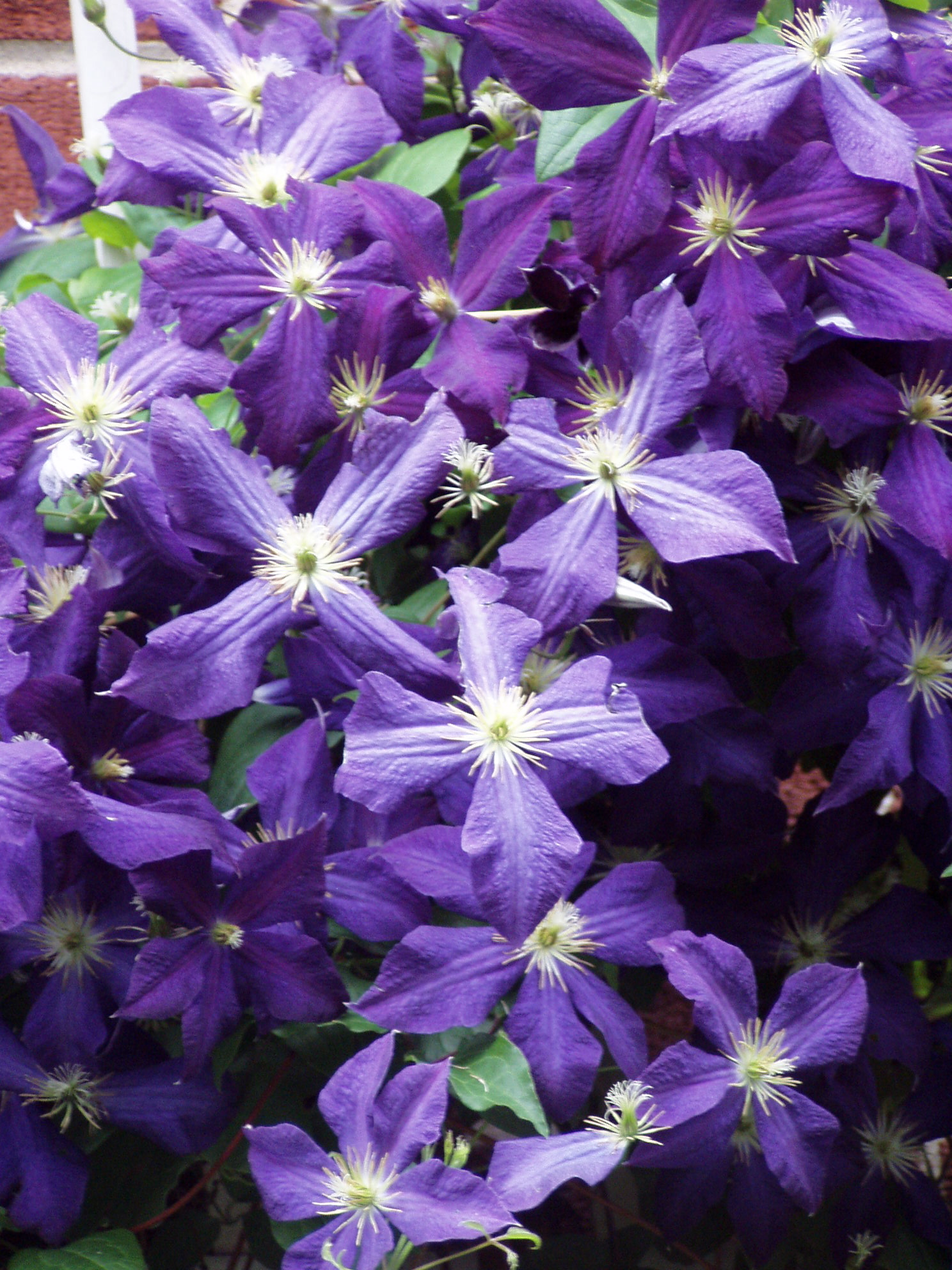
- Genus: Clematis
- Species: C. × jackmanii
- Hybrid parentage: C. lanuginosa × C. viticella
- Cultivar group: Clematis viticella group
- Cultivar: Jackmanii
- Breeder: George Jackman

Clematis 'Jackmanii' is a Clematis cultivar which, when it was introduced in 1862, was the first of the modern large-flowered hybrid clematises of gardens. It is a climber with large violet-purple blooms, still among the most familiar climbers seen in gardens. It was produced from crosses made by the prominent nurseryman George Jackman (1837–1887), of Jackman & Sons, Woking, Surrey.

C. 'Jackmanii' arose from crosses made in 1858 between Clematis lanuginosa, the red form of C. viticella, and an earlier garden hybrid, Clematis × hendersonii, which the new hybrid eclipsed. The spectacular success of 'Jackmanii' encouraged Jackman & Sons to introduce a series of clematis hybrids, although none of these ousted 'Jackmanii' from favour. Jackman also produced a monograph, The Clematis as a Garden Flower (with T. Moore, 1872), which he dedicated to H.S.H. Princess Mary, Duchess of Teck, as the clematis was one of her favourite flowers.

Few of Jackman's early hybrids survive today, in part because they were grafted, often on 'Jackmanii', but the dependable, floriferous and hardy 'Jackmanii' itself remains one of the most popular clematises of North American farmyard gardens in the East and the Midwest, where it is hardy to USDA Zone 4a; it is seen grown on trellis, fence, arbor, porch pillar, or lamppost, wherever the soil retains some moisture and the roots are shaded, even if only by a large flat rock. The plant flowers on the year's new growth, so pruning is best done in early spring, before the plant leafs out. Cut to the ground the plant can reach 3 metres (10 ft) during the season; a column of bloom can be achieved by pruning out stems at varying heights, some as low as four buds, others above head height.

== Clematis wilt ==
Prior to the introduction of 'Jackmanii', the disease clematis wilt was little known and not widespread. However, because 'Jackmanii' was bred from C. lanuginosa (a species which is susceptible to the pathogen which causes the disease), and because 'Jackmanii' led to a series of similar hybrids and the popularisation of the genus, clematis wilt soon became a serious problem for the new Clematis nurseries, to such an extent that by 1880 it had "brought the industry to a halt". Clematis wilt is still prevalent today, although many species and cultivars grown in gardens are resistant to it.
