= Konstantinos Papastavrou =

Kapetan (Chieftain) Konstantinos Papastavrou
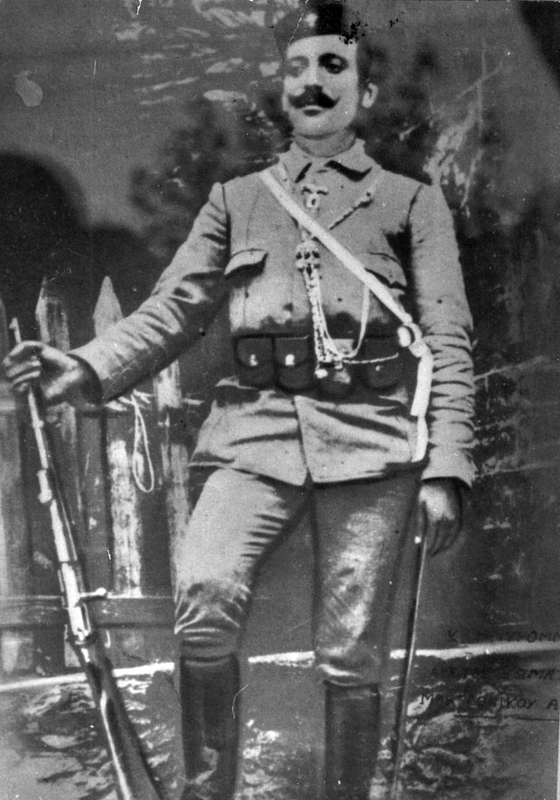
- Papastavrou during the Macedonian Struggle.
- Native name: Κωνσταντίνος Παπασταύρου
- Nickname(s): Kapetan Mavromatis (Καπετάν Μαυρομάτης)
- Born: c. 1880s Mavrovo, Monastir Vilayet, Ottoman Empire (now Mavrochori, Greece)
- Allegiance: Kingdom of Greece
- Service / branch: HMC
- Battles / wars: Macedonian Struggle

Konstantinos Papastavrou (Greek: Κωνσταντίνος Παπασταύρου), known with the nickname Mavromatis (Μαυρομάτης, "Black-eye") was a Greek chieftain of the Macedonian Struggle.

== Biography ==
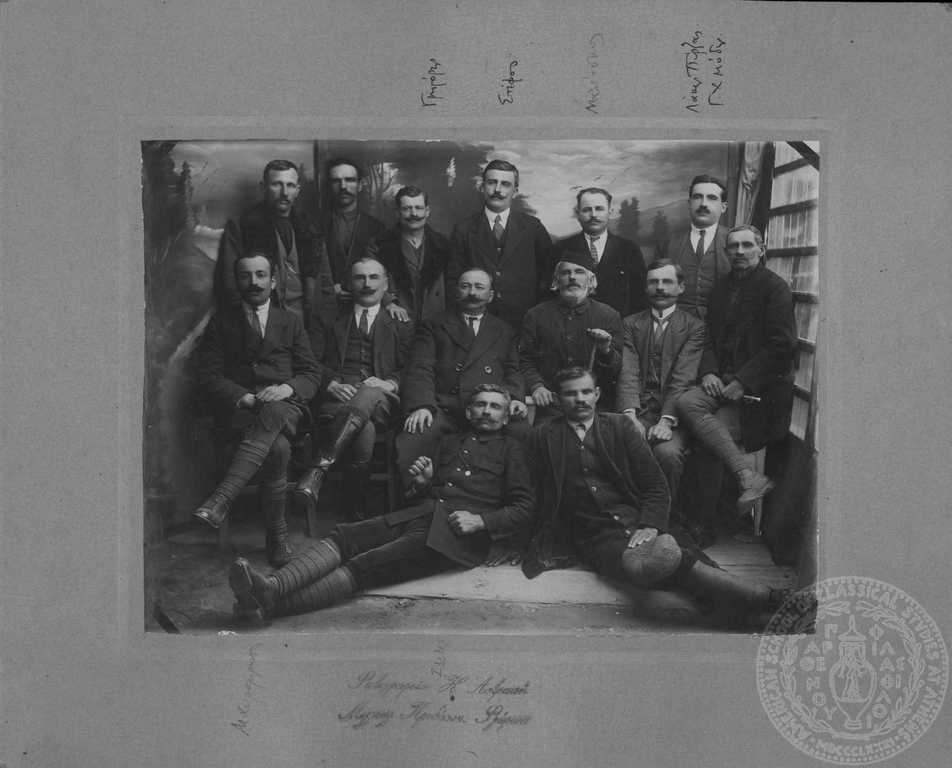
Konstantinos Papastavrou with other local chieftains of the Macedonian Struggle from North-Western Macedonia

Papastavrou was born in the 1880s in Mavrovo (now Mavrochori) in Kastoria. Because of his characteristic eyes, he received the nickname "Mavromatis" meaning "Black-eyed".

=== Armed action ===
He set up his own armed group, consisting of local Greeks of Mavrovo and other villages nearby and acted in the regions of Kastoria, Eordaia and Amyntaio during throughout the Macedonian Struggle against Bulgarian komitadjis and specific Ottoman targets. His body consisted of around 45 men.

He collaborated with chieftains Alexandros Georgiadis and Stergios Kountouras on several occasions.

== Sources ==
- Ιωάννης Σ. Κολιόπουλος (editor), Αφανείς, γηγενείς Μακεδονομάχοι, Εταιρεία Μακεδονικών Σπουδών, University Studio Press, Thessaloniki, 2008, p. 81, 101
- Χαροκόπειο Πανεπιστήμιο Αθηνών, Τμήμα Οικιακής Οικονομίας και Οικολογίας, Πτυχιακή Μελέτη: Η παραδοσιακή οικογένεια και η παραδοσιακή οικιακή οικονομία στο νομό Καστοριάς, το Μαυροχώρι, Σοφία Σπυροπούλου, Athens 2005
