= Nikola Bagaš =

14th century Serbian nobleman

Nikola Baldovin Bagaš
- Lord (Serbian: Господар) or Župan of Voden
- Reign: 1375–1385
- Predecessor: Radoslav Hlapen
- Family: Bagaš
- spouse: daughter of Radoslav Hlapen

Nikola Bagaš (Serbian: Никола Багаш, Latin: Nicholas Baldouin Pagases), or Nikola Baldovin Bagaš (fl. 1354–1385), was a 14th-century Serbian nobleman from the Bagaš noble family, lord (župan) of Voden.

== Biography ==
In 1384, before his region would be completely annexed to the Ottoman Empire, Bagaš donated the monastery of Mesonesiotissa near Edessa, together with villages, churches and other property, to the Athonite monastery of Saint Paul (Agiou Pavlou) based on the request of his brother Antonije. In the document made on that occasion Bagaš did not use any title for himself. He was married to the daughter of Radoslav Hlapen and received Voden (modern day Edessa in Greece) a dowry probably around 1366–7. Before 1385, Bagaš became a vassal of the Ottoman sultan Murad I. During the summer or autumn of 1385, Bagaš had to surrender Edessa to the Ottomans. On that occasion, the city, like most of the places that offered no resistance, was not destroyed.

== Footnotes ==
1. Many earlier historical sources mistakenly connected Nikola Bagaš with Kastoria, based on the wrong interpretation of one of primary sources, his charter by which he granted Mesonesiotissa monastery
