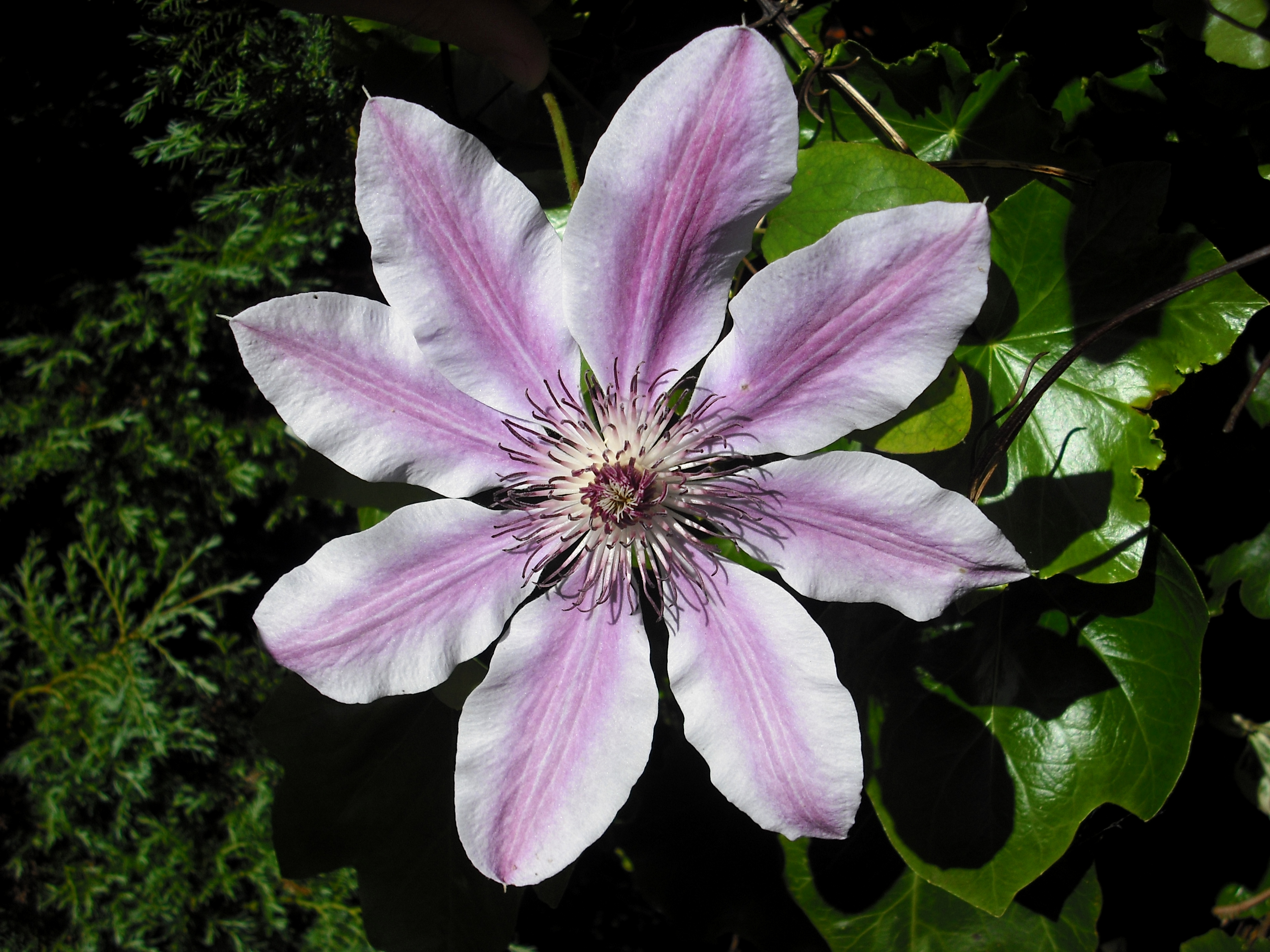
- "Nelly Moser" hybrid cultivar

Scientific classification
- Kingdom: Plantae
- Clade: Tracheophytes
- Clade: Angiosperms
- Clade: Eudicots
- Order: Ranunculales
- Family: Ranunculaceae
- Genus: Clematis
- Species: C. lanuginosa

Binomial name
- Clematis lanuginosa Lindl.

= Clematis lanuginosa =

Species of flowering plant in the buttercup family

Clematis lanuginosa is a flowering vine of the genus Clematis. Like many members of that genus, its hybrids are prized by gardeners for their showy flowers. It is endemic to Zhejiang province in eastern China and was first discovered near Ningbo by the plant hunter Robert Fortune in 1850 who sent plants back to England. It was lost to cultivation at about the time of the first world war and thought to be extinct but was rediscovered growing in the same area in 2008.

Clematis lanuginosa is a twice-bearing clematis that blooms once in spring and again in summer. In the US it grows best in American Horticultural Society zones 9 to 1, which covers much of the US. It is best known as a parent species for many of the large-flowered varieties of Clematis. One example of these would be Jackman's Clematis C. jackmanii. The cultivar 'Candida' has 8-inch white blossoms.

== Clematis wilt ==
Clematis lanuginosa is one of the species of Clematis that is susceptible to the fungal plant pathogen Phoma clematidina, which produces the sometimes fatal disease known commonly as "clematis wilt". As C. lanuginosa and hybrids derived from it have been used extensively in the breeding of new large flowered Clematis cultivars, this susceptibility to the disease has been passed to many Clematis commonly grown in gardens.
