= Radoslav Hlapen =

Serbian magnate

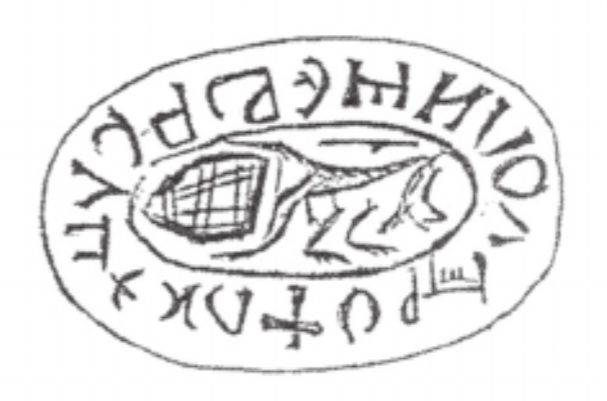
- Seal of Radoslav Hlapen with the inscription "Receive God's servant Hlpen"

Despot of Edessa and Veria
- Reign: 1371–1375
- Successor: Nikola Bagaš
- Other titles: despot, highest court title at that time pinkernes (cup-bearer) vojvoda (general) župan (count)
- Born: early 14th century Serbian Kingdom
- Died: 1379; Vodoča
- Spouse: Irina
- Issue: see list

Radoslav Hlapen (Serbian: Радослав Хлапен; fl. 1350–1379) was a Serbian magnate who served Emperor Stefan Dušan (r. 1331–1355) and Stefan Uroš V (r. 1355–71) as vojvoda (military commander). He took part in the conquest of Byzantine lands, and was given a region north of Thessaly to govern in the early 1350s.

== Origin ==
It is believed that Radoslav Hlapen is the same person as župan (count) Hlapen (Latin: Clapen) who governed Konavle and the wider Trebinje region in the 1330s. He was possibly the son of župan Radoslav, and thus named Radoslav after his father. Another theory is that he was the son of Syrgiannes Palaiologos.

Byzantine Emperor John VI Kantakouzenos (r. 1347–54) mentioned him as among the most important nobles, and he was called a relative of Dušan.

== Service under Stefan Dušan ==
Serres was captured in September 1345, Veria in the first half of 1346. Veria and the surrounding towns were recuperated by John VI Kantakuzenos. After the military conquests, perhaps by spring 1351, Hlapen returned the city to Serbian rule, with many cities and towns in the area. He was appointed governor of Edessa (Voden) and Veria (Ber), just north of Thessaly.

Emperor Dušan died in Devol, on 20 December 1355. Dušan was succeeded by his son Stefan Uroš V.

== Service under Stefan Uroš V ==
After the death of the governor of Thessaly kesar Preljub (1356), Preljub's son Thomas' claim to the region was asserted by the widow Irene. The Preljubović family was forced to flee to Serbia after the advance of Nikephoros II Orsini in 1356. Irene married Radoslav Hlapen, who adopted Thomas.

Despot Simeon Uroš Nemanjić, the brother of Dušan, was appointed governor of Epirus, Aetolia and Acarnania in 1348. Following the death of Dušan and subsequent invasion of Nikephoros II, Simeon Uroš retreated to Kastoria, where he proclaimed himself "Emperor of Serbs, Greeks and Albanians". Simeon Uroš acquired the support of John Komnenos Asen, Dušan's brother-in-law and the appointed Despot in Valona. In response, the Serbian nobility held a council in April 1357 at Skopje, in which they vowed to support Emperor Uroš V, according to Dušan's will. In the summer of 1358, Simeon Uroš advanced on Zeta but was stopped at Skadar, where his army of 5,000 men was defeated by the Serbian nobility. Simeon Uroš returned to Kastoria, and never again tried to acquire Serbia. Simeon was, however, fortunate in that Nikephoros II Orsini was slain in battle, thus giving Simeon an opportunity to rapidly seize back his former territories in Epirus, as well as former territories of caesar Preljub in Thessaly.

As Simeon was campaigning in Epirus, Hlapen invaded Thessaly on behalf of his stepson Thomas, Preljub's son. Simeon Uroš was forced to cut his losses by recognizing Radoslav Hlapen's conquests, turning over Kastoria and the region surrounding it, and marrying his daughter Maria to Thomas. Hlapen continued to recognize the suzerainty of Emperor Stefan Uroš V, and provided a buffer between him and Simeon. After the treaty between Hlapen and Simeon Uroš, the latter settled in Thessaly.

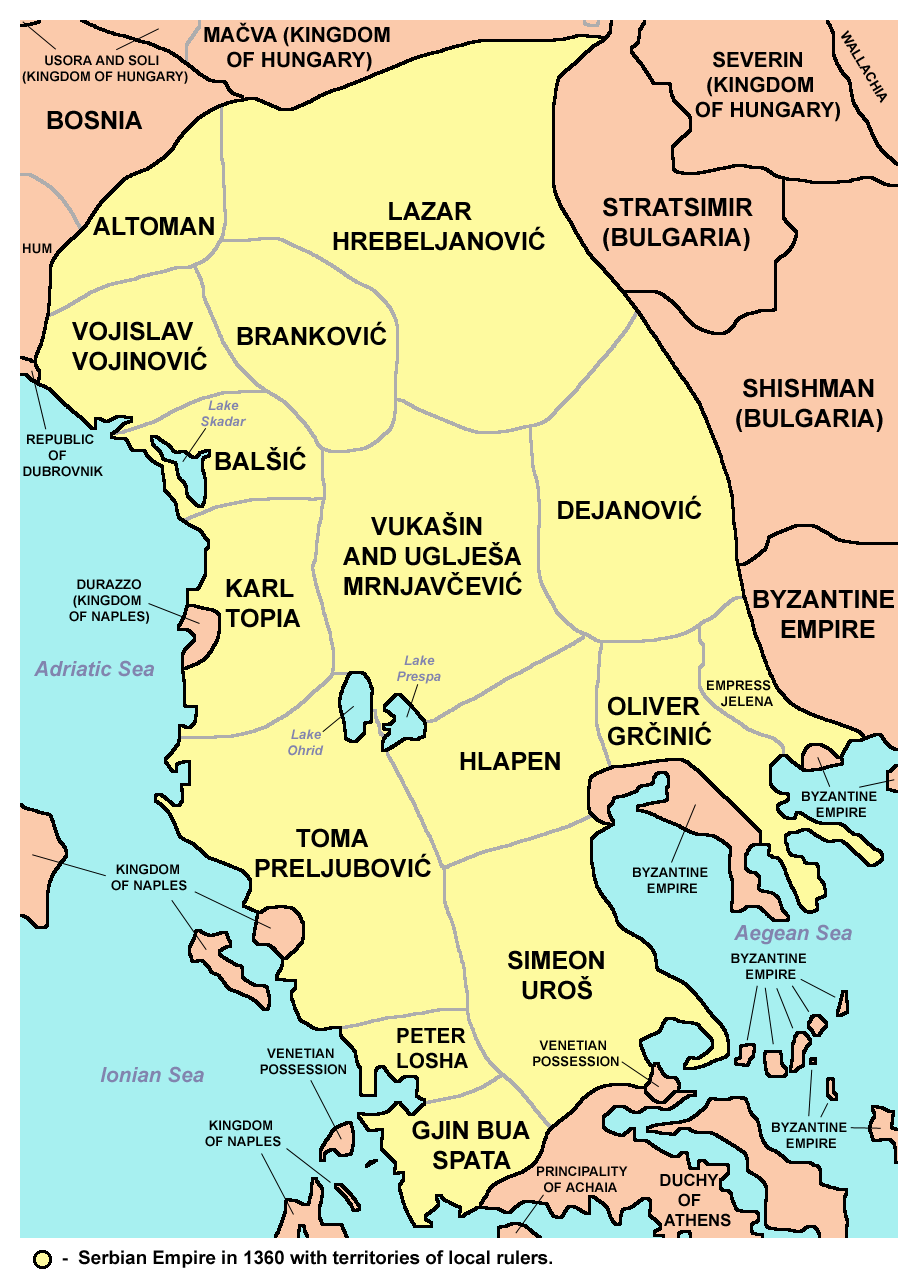
Serbian magnates and their provinces, c. 1360.

In 1365, a čelnik Radoslav was mentioned, referring either to Radoslav Hlapen or Radoslav Povika, the brother of logotet Đurađ.

== Fall of the Serbian Empire ==
In September 1371, the ruler of the lands around Edessa and Veria, Radoslav Hlapen, gained independence from the guardianship of brothers Vukašin and Uglješa and sought to expand his influence into Thessaly. Around the early 1370s, John Uroš, heir of the late Serbian Emperor Simeon Uroš, briefly ruled Thessaly but was soon deposed—either by the local Greek aristocracy under Despot Manuel II Palaiologos or by Radoslav Hlapen himself. John Uroš retired to the Meteora monasteries as a monk, taking the name Joasaph, but maintained some political influence in Epirus and Ioannina. Radoslav Hlapen’s intervention in Thessaly underestimated the power of Manuel II Palaiologos of Thessalonica. With Palaiologos’s support, Alexios Angelos Philanthropenos, a prominent local noble, took control of Thessaly in 1373, and his family ruled the region until the Ottoman conquest. To neutralize Hlapen’s heirs, Alexios married Hlapen’s daughter Maria. Manuel II Palaiologos continued to attack Hlapen’s territories, capturing the key city of Veria by 1375, effectively ending Hlapen’s principality. Radislav Hlapen died under uncertain circumstances around 1379.

== Last years ==
He retired as a monk in the Vodoča monastery where he also was buried. His votive ring was found at the site. He also founded a church in Kučevište, Skopje, a monastery in Ostrovo, and a monastery in Greece.

== Family ==
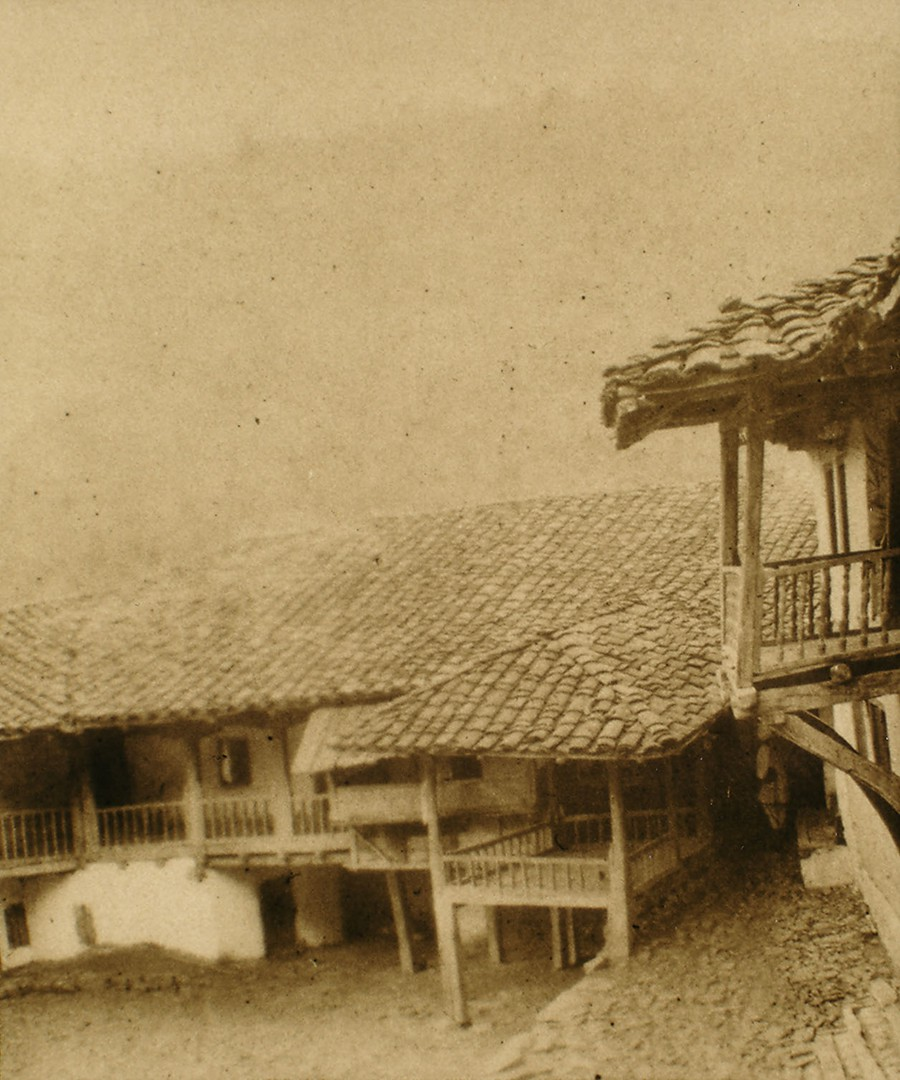
Monastery in Kučevište, Skopje, 1903.

He married Irina (Irene) Nemanjić, the widow of caesar Preljub. They had the following issue:

- Maria Angelina Radoslava, married Alexios Angelos Philanthropenos
- Jelena, married Marko Mrnjavčević
- Unnamed, married Nikola Bagaš
- Unnamed, married John Uroš
- Stefan

== Legacy ==
Mavro Orbini (1563–1614) called him "primo barone di Grecia" (1601).

== See also ==
- Nobility of the Serbian Empire

== Sources ==
Books

- Blagojević, Miloš (1997). Državna uprava u srpskim srednjovekovnim zemljama. Službeni list SRJ. ISBN 9788635503714.
- Ćorović, Vladimir (2001), Istorija srpskog naroda (in Serbian) (Internet ed.), Belgrade: Ars Libri
- Evans, Charles F. H. (1989). Studies in Genealogy and Family History in Tribute to Charles Evans on the Occasion of His Eightieth Birthday. Association for the Promotion of Scholarship in Genealogy.
- Fajfrić, Željko (2000) [1998], Sveta loza Stefana Nemanje (in Serbian), Belgrade: "Tehnologije, izdavastvo, agencija Janus", "Rastko".
- Божидар Ферјанчић (1974). Тесалија у XIII и XIV веку. Византолошки институт САНУ. "Овде се Прел>убова удо- ннца удала за Радослава Хлапена, господара Вера, који је сматрао да му после погибије деспота Нићифора II Анђела такође припада право на Тесалију. Зато се Радослав Хлапен 1359/60. године ..."
- Fine, John Van Antwerp (1994). The Late Medieval Balkans: A Critical Survey from the Late Twelfth Century to the Ottoman Conquest. University of Michigan Press. ISBN 978-0-472-08260-5.
- Nicol, Donald MacGillivray (1993), The Last Centuries of Byzantium, 1261–1453, Cambridge University Press, ISBN 978-0-521-43991-6
- Soulis, George Christos (1984), The Serbs and Byzantium during the reign of Tsar Stephen Dušan (1331–1355) and his successors, Dumbarton Oaks, ISBN 0-88402-137-8

Journals

- Mihajlovski, Robert (2005). "The Votive Ring of Radoslav Hlapen". Byzantinoslavica. 63. Academia: 187–192.
- Византолошки институт (1987). "Зборник радова Византолошког института". 26–28. Научно дело.
- Maksimović, Ljubomir M. (2004). "Berroia in Stefan Dušan's politics". Зборник радова Византолошког института. 41: 341–352.
