= Krepeni =

Village in Macedonia, Greece

Krepeni Κρεπενή
- Settlement
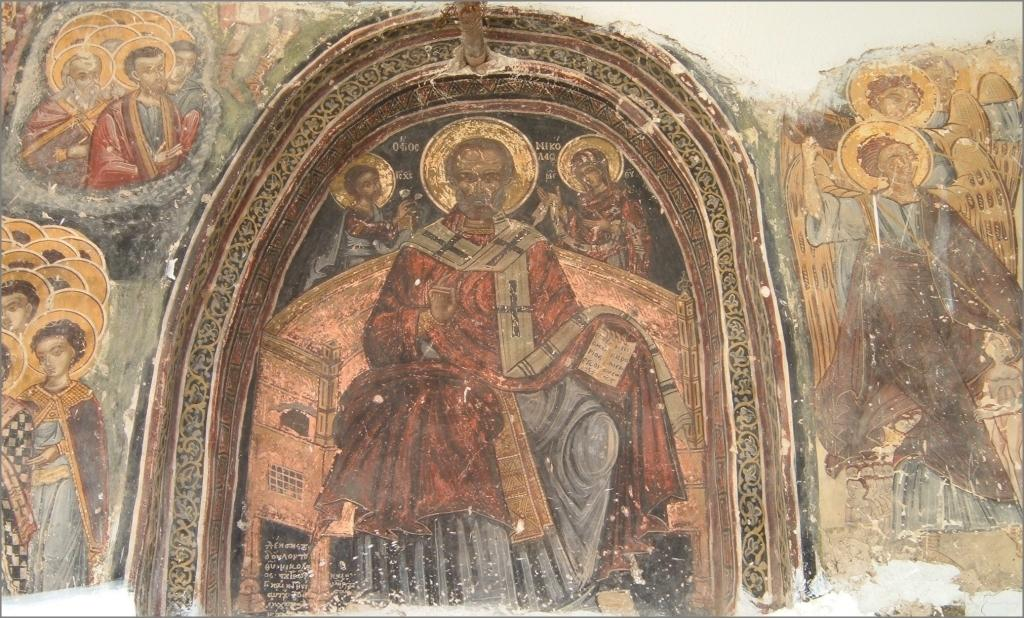
- Fresco in Saint Nicholas Church of Krepeni

- Location within Greece
- Coordinates: 40°29′15″N 21°19′32″E
- Country: Greece
- Geographic region: Macedonia
- Administrative region: Western Macedonia
- Regional unit: Kastoria
- Municipality: Kastoria
- Municipal unit: Makednoi
- Community: Mavrochori
- Elevation: 619 m (2,031 ft)

Population (2021)
  - Total: 109
- Time zone: UTC+2 (EET)
  - Summer (DST): UTC+3 (EEST)

Krepeni (Greek: Κρεπενή) is a village near the lake Orestiada in Macedonia, Greece, part of the Makednoi municipal unit of Kastoria municipality.

== History ==
=== Ancient Greece ===
Three necropolises of different dates have been identified in the area. The oldest is from the 8th to the 7th century BC (Early Iron Age) with dense burials in simple, usually rectangular pits, a few of which are box-shaped. Three hundred meters from the first were found a total of twenty tombs with unique findings of the archaic era (6th century BC) and the third of the early Hellenistic period of the fourth quarter of the 4th century or the beginning of the 3rd BC. century.

=== Ottoman Empire ===
The village of Krepeni had a historical relationship with both the nearby village of Mavrochori as well as with the Monastery of Panagia Mavriotissa, which was named Krepeniotissa in the early 17th century.

In the beginning of 19th century François Pouqueville described Crepeni as a hamlet of eight families.

In the British Baldwin & Craddock Map of Greece the village of Krepeni is not shown, although the nearby village of Mavrochori is visible.

In the end of the 18th century the patriarch of the Mavrovitis family moved his people from Krepeni to Mavrochori in order to avoid a plague epidemic.

It is believed that there were frequent movements of population between the villages of Krepeni and Mavrochori.

Stefan Verkovich, folklorist from Bosnia, noted in 1889 that there were 28 Bulgarian houses in Krepeni. He notes that the land is fertile and the local people are engaged in farming and vineyards.
