= George Hourmouziadis =

Greek archaeologist (1932–2013)

- Born: George Hourmouziadis; 26 November 1932
- Died: 16 October 2013 (aged 80)

George Hourmouziadis (Greek: Γιώργος Χουρμουζιάδης; 26 November 1932 – 16 October 2013) was a Greek archaeologist and professor emeritus of prehistoric archaeology at the Aristotle University of Thessaloniki. He led excavations in many prehistoric settlements in Thessaly and Macedonia (such as Dimini, Arkadikos Dramas etc.) and in 1992 he started the excavation of the Neolithic lakeside settlement of Dispilio in Kastoria, Northwestern Greece. A myriad of items were discovered, which included ceramics, structural elements, seeds, bones, figurines, personal ornaments, three flutes (considered the oldest in Europe) and the Dispilio Tablet. He died on 16 October 2013 in Thessaloniki.

The discovery of the wooden tablet was announced at a symposium in February 1994 at the University of Thessaloniki. The site's paleoenvironment, botany, fishing techniques, tools and ceramics were published informally in the June 2000 issue of Επτάκυκλος, a Greek archaeology magazine and in Hourmouziadis (2002).

In 2012, he was part of a multidisciplinary team of scientists who published a result on the use of Mass spectrometry (C13/C12 Carbon and O18/O16 oxygen) and cathodoluminescence microscopy for tracing back the physical origin of spondylus shell artifacts to reconstruct ancient trade and exchange routes.

== Published works ==
- 1973 - G. H. Hourmouziadis. Neolithic Figurines.
- 1979 - G. H. Hourmouziadis. Neolithic Dimini. Volos: Etaireia Thessalikwn Erevnwn, 1979.
  - Review, Journal of Hellenic Studies, 1981, vol. 101, p. 206-207
- 1982 - G. H. Hourmouziadis, P. Asimakopoulou-Atzaka, and K. A. Makris. Magnesia: the Story of a Civilization. Athens: Capon, Texas: Tornbooks, 1982. OCLC 59678966
- 1995 - G. H. Hourmouziadis. Analogies. Thessaloniki: Vanias, 1995.
- 1996 - G. H. Hourmouziadis. Dispilio, Kastoria a Prehistoric Lakeside Settlement. Thessaloniki: Codex, 1996. (In Greek.)
- 1999 - G. H. Hourmouziadis. Earthen Words. Skopelos: Nisides, 1999.
- 2002 - G. H. Hourmouziadis, ed. The prehistoric research in Greece and its perspectives: Theoretical and Methodological considerations. Thessaloniki: University Studio Press.
- 2002 - G. H. Hourmouziadis, ed. Dispilio, 7500 Years After. Thessaloniki: University Studio Press.
- 2006 - G. H. Hourmouziadis Ανασκαφής Εγκόλπιον. Athens, 2006.
