= Makednoi =

Makednoi Μακεδνοί
- Municipal unit
- Location within the regional unit

- Location within Greece
- Coordinates: 40°30′N 21°20′E
- Country: Greece
- Geographic region: Macedonia
- Administrative region: Western Macedonia
- Regional unit: Kastoria
- Municipality: Kastoria

Area
  - Municipal unit: 37.6 km^{2} (14.5 sq mi)

Population (2021)
  - Municipal unit: 2,967
  - Municipal unit density: 78.9/km^{2} (204/sq mi)
- Time zone: UTC+2 (EET)
  - Summer (DST): UTC+3 (EEST)
- Vehicle registration: KT

Makednoi (Greek: Μακεδνοί) is a municipal unit of Kastoria municipality in the Kastoria regional unit, Western Macedonia, Greece. Until the 2011 local government reform it was a separate municipality. The municipal unit has an area of 37.614 km^{2}, and a population of 2,967 (2021). The seat of the former municipality was in Mavrochori.

== Name ==
The name is derived from the Ancient Greek name Makednos (Μακεδνός), meaning "Macedonian". Whereas in Greek the municipal unit is referred to as Dimotiki Enotita Makednon (Δημοτική Ενότητα Μακεδνών), using the genitive plural form of the ancient name, Makednoi is the nominative plural form ("Makedones"). In English, the names Makednon, Makednoi, Makednos and Makednes are occasionally used.

== Communities ==
The communities of the municipal unit are:

- Dispilio
- Mavrochori (including the settlement Krepeni)
- Polykarpi
