= Polykarpi, Kastoria =

Polykarpi
- Community
- Location within Greece
- Coordinates: 40°31′17″N 21°19′17″E
- Country: Greece
- Geographic region: Macedonia
- Administrative region: Western Macedonia
- Regional unit: Kastoria
- Municipality: Kastoria
- Municipal unit: Makednoi

Population (2021)
  - Community: 644
- Time zone: UTC+2 (EET)
  - Summer (DST): UTC+3 (EEST)

Polykarpi (Greek: Πολυκάρπη, before 1926: Λίτσιστα – Litsista) is a village in Kastoria Regional Unit, Macedonia, Greece.

The 1920 Greek census recorded 585 people in the village, and 250 inhabitants (20 families) were Muslim in 1923. Following the Greek–Turkish population exchange, Greek refugee families in Litsista were from Asia Minor (26) and 5 from an unidentified location in 1926. The 1928 Greek census recorded 585 village inhabitants. In 1928, the refugee families numbered 31 (140 people).

In 1945, Greek Foreign Minister Ioannis Politis ordered the compilation of demographic data regarding the Prefecture of Kastoria. The village Polykarpi had a total of 740 inhabitants, and was populated by 370 Slavophones with a Bulgarian national consciousness. The inhabitants speak the Popole variant of the Kostur dialect.
