= Dispilio Lakeside Neolithic Settlement Archaeological Collection =

Museum in Greece

Coordinates: 40°29′7.90″N 21°17′31.46″E

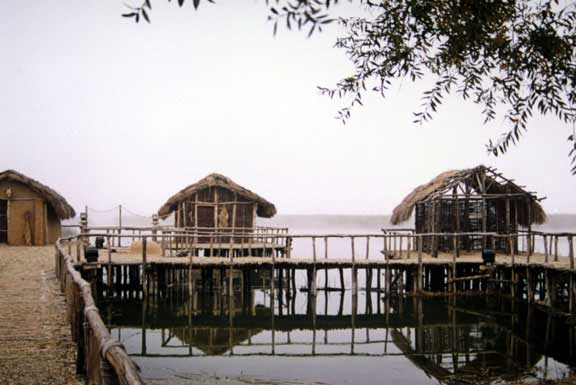
A close view

The Dispilio Lakeside Neolithic Settlement Archaeological Collection is a museum in Dispilio, Greece. It was the first Neolithic settlement by the side of a lake excavated in the country. Many important artifacts were found, the most notable being the Dispilio Tablet.

The village is 8 km from Kastoria. In 1932, Professor Keramopoullos of the Aristotle University of Thessaloniki located traces of a prehistoric lake settlement there. Thirty years later Professor Moutsopoulos conducted surface investigations and confirmed the existence of the settlement.

In 1992, Professor Nikos Hourmouziadis of the Aristotle University of Thessaloniki began systematic excavations, which are still going on. A settlement has been uncovered which dates to the mid-Neolithic period, i.e. the middle of the 6th millennium BCE. The strategic aim of the excavations is to study the settlement as a specific cultural system.

The finds include tools (stone, bone, and flint) and quantities of animal bones, a discovery which shows that the inhabitants engaged in agriculture, hunting, and fishing; materials with which the huts were built (wooden piles and floors, post-holes); large clay storage jars; baskets woven in the manner of that period; cooking utensils (many of them boat-shaped); and bone and stone jewellery. The most important find is a bone flute, one of the oldest musical instruments ever found in Europe. There is also a model in the exhibition area illustrating the form of the huts and how they were constructed.

A short distance from the exhibition area, lake, lakeside and land dwellings have been built by the lake, all exact reconstructions of the huts of the prehistoric settlement. Inside the huts are all the utensils which the people used for their everyday needs. An earthen cover in the middle of the settlement served to protect the fire, and there is a kind of pirogue moored at the lakeside, which the inhabitants would have used for fishing.

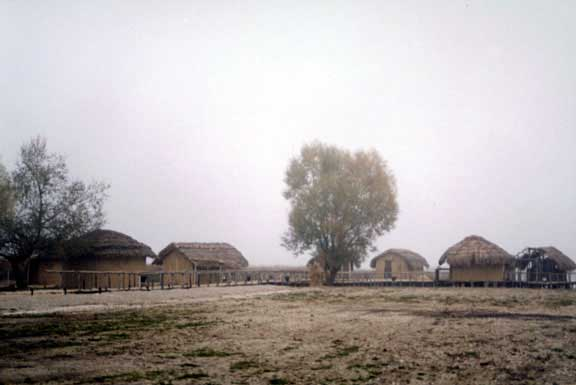
A view from a distance

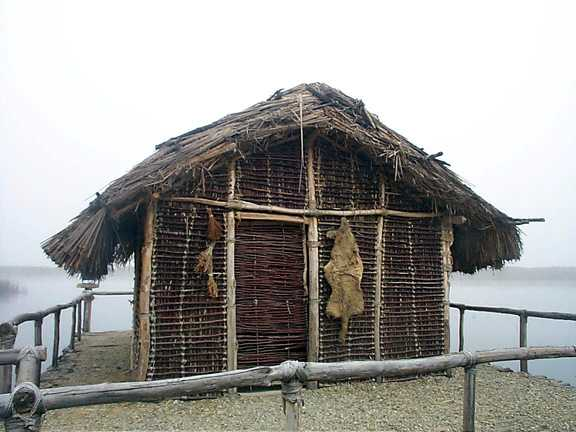
Lake dwelling

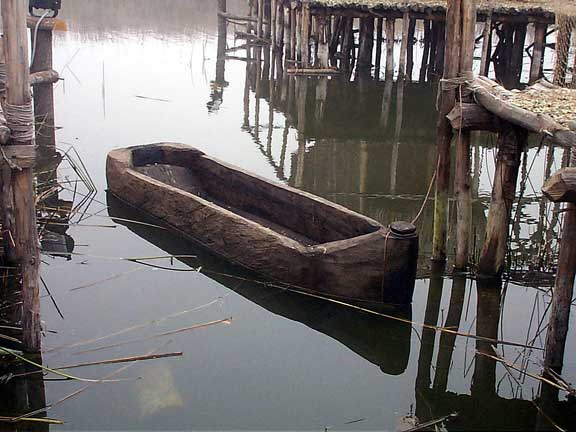
A kind of pirogue moored at the lakeside

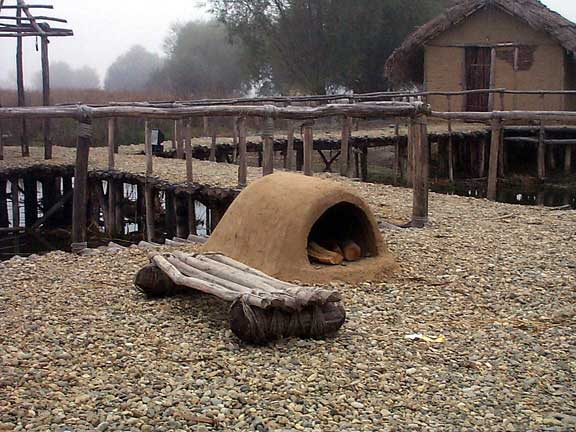
An earthen cover to protect the fire

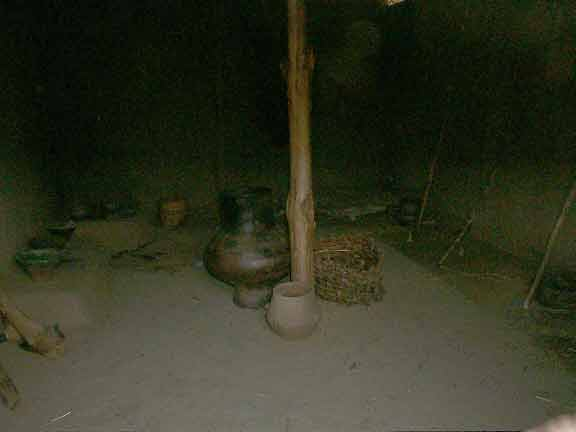
Interior of a hut
