= George Jackman =

English horticulturalist, Clematis grower

George Jackman II (1837–1887) was an English horticulturist and nurseryman, known for his work on early clematis hybrids. One of his first successful Clematis hybrids was C. 'Jackmanii'.

== Family business ==
Jackman's Nursery was founded by his paternal grandfather, William Jackman (1763–1840) in 1810, at St. Johns, Woking, Surrey. It occupied 50 acres (20 ha). The nursery was taken on by William's son George Jackman (1801–1869), whose eldest son was George Jackman II. By 1851, it had 90 acres (36 ha) and 41 staff. In the late 1880s the land was sold for development, and the business moved to a new site nearby, where it survives as Woking Garden Centre, in the "Garden Club" chain. It ceased being called Jackman's in 1996.

== Career ==
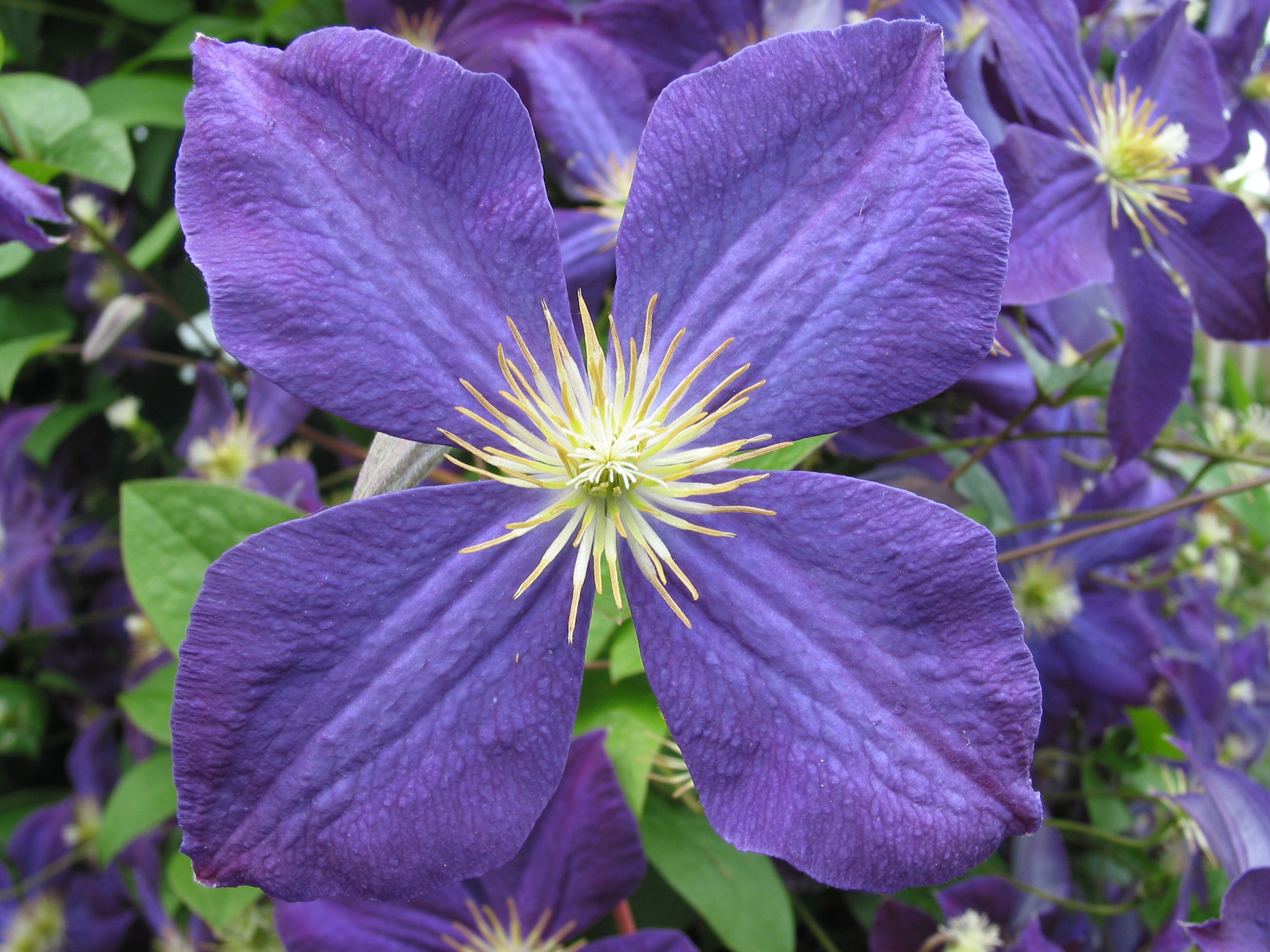
Clematis 'Jackmanii'

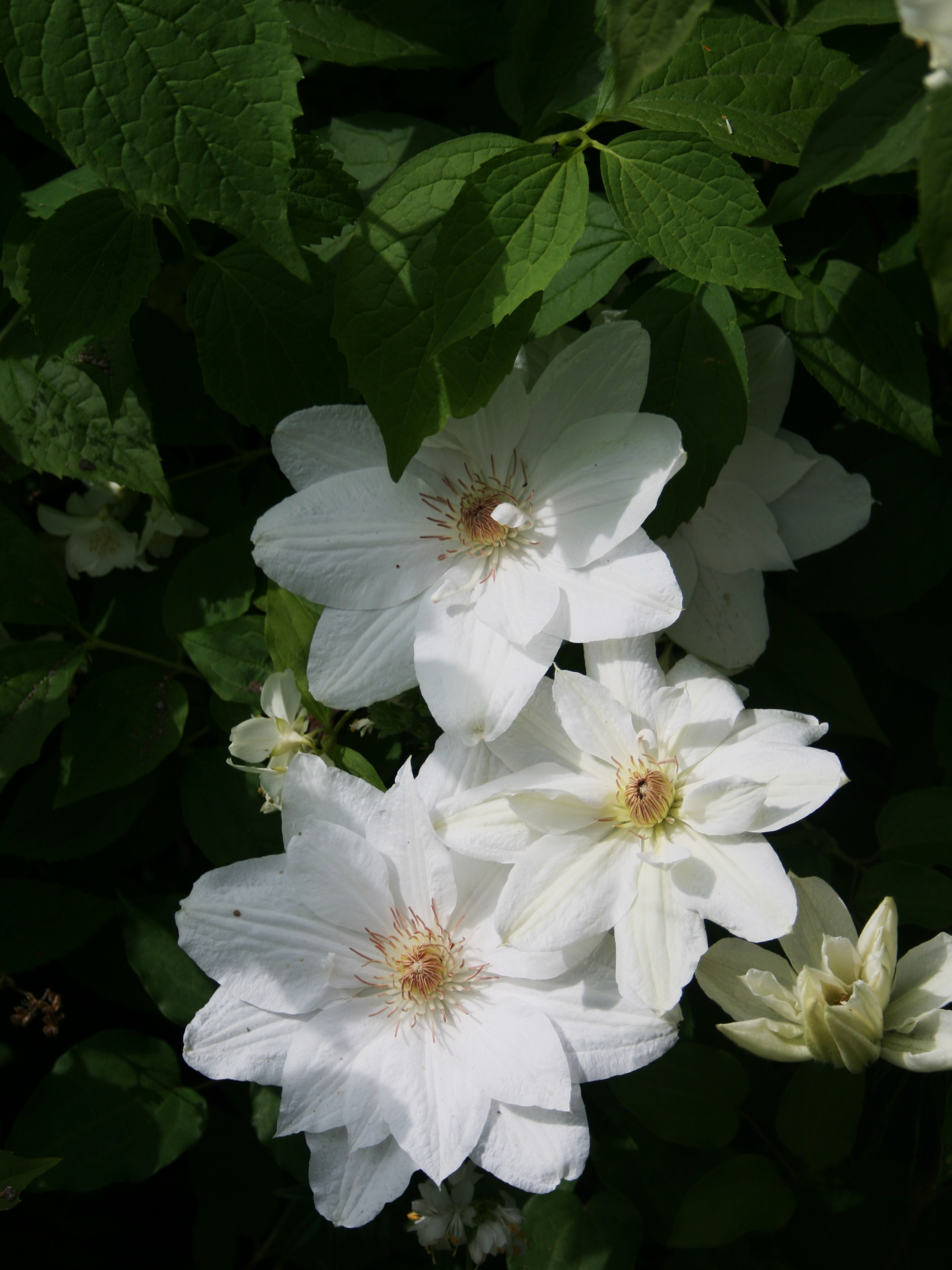
Clematis × lawsoniana 'Mrs George Jackman'

George Junior and his father started to hybridise Clematis in July 1858. Clematis 'Jackmanii' resulted from the first batch, and was awarded the Royal Horticultural Society's First Class Certificate in August 1863.

With Thomas Moore, he co-authored The Clematis as a Garden Flower (1872; revised 1877).

Jackman's papers are in Surrey History Centre.

=== Cultivars ===
Among the many Clematis introduced by Jackman are:

- 1858: C. 'Jackmanii'
- 1863: C. triternata 'Rubomarginata'
- 1871: C. 'Countess of Lovelace'
- 1873: C. 'Mrs George Jackman'
- 1875: C. 'Belle of Woking'
- 1875: C. 'Duchess of Edinburgh'
- 1878: C. 'Jackmanii Superba'
- 1880: C. 'Sir Trevor Lawrence'
- 1880: C. 'Duchess of Albany'

== Bibliography ==
- ——; Moore, Thomas (1872). The Clematis as a Garden Flower. John Murray.
