= Dispilio Tablet =

Wooden tablet bearing inscribed markings, discovered in Dispilio, Greece

The Dispilio tablet is a wooden artefact bearing linear marks, unearthed in 1993 during George Hourmouziadis's excavations of the Neolithic site of Dispilio in Greece. A single radiocarbon date from the artefact has yielded a radiocarbon age of 6270±38 radiocarbon years, which when calibrated corresponds to the calendar age range of 5324–5079 cal BC (at 95.4% probability). The lakeshore settlement occupied an artificial island near the modern village of Dispilio on Lake Kastoria in Kastoria, Western Macedonia, Greece.

== Discovery ==
The tablet is one of numerous items found during the excavations of the Neolithic layers at Dispilio. Most abundant objects were pottery fragments and wooden structural elements, followed by many seeds, bones, figurines, personal ornaments, and flutes.

The tablet's discovery was announced at a symposium in February 1994 at the University of Thessaloniki. The site's paleoenvironment, botany, fishing techniques, tools and ceramics were described informally in a magazine article in 2000 and by Hourmouziadis in 2002 and 2006.

The archaeological context of the tablet is not known, as it was found floating on the water that was filling the excavation trench. The tablet itself was partially damaged when it was exposed to the oxygen-rich environment outside of the mud and water in which it was immersed for a long period of time, and so it was placed under conservation. As of 2024, a full academic publication assessing the tablet apparently awaits the completion of conservation work.

Despite the lack of proper context, and the fact that no dedicated scientific paper has ever explained the tablet in detail, various archaeological and unofficial interpretations have surfaced, including the interpretation of the markings as some form of early writing. The markings on the tablet, and on a few other ceramic objects from the site, have been compared to those on other Neolithic clay finds from other sites in the southern Balkans, such as the Vinča symbols and the Tărtăria tablets, as well as the (much later) Linear A script. One of the main difficulties in such comparisons lies in the very wide range of possible dates for the different artefacts from different regions. The terms used for archaeological periods, such as "Late Neolithic", may mean different phenomena in different countries and within different schools of thought, and these periods often have assigned durations of several centuries or even a millennium.

== Incorrect image of the tablet ==
A large number of sources in popular and social media, and even some scholarly articles, show a wrong image of the tablet, specifically, the modern artistic recreation. This photograph portrays an object which is a modern recreation of how the tablet may have looked originally. It is an object hanging from the wall in one of the reconstructed house in the open-air museum nearby the archaeological site. The lines on the modern recreation bear little resemblance to the markings on the original artefact. The only publicly available photograph of the original artefact is contained in the article by Yorgos Facorellis et al. from 2014.

== See also ==
- Arkalochori Axe
- Gradeshnitsa tablets
- Phaistos Disc
- Vinča culture
- Vinča symbols
- Tărtăria tablets
- Neolithic Europe
- Trojan script
