= Byzantine Museum of Kastoria =

- Βυζαντινό Μουσείο Καστοριάς
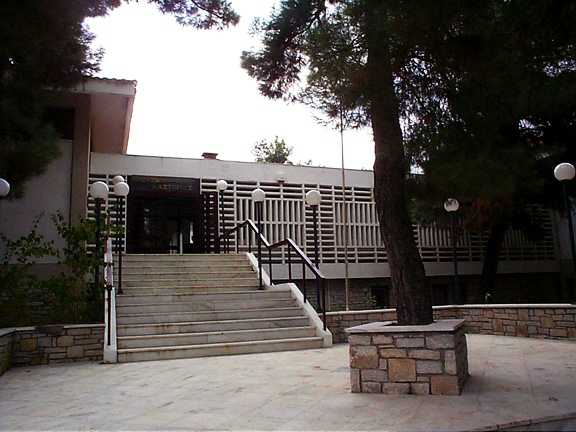
- Outside view
- Established: 1989
- Location: Kastoria, Macedonia, Greece
- Coordinates: 40.51927681483822°N 21.268515349731704°E
- Type: Archaeological and Byzantine museum
- Collection size: 700 icons
- Website: https://www.bmk.gr/en/

The Byzantine Museum of Kastoria is a museum in Kastoria, Macedonia, Greece, dedicated to religious art from the area's late Byzantine and post-Byzantine periods.

== Description ==
The museum stands at the highest point of the city, in Dexamenis Square (Platia Dexamenis), next to the Monuments Museum. It has been open since 1989. It has a collection of some 700 icons from the city's 75 Byzantine and post-Byzantine churches, and almost all of them have been restored and cleaned by the museum's conservators. Of this large collection, 35 icons are on permanent display. They date to the 12th to 17th centuries and are divided into six groups on the basis of their age and the atelier which produced them.

The most important icons are of: Elijah (12th century) in the severe Comnenian style; St. Nicholas (12th century) on a silver ground and surrounded by ten scenes from his life; Christ Pantocrator (14th century); Saints Cosmas and Damian (14th century); the Panagia Glykofiloussa and the Deposition from the Cross (late 14th century); the Man of Sorrows (15th century); an altar door (15th century) bearing a depiction of the Annunciation and busts of David and Solomon at the top; the Annunciation (16th century); the Christ Pantocrator (16th century) painted by a well-known icon-painter named Ioannis Permeniotis; the Panagia Hodegetria (16th century); and the Dormition of St Nicholas (16th century). In the semicircular part of the exhibition space are displayed three outstanding works by Kastorian ateliers: an icon of St. Paraskevi carrying her own head, and two altar doors with a representation of the Annunciation.

Until 1998, the museum ran an educational program for ten- to seventeen-year-olds titled "In the World of Byzantine Icons", and one of its aims for 2000 is to resume the program. It involved a guided tour of the museum and a detailed account of the stages of the making of an icon, accompanied by related activities and games.

== Gallery ==
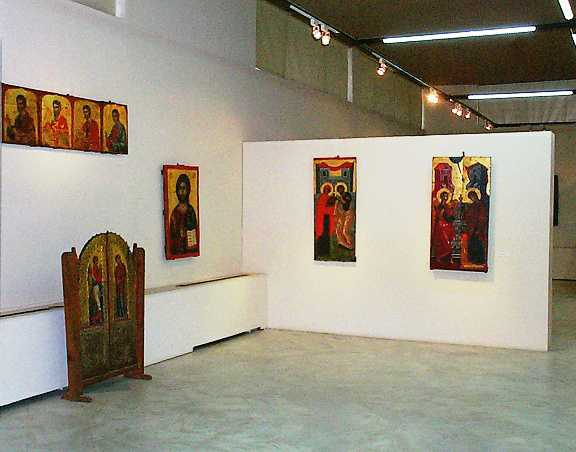
View inside

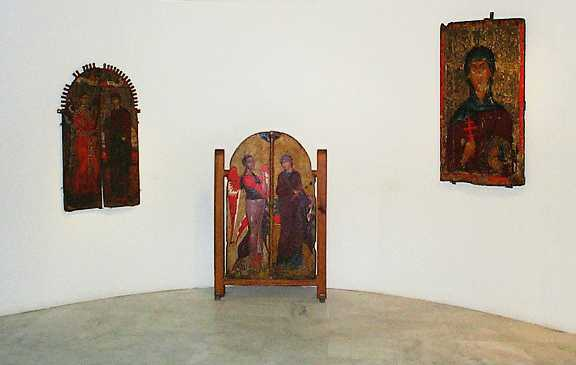
Icon of St Paraskevi carrying her own head, and two Vema doors with a representation of the Annunciation

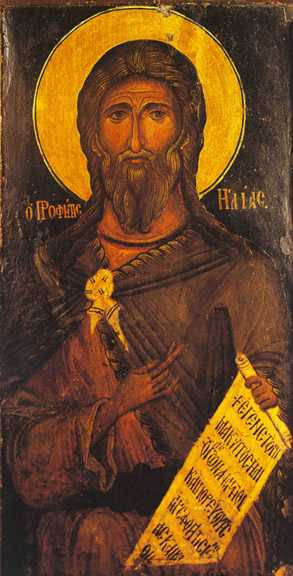
Prophet Elijah (12th century)

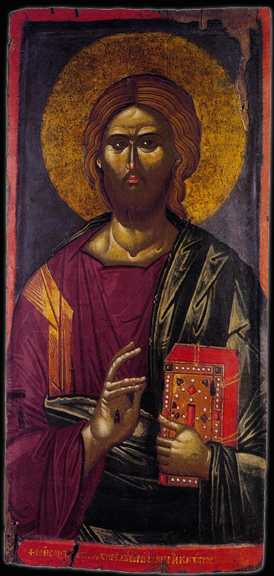
Christ Pantocrator (16th century)
