= Campanula versicolor =

Scientific classification
- Kingdom: Plantae
- Clade: Tracheophytes
- Clade: Angiosperms
- Clade: Eudicots
- Clade: Asterids
- Order: Asterales
- Family: Campanulaceae
- Genus: Campanula
- Species: C. versicolor

Binomial name
- Campanula versicolor Andrews

Synonyms
- Campanula mrkvickana Velen.; Campanula tenorei Moretti; Campanula thomasii Ten. ex A.DC.; Campanula versicolor f. mrkvickana (Velen.) Hayek; Campanula versicolor var. multiflora A.DC.; Campanula versicolor var. rosanii Nyman; Campanula versicolor var. thessala Boiss.; Campanula willdenowiana Schult.

Species of plant

Campanula versicolor, the various-colored bellflower is a species of plant in the family Campanulaceae. It occurs from southeastern Italy to the Balkans.
