= Vodoča =

- Village
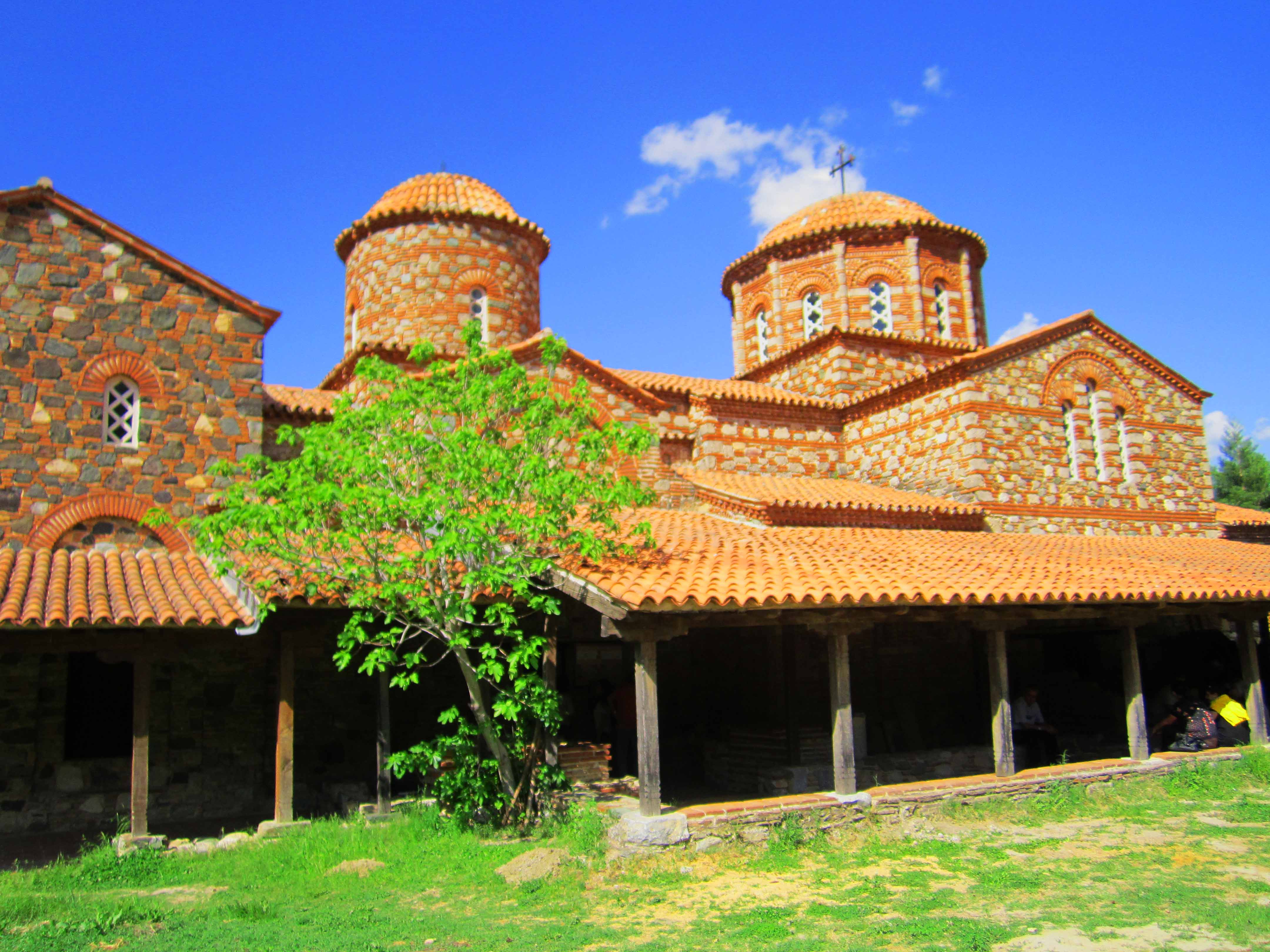
- Црква „Св. Леонтиј“ - Водоча.jpg

- Location within North Macedonia
- Coordinates: 41°27′N 22°35′E
- Country: North Macedonia
- Region: Southeastern
- Municipality: Strumica

Population (2002)
  - Total: 318
- Time zone: UTC+1 (CET)
  - Summer (DST): UTC+2 (CEST)

Vodoča (Macedonian: Водоча) is a village in Strumica Municipality, North Macedonia. It is located about 5 km (3.1 mi) northeast of Strumica and is home to the St. Leontius Monastery, which was completely reconstructed because of severe damage suffered during an earthquake that occurred in 1931.

== Demographics ==
According to the 2002 census, the village had a total of 318 inhabitants. Ethnic groups in the village include:

- Macedonians 316
- Serbs 2

As of 2021, the village of Vodocha has 227 inhabitants and the ethnic composition was the following:

- Macedonians – 216
- Albanians – 1
- Person without Data - 10
