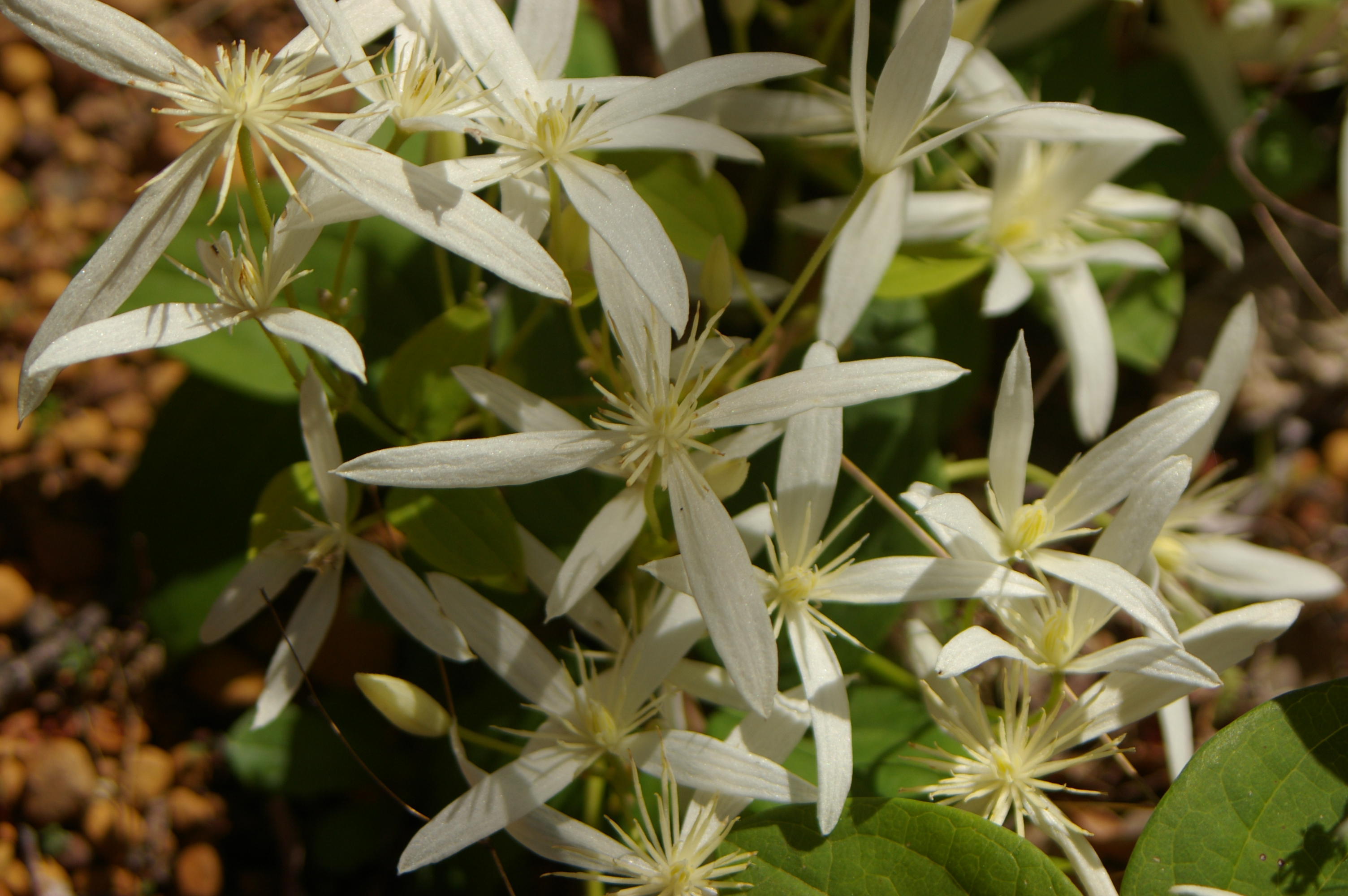

Scientific classification
- Kingdom: Plantae
- Clade: Tracheophytes
- Clade: Angiosperms
- Clade: Eudicots
- Order: Ranunculales
- Family: Ranunculaceae
- Genus: Clematis
- Species: C. pubescens

Binomial name
- Clematis pubescens Endl.

= Clematis pubescens =

Common clematis

Species of flowering plant in the buttercup family

Clematis pubescens, known locally as common clematis, is a climbing shrub of the family Ranunculaceae with white blooms, found in coastal regions of southern Western Australia.
