= Dispilio =

Village in Macedonia, Greece

Dispilio Δισπηλιό
- Community
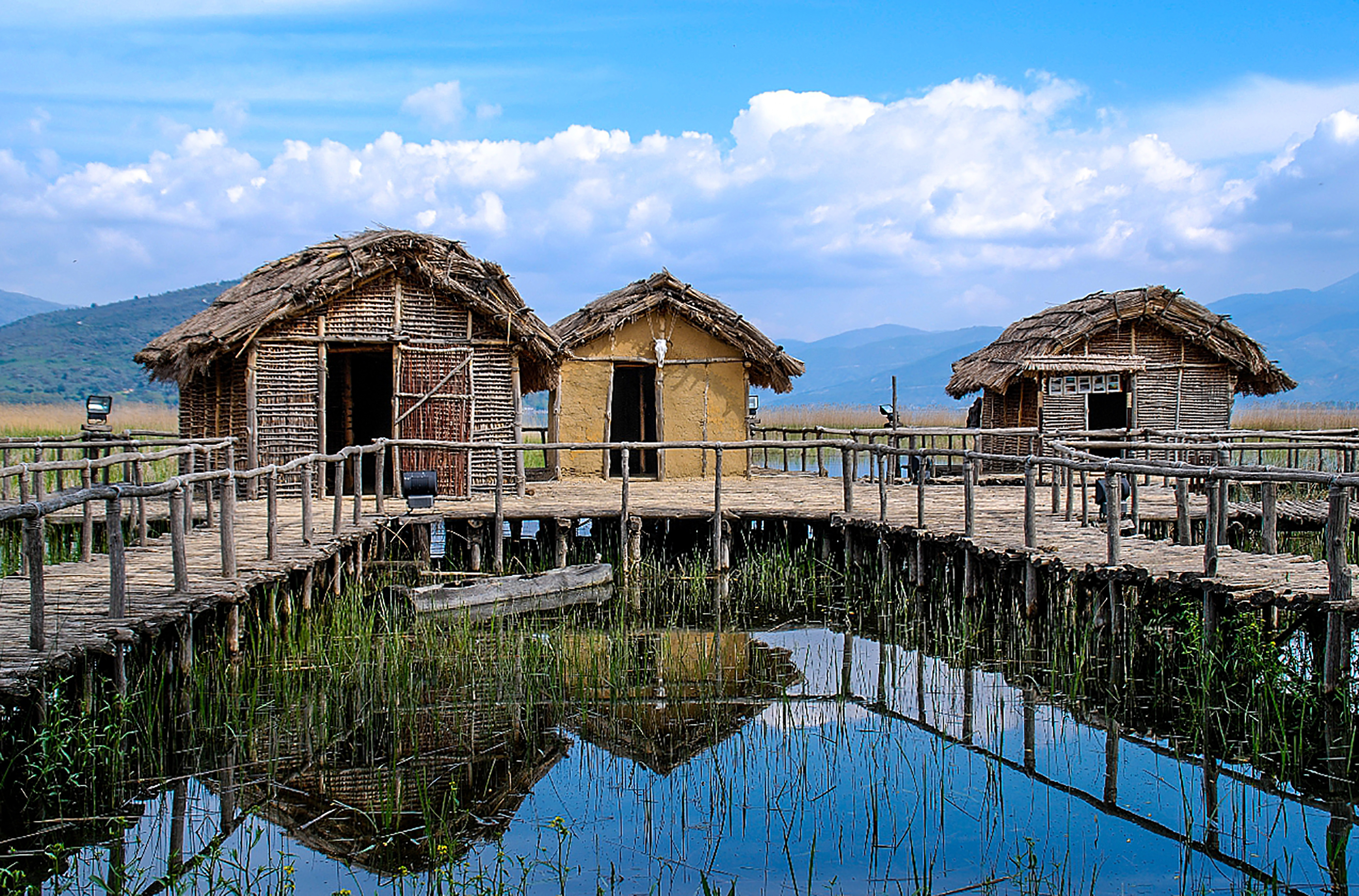
- Modern reconstruction of the hypothetical Neolithic settlement of Dispilio, on lake Orestiada

- Location within Greece
- Coordinates: 40°28′50″N 21°17′15″E
- Country: Greece
- Geographic region: Macedonia
- Administrative region: Western Macedonia
- Regional unit: Kastoria
- Municipality: Kastoria
- Municipal unit: Makednoi
- Elevation: 620 m (2,030 ft)

Population (2021)
  - Community: 944
- Time zone: UTC+2 (EET)
  - Summer (DST): UTC+3 (EEST)

Dispilio (Greek: Δισπηλιό, before 1926: Δουπιάκοι – Doupiakoi) is a village near Lake Orestiada, in the Kastoria regional unit of Western Macedonia, Greece. Near the village is an archaeological site containing remains of a Neolithic lakeshore settlement that occupied an artificial island.

== Archaeology ==
The remains of the lakeside settlement were discovered in 1932. The lake level was especially low in 1932 owing to a dry winter and some infrastructural works around the lake, revealing the remains of piles sticking out of the lake bottom. These have been interpreted as supports for stilt houses and walkways, similar to those found at other sites in Europe, such as the Somerset Levels.

A preliminary survey was made in 1935 by Antonios Keramopoulos. Excavations began in 1992, led by George Hourmouziadis (1932-2013), professor of prehistoric archaeology at the Aristotle University of Thessaloniki. The site's paleoenvironment, botany, fishing techniques, tools and ceramics were published informally in the June 2000 issue of Επτάκυκλος, a Greek archaeology magazine and by Hourmouziadis in 2002.

A reconstruction of the lake dwellers' settlement has been erected near the site to attract tourists from Greece and abroad, albeit the reconstruction is not based on architectural findings from Dispilio, but rather on other similar reconstructions from around Europe.

According to a series of radiocarbon dates, the site appears to have been occupied over a long period, from around 5600-5500 BC (Middle Neolithic), to around 3700-3500 BC (Final Neolithic or Early Bronze Age).

A new method, combining a Miyake event and dendrochronology, has been used to date the wooden structures at the site to a single calendar-year showing that the Late Neolithic construction phases took place between 5328 BC and 5140 BC.

After a potential hiatus, another occupation phase is detected later, around 2400-2100 BC during the Bronze Age. The identification of Mycenaean pottery also points to an occupation phase in the Late Bronze Age (second half of 2nd millennium BC).

A number of artifacts have been found during the excavations spanning more than 20 years, including pottery, wooden structural elements, seeds, bones, figurines, personal ornaments, flutes (some made on human bones), and many other objects. Like other waterlogged sites, Dispilio is particularly important for its excellent preservation of organic materials, such as wood, seeds, plant fibre and similar. Public interest was especially attracted after the discovery of "Dispilio Tablet", a wooden object with linear markings on its surface, conjectured by some to be an early writing system.

== See also ==
- Orestis (region)
- Upper Macedonia
