= Monastery of Panagia Mavriotissa =

Monastery in Kastoria, Greece

Coordinates: 40.5098°N 21.2903°E

The Monastery of Panagia Mavriotissa (Greek: Παναγία Μαυριώτισσα) is a monastery that is built on the spot where troops of Byzantine military commander George Palaiologos encircled the attacking Normans in 1083. It is believed that the emperor Alexios I Komnenos (r. 1081-1118) built the monastery there to commemorate the event.

Surrounding the region of the lake of Kastoria there are 72 churches and chapels, Mavriotissa being one of the earliest of them.

== History ==
The monastery was initially named Mesonesiotissa ("in the middle of the island") and in the beginning of the 17th century it renamed itself to Krepenitissa ("of Krepeni") after the name of the nearby village Krepeni. Sometime from the middle to late 17th century it changed its name to Mavriotissa ("of Mavrovo") after the village Mavrochori near Kastoria.

The monastery was a significant landowner in the village of Krepeni.
