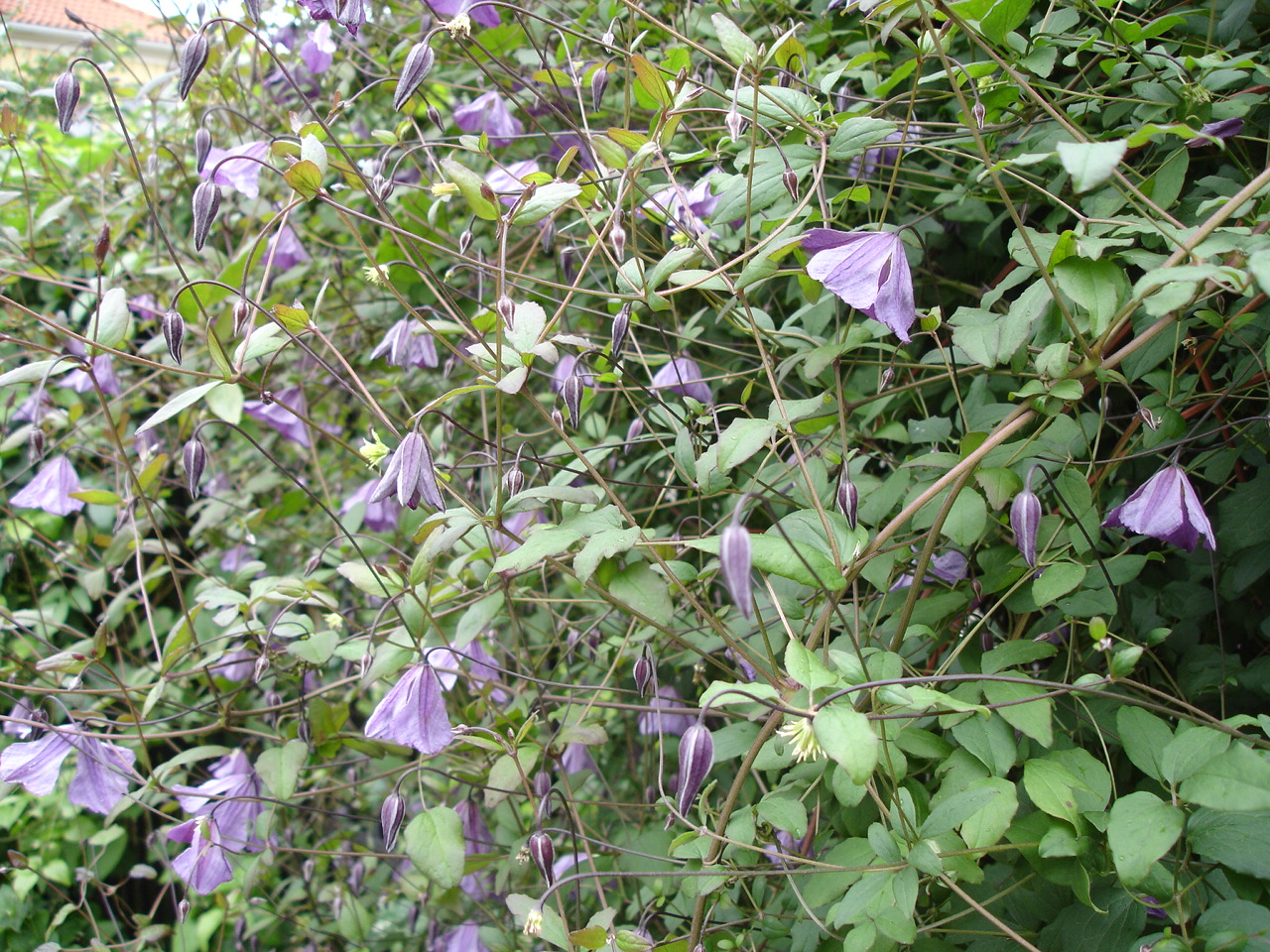

Scientific classification
- Kingdom: Plantae
- Clade: Tracheophytes
- Clade: Angiosperms
- Clade: Eudicots
- Order: Ranunculales
- Family: Ranunculaceae
- Genus: Clematis
- Species: C. viticella

Binomial name
- Clematis viticella L.

= Clematis viticella =

Species of flowering plant in the buttercup family

Clematis viticella, the Italian leather flower, purple clematis, or virgin's bower, is a species of flowering plant in the buttercup family Ranunculaceae, native to Southern Europe and Western Asia, from the Italic Peninsula to Iran. This deciduous climber was the first clematis imported into English gardens, where it was already being grown in 1569 by Hugh Morgan, apothecary to Elizabeth I. By 1597, when it was already being called "virgin's bower", there were two varieties in English gardens, a blue (actually a purple-blue) and a red.

All varieties of Clematis viticella are hardy in winter, tolerant of both sun and shade, and resistant to clematis wilt.
