= Wildlife of Benin =

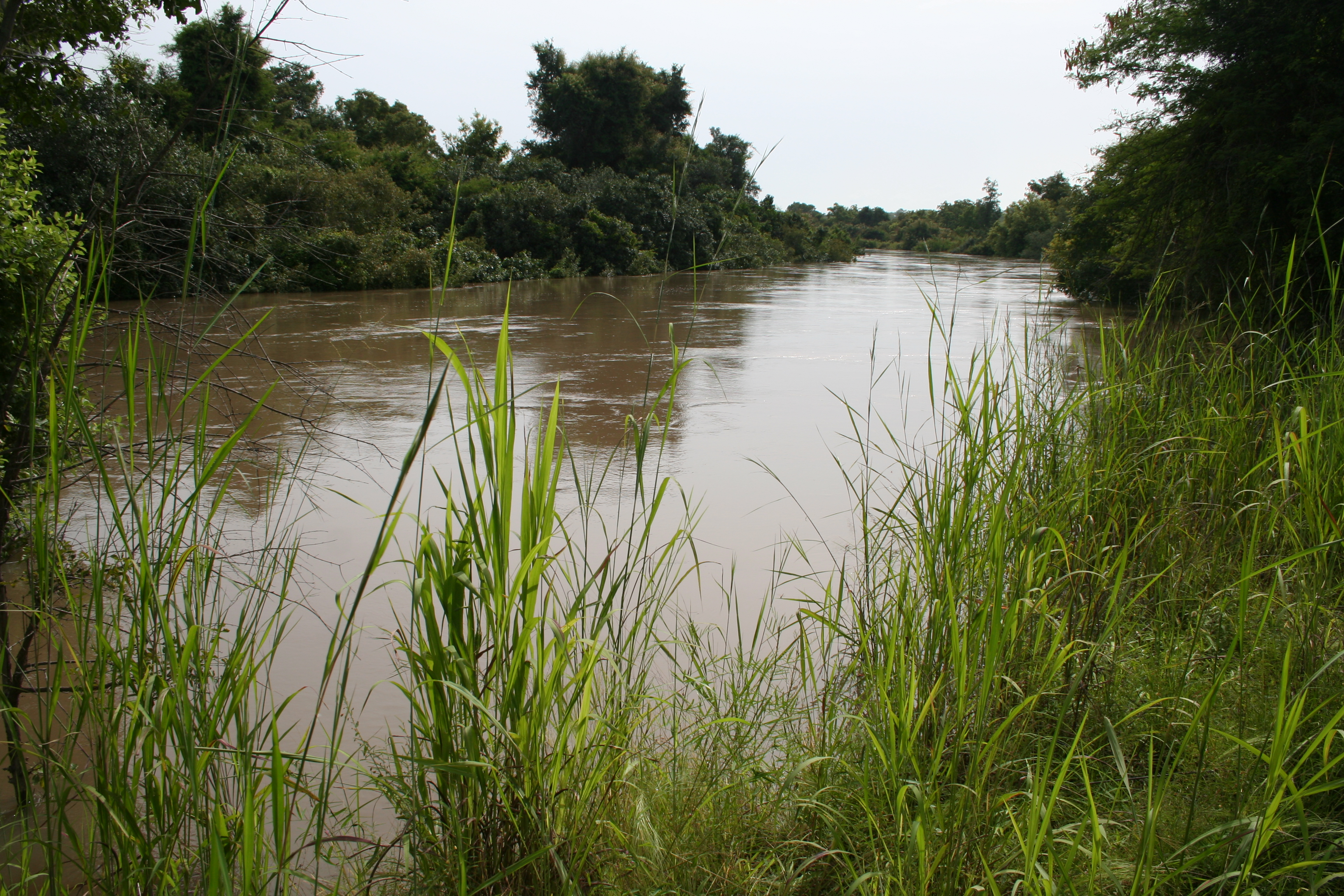
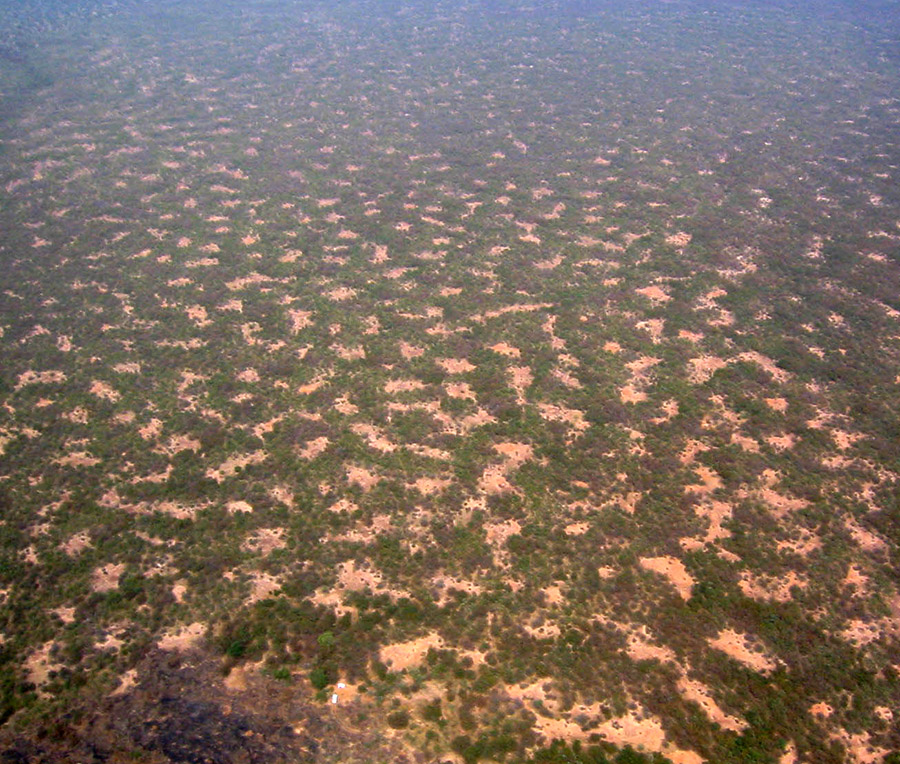
Left: The Mekrou River in W National Park. Right: Aerial oblique view of a gapped bush plateau in W National Park. The mean distance between two consecutive gaps is 50 meters.

Location of Benin

Benin has varied resources of wildlife comprising flora and fauna, which are primarily protected in its two contiguous protected areas of the Pendjari National Park and W National Park. The former is known for many species of avifauna and the latter park is rich in mammals and predators. In addition, many other forest reserves are noted in the country but are not easily accessible, well protected or adequately surveyed for its wildlife resources. The protected area of Benin which is defined as a National Protected Area System is in northern Benin, mostly with a woody savanna ecosystem. It covers 10.3% of the nation and is part of the three-nation W-Arly-Pendjari Complex (WAP) (of which 43%, 36% and 21% is in Benin, Burkina Faso and Niger respectively).

Forests of particular note are the riparian forests which form a dominant ecosystem, accounting for one-third of the estimated flora of 3,000 species in Benin. These forests are found along river banks consisting of semi-deciduous, dry, and open forest and woodland savanna. However, these systems have been subject to severe misuse by way of deforestation, which necessitated the enforcement of a law restricting cutting of these forests.

In south Benin, where malaria is a common disease as in the rest of Africa, medicinal plants are used for treatment as a form of traditional or alternative medicine.

== National parks ==
=== W National Park ===
W National Park, IUCN Management Category II, a transboundary park among Niger, Benin and Burkina Faso, as a part of the Niger River, encompasses an area of 563,280 hectares (1,391,900 acres) in Benin. The "W" is after the W-shaped bends in the Niger River that borders the park and which is fed by the Tapoa River in the north, and the Mékrou River in the south. Its elevation is between 170 and 338 metres (558 and 1,109 ft). In addition, the buffer zones are the hunting zones of Mékrou, 102,640 hectares (253,600 acres), Djona, 115,200 hectares (285,000 acres) and Kompa, 15,000 hectares (37,000 acres), apart from transition areas in a 5 kilometres (3.1 mi) zone. This area in the West African savanna belt covers terrestrial, semi-aquatic and aquatic ecosystems. Primarily of semi-arid to semi-humid Sudanese wooded savanna, 500 plant species have been identified. Sudanian savanna fauna consists of 70 diurnal mammals and more than 112 species of fish including the monkfish and sawback angelshark. The park has about 200,000 people living within it and on its periphery, which creates conflicts between park managers, herders and farmers.

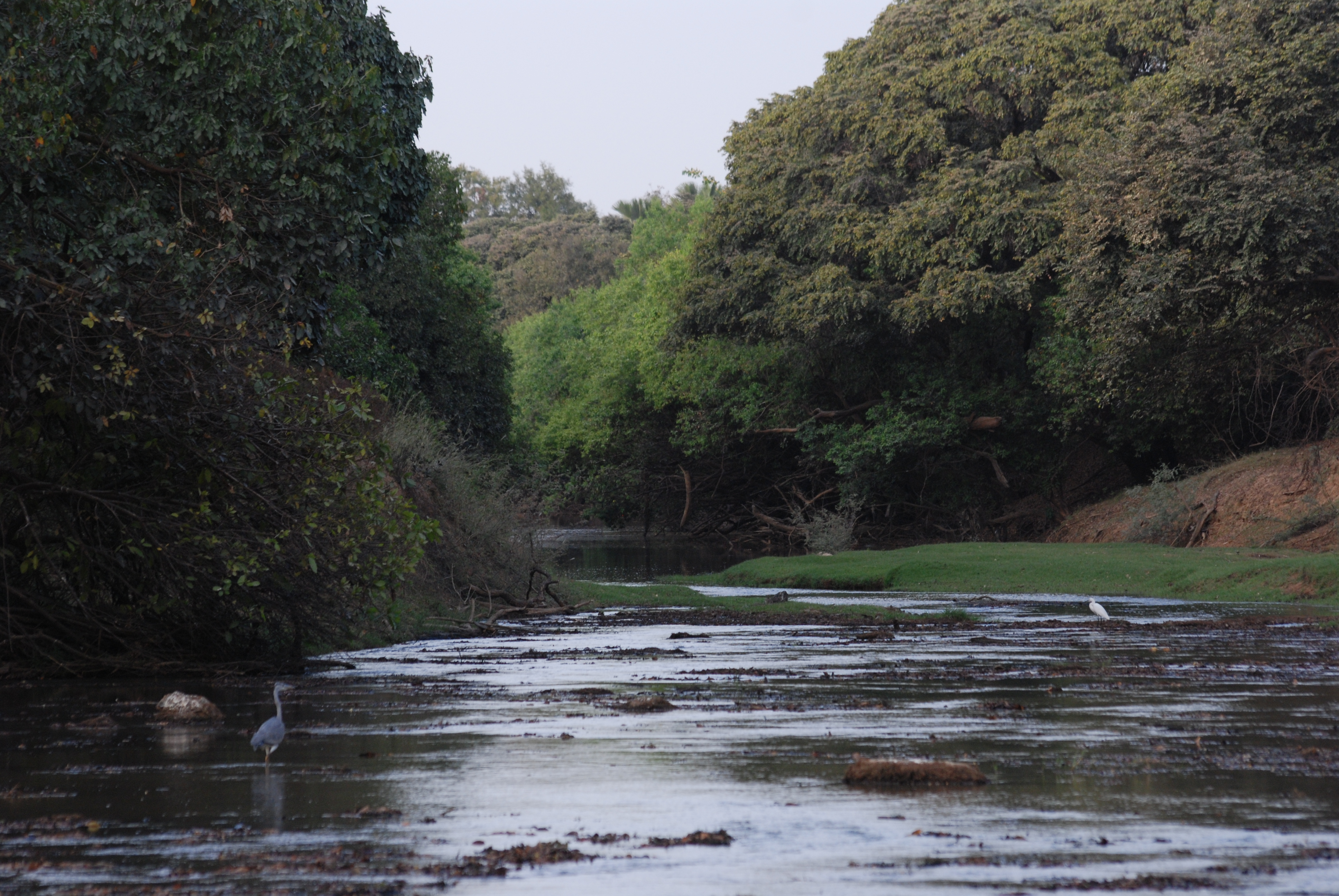
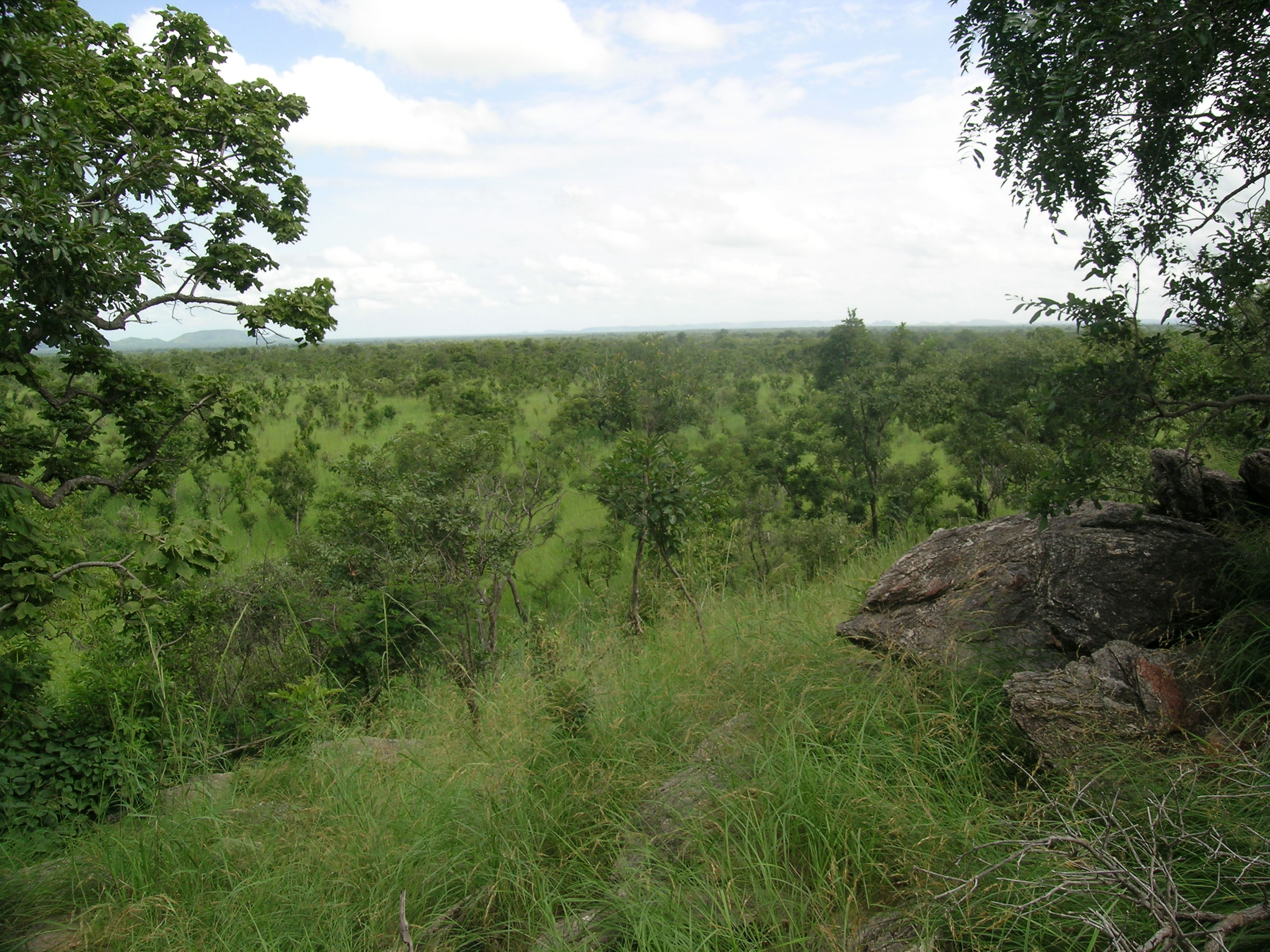
Left: Pendjari River (Oti River) in the north of Pendjari National Park during the dry season, Benin. Right: Flora in Pendjari National Park

=== Pendjari National Park ===
The Pendjari National Park covers 275,500 hectares (681,000 acres) of the far north-west of Benin. Its buffer zones are the Pendjari (348,000 ha) that incorporates the hunting zones of Pendjari-Porga (76,000 ha), Batia (75,500 ha) and Konkombri (25,900 ha). Initially known as a forest reserve, it was declared a national park on May 6, 1961, after the independence of Benin. In June 1986, it was classified as a MAB Biosphere Reserve (including the adjoining hunting zones of Pendjari and Atacora). The Pendjari River Valley was recognized as a wetland of international importance and designated as a Ramsar site in February 2007. The park is part of the W-Arli-Pendjari complex (WAP), a vast protected area in Benin, Burkina Faso and Niger. The hills and cliffs of the Atakora range make the northwest one of the most scenic areas of Benin. They provide a wonderful backdrop to the Pendjari National Park, which, in its isolation, remains one of the most interesting in West Africa.

== Riparian forests ==
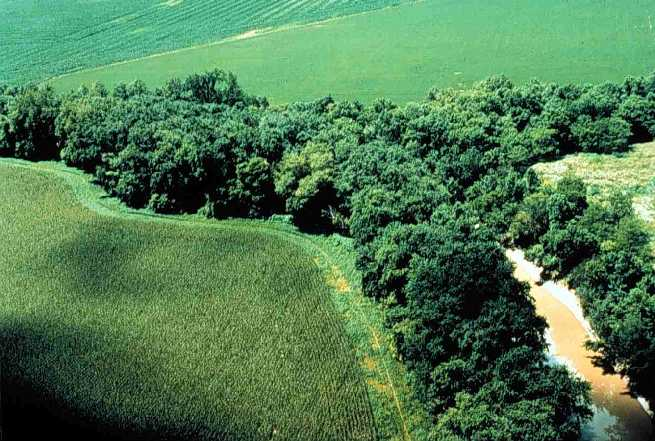
Riparian forest along a river bank/lake shore

Riparian forests in Benin are important conservation sites that need more care than is currently available. These forests, which are flood-dependent and the flora that is dependent on this source of water, are seen in many parts of Benin. In addition, forest and savanna species are also part of this ecosystem as they have a combination of plants from various forest and savanna types. Hence, riparian forests are more diverse than those of the single one-ecosystem-based vegetation. They also provide food for many animals and other forest species for survival.

The riparian forests ecosystem is in a limited area and spread in a linear shape. The forests account for at least one-third of the estimated 3,000 species of flora of Benin, with several valuable, rare or even endemic species. These forests are woodlands of semi-deciduous, dry, and open forest, and woodland savanna that occur along riverbanks or streams. The physiognomy of this type of forest is highly variable with trees of average height of 14–18 metres (46–59 ft) and some places as high as 20–25 metres (66–82 ft) with dense understorey (undergrowth). Adjacent ecosystems also affect the vegetation in these forests.

However, this ecosystem of hydrophilic and edaphic freshwater forest is of general structural complexity and extent. It was in a state of extinction due to "shifting cultivation, grazing, selective cutting of valuable or rare tree species, roads and dams construction, and over-exploitation of non-timber forest products" to meet the basic needs of rural communities. These practices resulted in the degradation of the ecosystem of rare plants and animals. It reached a critical stage where indigenous multilayered plant communities became extinct in several areas with the resultant creation of open fields, shrubs or savannas of least value. Thus, the degradation of the ecologically rich system necessitated intervention at the Government level through enabling legislation to stop further damage to the ecosystem. The government of the Republic of Benin enacted a forest law (no. 93-009) in July 1993, under which the uniqueness of riparian forests as refuge ecosystem for plants and wildlife of many kinds was duly recognized. The enacted law stated that "clearance of wood and shrubs is not allowed within 25 metres (82 ft) at both sides of any waterway (article 28). Moreover, in the management plans of most forest reserves in Benin, gallery forests are to be left uncut..." Rare species (e.g. mahogany family species of the Khaya genus; the Moraceae species, Milicia excelsa) outside the gallery forests will not be cut either." Despite such legislation, enforcement is not effective. It is reported that uncontrolled illegal utilisation of forest resources continue, particularly in non-protected areas.

== Fauna ==
=== Mammals ===
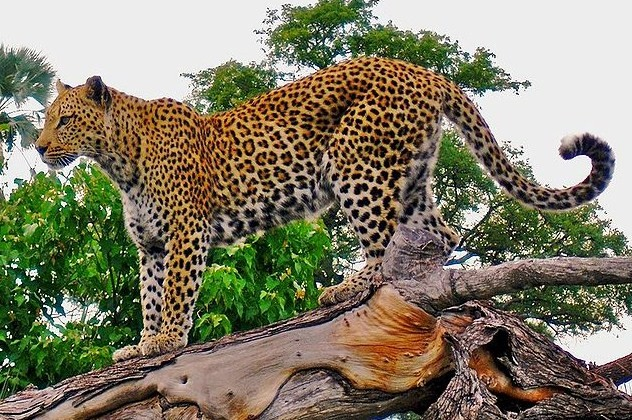
Leopard on a tree stump

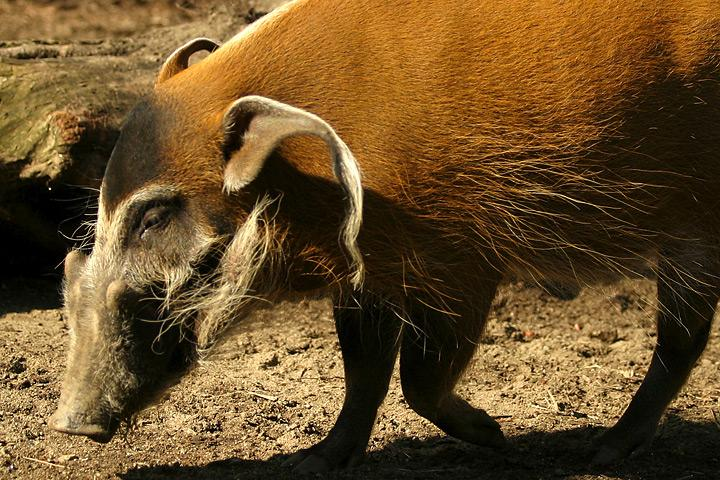
Red river hog

Predators include lion (Panthera leo), leopard (Panthera pardus), cheetah (Acinonyx jubatus), caracal (Caracal caracal), African wild cat (Felis lybica), African hunting dog (Lycaon pictus), side-striped jackal (Canis adustus), black-backed jackal (Canis mesomelas), spotted hyena (Crocuta crocuta). Nocturnal predators include African civet (civettictis civetta), small-spotted genet (Genetta genetta), Cape genet (Genetta tigrina), spotted-necked otter (Lutra maculicollis), honey badger (Mellivora capensis), marsh mongoose (Atilax paludinosus), Egyptian mongoose (Herpestes ichneumon), cusimanse (Crossarchus obscurus), white-tailed mongoose (Ichneumia albicauda), slender or pygmy mongoose (Galerella sanguinea), Gambian mongoose (mungos gambianus).

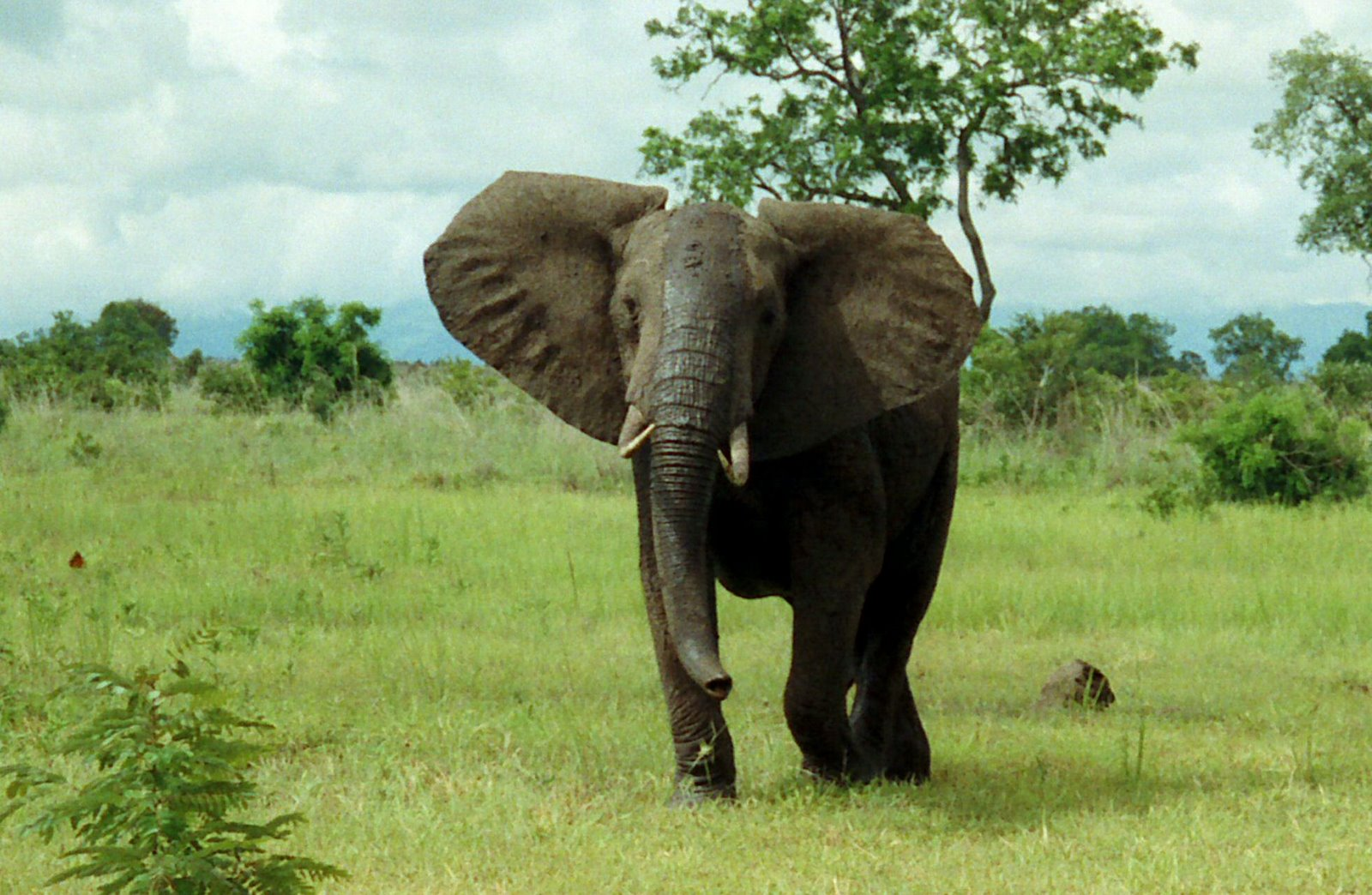
African bush elephant

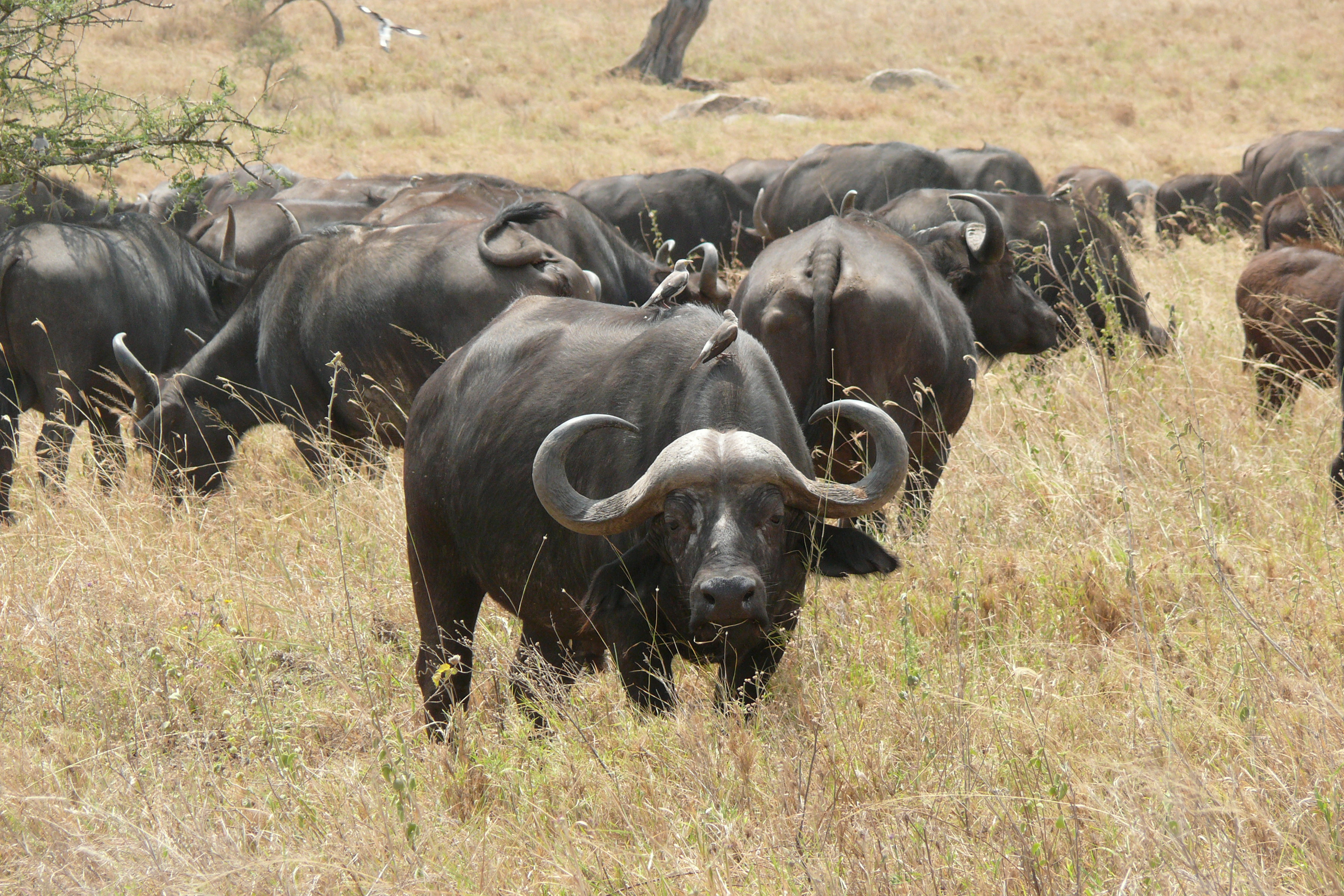
African buffalo herd

The parks and other areas are home to African bush elephant, rhinoceros and African buffalo and antelopes. Seventeen species have been identified, such as sitatunga (Tragelaphus spekii), bongo (Tragelaphus eurycerus) and korrigum (Damaliscus korrigum korrigum). Other species of various status are grey duiker (Sylvicapra grimmia), bushbuck, Maxwell's duiker (Philantomba maxwellii), red-flanked duiker (Cephalophus rufilatus), black duiker (Cephalophus niger), yellow-backed duiker (Cephalophus silvicultor), grey duiker (Sylvicapra grimmia)

- bohor reedbuck (Redunca redunca), waterbuck (Kobus ellipsiprymnus), Buffon's kob (Kobus kob), roan antelope (Hippotragus equinus), western hartebeest (Alcelaphus buselaphus major), red-fronted gazelle (Eudorcas rufifrons) and oribi (Ourebia ourebi).

Primates reported include olive baboon (Papio anubis), green monkey (Cercopithecus sabaeus) and common patas monkey (Erythrocebus patas).

=== Reptiles ===
Reptiles present include Nile crocodile (Crocodylus niloticus), dwarf crocodile (Osteolaemus tetraspis) and chameleons in 100 colour variations. Tortoises include leopard tortoise (Stigmochelys pardalis), several species of terrapin and turtles – out of eight species of marine turtles four occur in Benin coast, namely, the green sea turtle (Chelonia mydas), olive ridley sea turtle (Lepidochelys olivacea) and leatherback sea turtle (Dermochelys coriacea). The indigenous hawksbill sea turtle (Eretmochelys imbricata) is the source of traditional tortoiseshell. Lizards are of two types which are both harmless; house geckos and skinks. Both are predatory species.

=== Birds ===
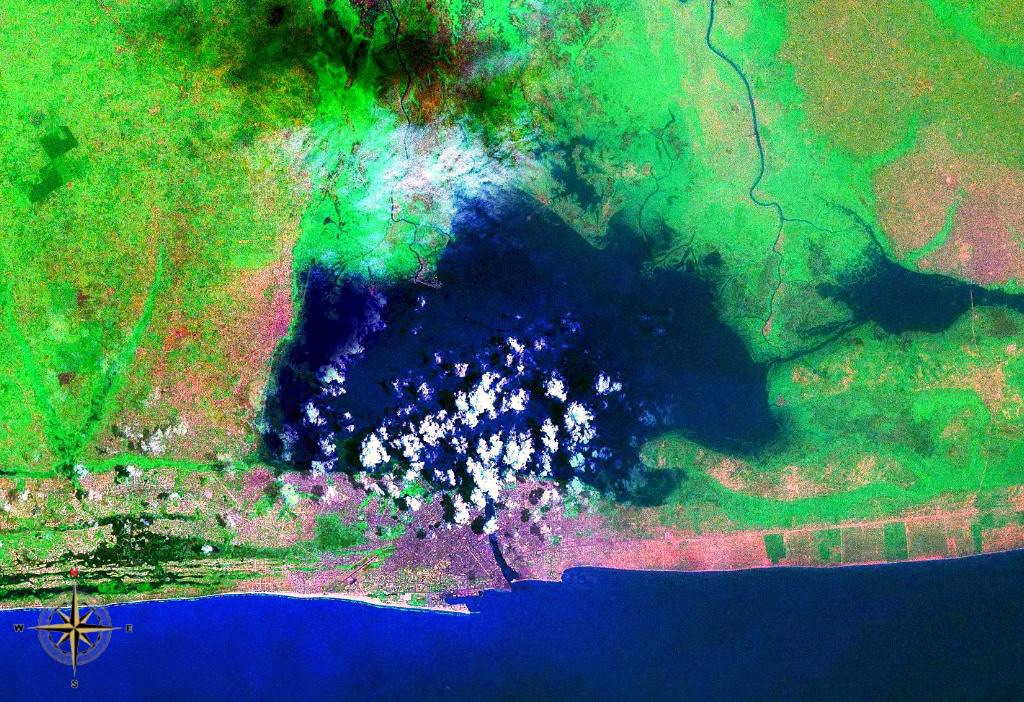
Lake Nokoue

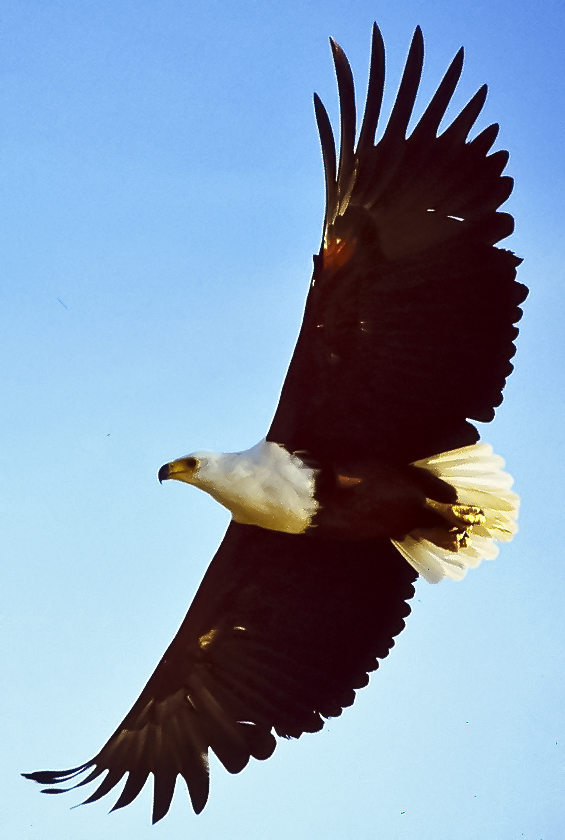
African fish eagle

Birds are a special feature in all types of habitats ranging from rainforest to deserts in Benin, which have two main climatic zones, namely the thick tropical vegetation in the south and the dry savannas and light woodlands in the north. The birding sites for coastal waders are the coastal lagoons of Les Bouches du Roi and the backwaters of Ouidha beach. Water and forest birds occur in Lake Nokoué and Lake Ahémé. Feathered birds are found in granite rock hills near Dassa-Zoume. The national parks are full of savanna specific birds.

The weaver species reported are: twelve species of weavers of family Ploceidae are found in Benin, out of the overall 111 of the genus Ploceus (true weavers) identified; they are larger than a sparrow, males are more colourful than female species.

Other reported species are Holub's golden-weaver, southern masked weaver (Ploceus velatus), Vieillot's black weaver (Ploceus nigerrimus), black-billed weaver (Ploceus melanogaster), grosbeak weaver (Amblyospiza albifrons), sparrow, buffalo weavers, dideric cuckoo (Chrysococcyx caprius), white-breasted cuckooshrike (Coracina pectoralis) and African fish eagle (Haliaeetus vocifer).

=== Insects ===
Insect species found in Benin include the tsetse fly and many vectors of epidemic diseases.

== Flora ==
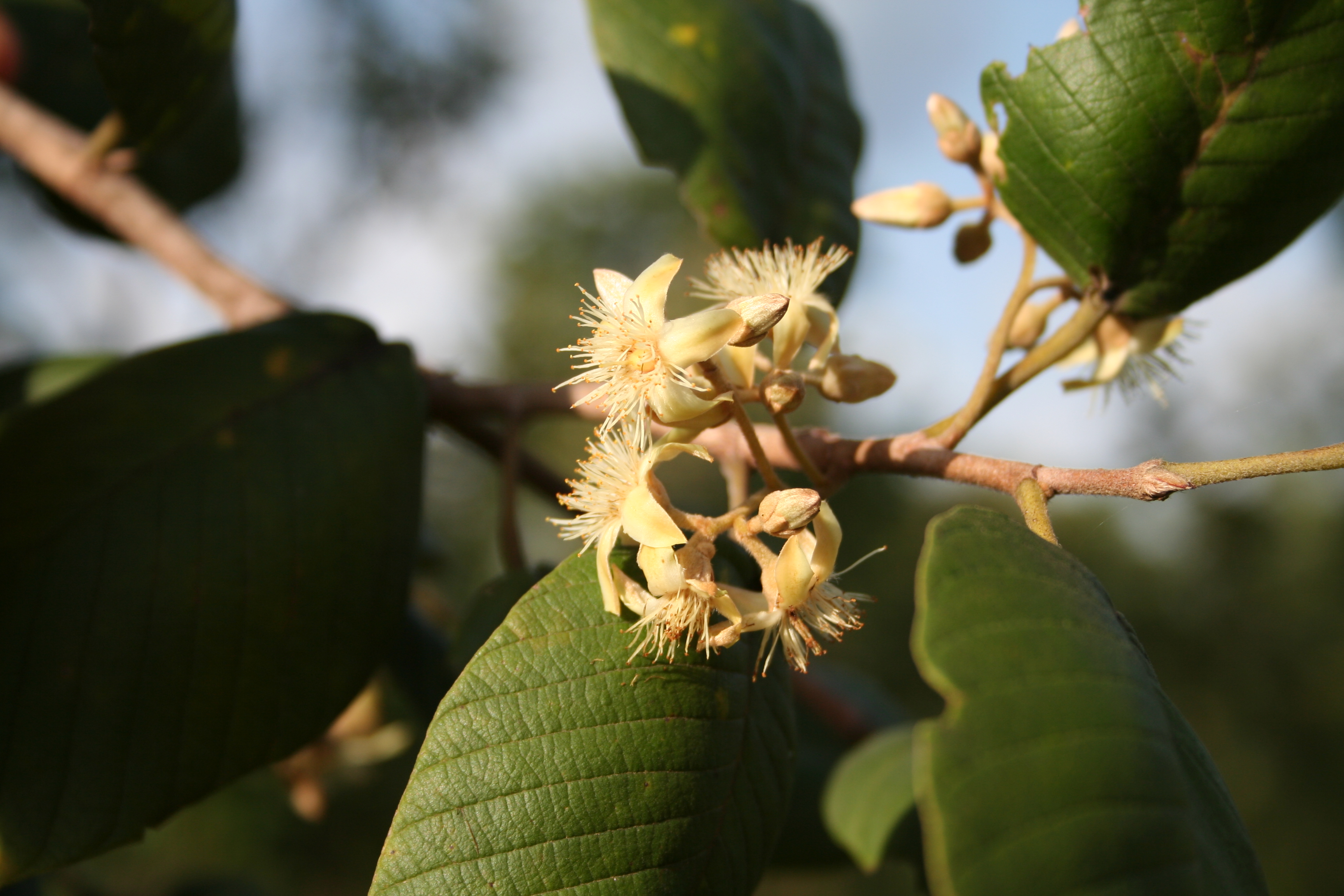
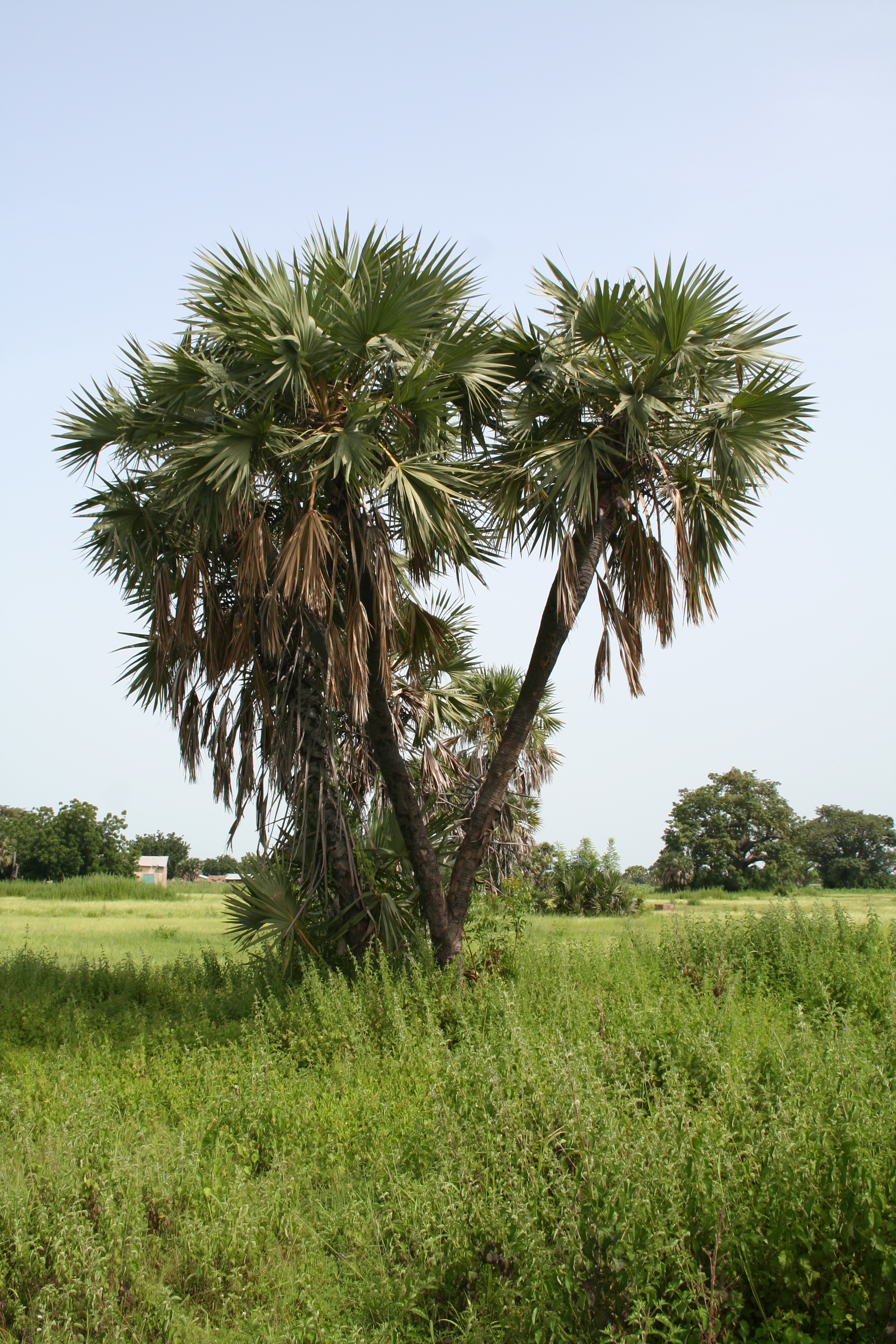
Left: Monotes kerstingii, a plant in the family of Dipterocarpaceae in the Botanical Garden, North Benin. Right: Hyphaene thebaica or gingerbread tree near Porga, Benin

Dense forests are not recorded in Benin. Along the coastal areas coconut, palmyra palms, oil palms are seen up to Abomey, where after vegetation is savanna merged with that of Guinea and Sudan. Other tree species noted are West African ebony, shea tree, Bombax costatum, called the kapok or fromager tree, and Khaya senegalensis, the Senegal mahogany.

The W National Park constitutes the southern limit of tiger bush plateau distribution. Riverine and gallery forests are noted on the banks of the Mekrou River (with seasonal flows), and other tributaries of the Niger River. The plains have an extensive coverage of grasses. The following are some of the plant species found in the savanna woodlands and grassland:

- Adansonia digitata, one of the baobabs
- Anogeissus leiocarpus
- Celtis spp., the 'hackberry'
- Clematis integrifolia
- Boscia senegalensis
- Balanites aegyptiaca
- Bombax costatum, the 'kapok' or French: fromager
- Parkia biglobosa, the 'African locust tree'
- Bauhinia variegata, the 'camel's foot tree'
- Senna reticulata
- Tamarindus indica, the tamarind
- Terminalia avicennioides
- Prosopis africana
- Piliostigma reticulatum

In the evergreen gallery forests, the 'sausage tree' or Kigelia africana and Afzelia africana (the 'lenke' or 'African mahogany') are found. Orchid species are also found here, which are Eulophia cucculata and Eulophia guineensis.

The Pendjari Park consists of grasslands which have no trees or shrubs, shrubs, savanna woodlands, forests along rivers, and shrubs The rocky cliffs of the Pendjari National Park are sparsely wooded. The Volta depression has savanna ecosystem with woodlands and rare species such as Burkea africana, Anogeissus leiocarpus, Pterocarpus erinaceus, Detarium microcarpum, Lannea acida, Sterculia setigera, Combretum ghasalense (syn. Combretum adenogonium) and Acacia spp. On the deep soils of some of the summits and the Atakora escarpment, one finds a greater variety of plant species with Isoberlinia doka and Afzelia africana. The park includes both Guinea savanna woodland and Sudanian savanna, with areas of grassland dominated by Acacia sieberiana and Terminalia macroptera.

The most common species found in the riparian forests are: Pterocarpus santalinoides (Papilionaceae), Cola laurifolia (Sterculiaceae) and Syzygium guineense (Myrtaceae), out of which a few species are endemic and valuable.

=== Traditional medicine ===
Malaria, which is a parasite-born disease, is treated by herbal medicines in Benin. The treatment is based on plant species that are extracted and administered orally or through bathing. There are 85 plant species which are used to make 35 mixtures for treatment.

=== Botanical garden ===
The diversity of plants in Western Africa is preserved at the Papatia Botanical Garden in northern Benin. This garden, which is spread over 12 ha, is a species-rich savanna area where a hundreds of plant species are taken care of. A tree-nursery is part of this garden created to increase rare species.

== Organizations ==
According to the Strategic Plan for the Conservation and Management of Protected Areas approved in 1994, organizations such as the National Centre for Wildlife Management (or in French: Centre National de Gestion des Réserves de la Faune – CENAGREF) were created in 1996 for the sole purpose of the conservation and management of national parks including the buffer zones and the transition areas. The set up of the direction Pendjari National Park and direction of W National Park in 1996 and 1999 respectively are the administrative organizations under the CENAGREF that are responsible for the management of the parks. The Association of Civil Communities in the Protected Areas of the W National Park and the Séri Zone (Association des Communes Riveraines aux Aires Protégées du Parc W et de la Zone de Séri – ACRAP/WS) and Village Associations for the Management of Wildlife Reserves (or Associations Villageoise de Gestion des Reserves de Faune -AVIGREF) were also set up with the responsibility of community training and promoting multi-level communication between farmers and other stakeholders, capacity building and the development of effective governance following decentralized resource management. IUCN has associated with these organizations to address all aspects of management of the natural resources of the W National Park.
