= Tourism in Benin =

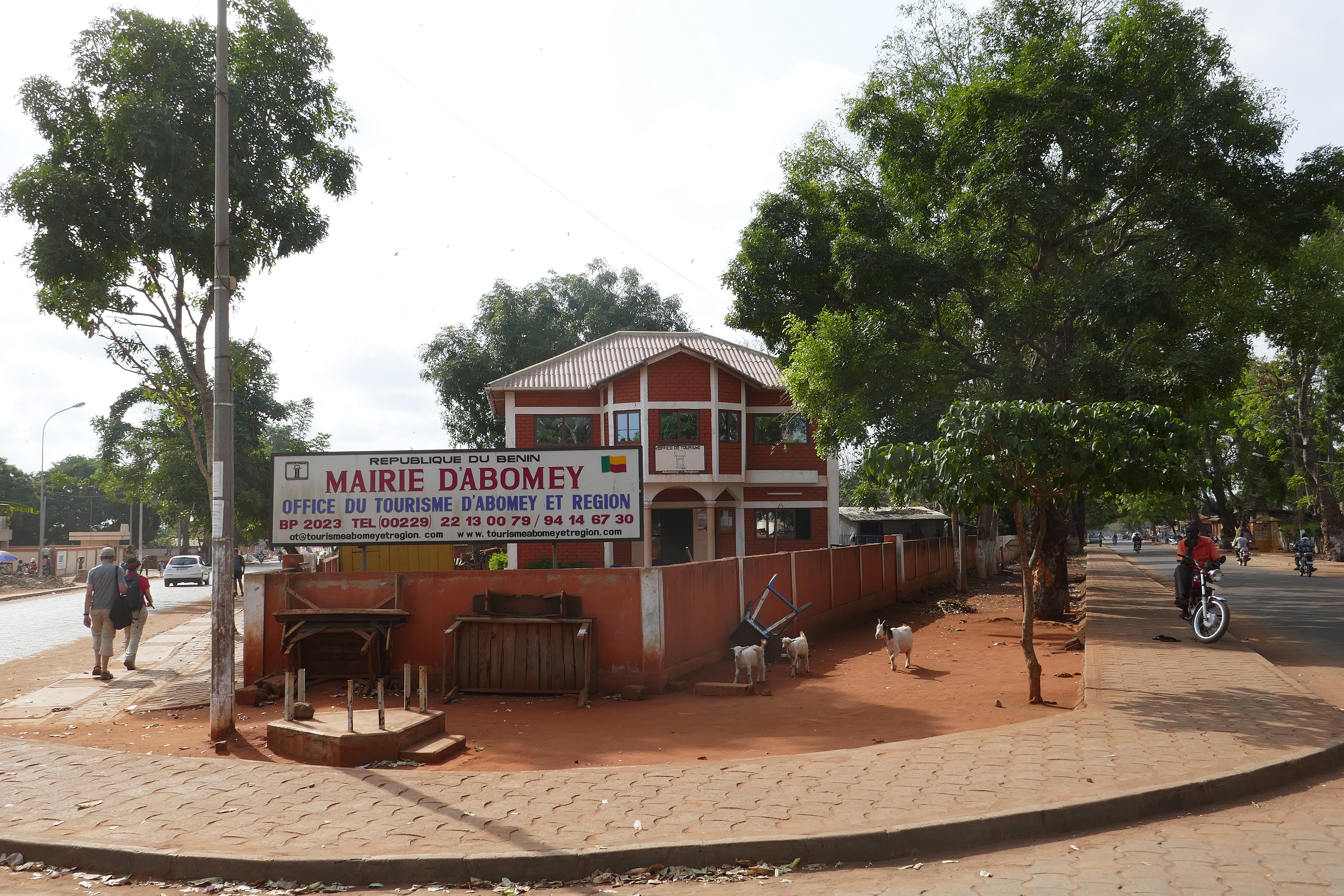
Abomey and Region Tourist Office (Benin).

Tourism in Benin is a small industry. In 1996, Benin had approximately 150,000 tourists. By 2014 number rose to 242,000. A small country with a high concentration of tourist attractions, Benin's national parks and culture are among its main tourist attractions. Abomey is one of Benin's main tourist attractions, with palaces that became a World Heritage Site in 1982. The capital city Porto-Novo's attractions include its museums and architecture.

Cotonou is the only international airport in Benin. There are direct flights to Benin from Belgium, France, and a number of African countries. There are 578 kilometres of railroad in the country, which were developed under a joint effort with the Republic of Niger.

Benin's government regards tourism as a method of diversifying its economy, attracting more foreign investment, and decreasing Benin's dependence on its agricultural industry. Although the government has a National Policy of Tourism Development, it has not made a strong effort to improve tourist facilities or to market Benin as a tourist destination.

Some of the best wildlife areas in West Africa are found in north Benin, where Pendjari National Park and W National Park are located. The best time to see the Pendjari National Park's wildlife is towards the end of the dry season. The park is accessible to travellers and accommodation is available. W National Park is located in Benin's far north, and stretches across Burkina Faso and Niger. The park has a wealth of wildlife, but is difficult to access from Benin.

== See also ==
- Wildlife of Benin
- Music of Benin
- Culture of Benin
- Visa policy of Benin
