= Kolokani =

- Commune and town
- Location in Mali
- Coordinates: 13°35′27″N 8°02′03″W
- Country: Mali
- Region: Koulikoro Region
- Cercle: Kolokani Cercle

Population (2009)
  - Total: 57,307
- Time zone: UTC+0 (GMT)

Kolokani is a town of approximately 57,307 inhabitants in Mali's Koulikoro Region.

== Population ==
It is the capital of the Cercle of Kolokani, which consists of 10 rural communes (Didieni, Guihoyo, Kolokani, Massantola, Nonkon, Nossombougou, Ouolodo, Sagabala, Sebecoro and Tioribougou). The cercle of Kolokani has an area of 14,380 km² and a population of 163,886 inhabitants.

Residents of Kolokani include the iconic musician Mariam Bagayogo, Rokia Traoré and noted bògòlanfini artist Nakunte Diarra.

== See also ==
- List of cities in Mali
