= Tergallic acid =

Trimers of gallic acid

Tergallic acids are trimers of gallic acid, often found naturally in the form of glycosides. Tergallic acid O- or C-glucosides that can be found in acorns of several Quercus (oak) species. The dehydrated tergallic acid C-glucoside and tergallic acid O-glucoside can be characterised in the acorns of Quercus macrocarpa. Dehydrated tergallic-C-glucoside (m/z 613) can be found in the cork from Quercus suber.

Tergallic acid glucosides can also be found in Terminalia chebula.

Tergallic acid dilactone can be found in Rhynchosia volubilis seeds.

The chemical formula is not the same as given by Kinjo et al. (molecule with an ether link between the ellagic and gallic acid residues) or by Cantos, Chapman and Fernandes et al. (molecule with a carbon-carbon link). Cantos, Fernandes and Chapman called the molecule with an ether link valoneic acid dilactone while Kinjo and Shuaibu et al. called the molecule with a carbon-carbon link flavogallonic acid dilactone.
