= Nakunte Diarra =

Malian textile artist (1941 - 2020)

- Born: 1941 (age 84–85); Mali
- Died: 2020
- Occupation: Textile artist
- Known for: bògòlanfini

Nakunte Diarra (born c. 1941, died 7 May 2020) was a Malian textile artist known for her bògòlanfini.

== Life ==
Diarra first learned the basics of bògòlanfini, or mud-dyeing, from her mother and grandmother when she was four years old. This specific craft has been practiced for centuries by women of the Bamana peoples, who live in the Beledougou region in Mali.

She married a farmer, Koumi Traore, and had three children. Like her grandmother before her, Diarra taught mud-dyeing to her granddaughter, and, in a modern twist, also began teaching the craft to men, including her son.

Diarra was based in Kolokani for much of her career, but traveled twice to the US to give workshops and demonstrations of her technique.

== Works ==
Diarra is a textile artist known for her bògòlanfini, or mud cloth. While the popularity of mudcloth and the international market for it has led to a simplification of traditional techniques in pursuit of mass production, even among artisans, Diarra works in the traditional Beledougou style, which is distinct from the mud-cloth traditions of the Dogon people in Mali and from mud-cloth traditions in Côte d'Ivoire. The textile, especially in its traditional form, is seen as a symbol of Malian cultural identity, and it is this that Diarra embraces in her work.

Diarra's work is known for its near-black color, which she achieves by using iron-rich mud from a particular stream near her village: with it, she is able to achieve sharp contrast and clarity in her designs. Her work employs a mix of traditional motifs arranged in fresh compositions. Older, more traditional patterns she has dubbed "Bamalan," and newer designs she calls "Mali," in reference to her (and her country's) independence.

The process of creating these bògòlanfini is highly demanding, both in time and physical labor. Each piece can take between two weeks and two months to finish. Traditionally, the cotton fibers that form the base of the textile are spun into thread by women. Then, men stripweave the cloth on narrow looms; in Diarra's case, it is her husband that makes the cotton strips and then weaves them into a piece of fabric. Then, the fabric is passed back to female artisans for dyeing and design. First, cloths are soaked in a dye bath; different natural dyes are used with different outcomes. After the cloth has been dyed, designs are painted on in mud, which has been gathered from riverbanks and fermented for up to a year in a clay jar. The mud, which acts as a mordant, is then washed away, and, due to the chemical reaction between the mud and the dye, the rich color of the mud remains on the cloth; sometimes, this process is repeated multiple times to get fully saturated, dark colors. Finally, the initial dye is removed from the unpainted parts of the cloth by applying soap or bleach, and the cloth is left in the sun to dry and bleach further.

Diarra's work has some interesting unique aspects. While most mud cloth artists work between the months of October and May, when it is dry and crops don't grow, Diarra works year round, which her husband encourages, even if it means she must take time away from household chores or farming. Additionally, Diarra always paints her designs freehanded, as is traditional, without the use of straight edges or other implements to guide her hand in application of her often-geometrical designs.

== Awards and recognition ==
In 1993, 30 of Diarra's works were displayed in a single-artist exhibition organized by the Indiana University Art Museum that also traveled to the Fashion Institute of Technology and beyond. In 1994, she was hosted in the Ohio home of Dr. Barbara G. Hoffman for a five-week residency at Cleveland State University in conjunction with the exhibition of her work there and at the Cleveland Museum of Art. From Cleveland, the exhibition traveled to the Indianapolis Art Museum. Nine years later, she was a member of the artistic delegation sent by the Malian government to represent the art of bògòlanfini at the Smithsonian Folklife Festival in 2003. Her art was the subject of an article, "Nakunte Diarra: Bogolanfini Artist of the Bélédougou", published in the journal African Arts in 1994, and of a DVD produced by Dr.Barbara G. Hoffman in 2005. Two pieces by Diarra were commissioned for the collection of the Indiana University Art Museum, while other cloths are in the collections of the National Museum of African Art, the National Museum of Natural History, the Cleveland Museum of Art, the Newark Museum of Art and the National Museum of Mali. Diarra's work was represented in the exhibition, "Earth Matters," at the National Museum of African Art in 2014. Diarra was the subject of My Baby, a children's book by Jeanette Winter, featuring a fictional account of the Malian artist as she created mudcloth during her pregnancy for her own child.
