= Groupe Bogolan Kasobané =

Groupe Bogolan Kasobané is an artist collective from Mali, West Africa with a studio in Bamako and a gallery in Ségou. Innovators and pioneers in the bogolan fine arts movement, the Groupe traveled throughout Mali, researching the bogolan traditions and practices, including the symbolic alphabet, as well as the traditional structure, uses, and colors encoded in bogolan cloths. This enabled them to understand the significance and teachings of the cloths which were in danger of being lost. They abandoned modern painting methods and have worked with traditional Mali art materials such as vegetal pigments found in clay and plant dyes, using them on locally grown, hand-woven cotton cloth.

== Etymology ==
In the Bamana language, Kasobané means "prison is finished, we are free" which signifies the Groupe's avoidance of materials that are not their own and the use of materials that are naturally occurring in Mali instead.

== History ==
The members of the Groupe met as students at the Institut National des Arts Institute National des Arts (L'INA) in Bamako in the mid-1970s. At that time, bogolan was rarely seen in urban areas and was fabricated only by rural women. The study of bogolan was also strictly forbidden at the art academy. The Groupe includes Kandioura Coulibaly, Klètigui Dembélé, Boubacar Doumbia, Souleymane Goro, Baba Fallo Keita, and Néné Thiam. Coulibaly rallied five other like-minded artists who fought to employ it in their paintings as a way to reference their Malian heritage. The members of Groupe Bogolan Kasobane subsequently conducted in-depth research throughout Mali, living in villages for months and becoming integrated into the communities. From village practitioners, they learned the vocabulary of symbolic ideograms as well as the meanings of the traditional colors and patterns encoded in bogolan.

Their first exhibition occurred in 1978 in Ségou, Mali and was followed by another the following year in Bordeaux, France. Since the mid-1970s, the Groupe has used bogolan to adorn boubous, and have created bogolan ensembles for members of social groups. In 1983, Groupe Bogolan Kasobané was awarded the Laureat du Concours de Peinture first prize at the Salon BIAO, Goethe Institut, Yaoundé. Their first American exhibition was at the Walter Reade Theatre Gallery at the Lincoln Center for the Performing Arts in New York City in 1998. In 2009, its members were artists in residence at the Residential College in Arts & Humanities at Michigan State University.

== Works ==
Groupe Bogolan Kasobané has interests in cultural preservation and historical research. The group formed specifically to revitalize the bogolanfini textile-dying technique, working the traditional cotton cloth created from handspun and handwoven bands. Along with the collective Atelier Jamana, Groupe Bogolan Kasobané is the most successful and best-known producer of bogolan fine art clothing. The Groupe has also contributed costumes and sets for films including Guimba the Tyrant, which received first prize for costumes and set at the 1995 FESPACO, and Taafe Fanga, which received the prize for art in Japan. Their massive composition, A Tribute to the Anonymous Artists is a tribute to fundamentally anonymous artists.
