= Chris Seydou =

Malian fashion designer (1949–1994)

Seydou Nourou Doumbia
- Born: 18 May 1949; Kati, Mali
- Died: 4 March 1994 (aged 44); Bamako, Mali
- Occupation: Fashion designer
- Known for: Malian fabrics

Seydou Nourou Doumbia, known as Chris Seydou (May 18, 1949 - March 4, 1994), was a Malian fashion designer known for his use of traditional Malian fabrics, particularly bògòlanfini (mudcloth).

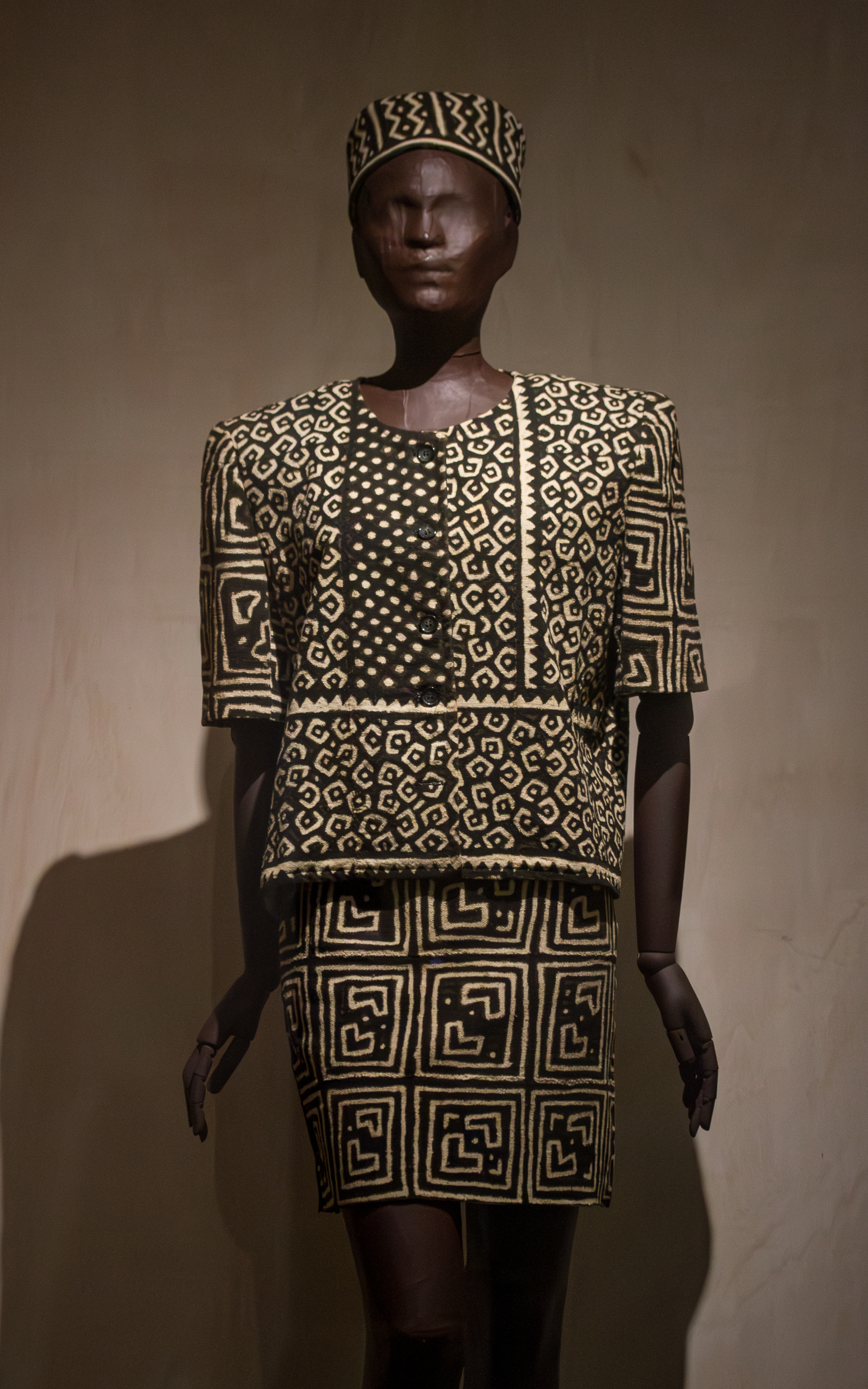

Born in Kati in Mali's Koulikoro Region, Seydou lived part of his childhood in Ouagadougou (now the capital of Burkina Faso) before moving back to Kati with his mother in 1963. Even in childhood, he designed and created clothing to dress dolls and, in 1965, he became an apprentice of the tailor Cheickene Camara at Kati. In 1967, he returned to Ouagadougou where he opened his first tailor shop. He soon moved to Abidjan (1969) and then to Paris (1971), where he worked first for Yves Saint-Laurent and then at Mic Mac with the stylist Tan Guidicelli. At this time he also met designer Paco Rabanne.

Leaving in 1981, Seydou moved again to Abidjan, where he created his Chris Seydou line. For the new line, Seydou designed Western-style jackets and miniskirts from traditional African patterns and fabrics, marketing the clothes in the United States, Europe, and urban West Africa. The designs are particularly noted for their pioneering use of bògòlanfini, traditional mud-dyed cloth.

Seydou returned to Mali in 1990, becoming good friends with soon-to-be-president Alpha Oumar Konaré. In 1993, he founded the African Foundation of Fashion Designers, but died in 1994 with 44 years in Bamako of AIDS. Atelier Chris Seydou, a group of tailors who worked with him in the past, continue to produce a bògòlanfini clothing line in Bamako.
