= Flavogallonic acid =

- Chemical structure of flavogallonic acid

Names
- Preferred IUPAC name 1^{4},1^{5},2^{5},3^{4},3^{5},3^{6}-Hexahydroxy[1^{1},2^{1}:2^{4},3^{1}-terphenyl]-1^{2},2^{2},3^{2}-tricarboxylic acid

Identifiers
3D model (JSmol)	Interactive image
ChemSpider	59661750
PubChem CID	71308200
CompTox Dashboard (EPA)	DTXSID201029764
- InChI: InChI=1S/C21H14O12/c22-12-2-6(7-3-13(23)14(24)4-9(7)20(30)31)8(19(28)29)1-10(12)16-11(21(32)33)5-15(25)17(26)18(16)27/h1-5,22-27H,(H,28,29)(H,30,31)(H,32,33) Key: GAGOUOWDSKMVKE-UHFFFAOYSA-N
- SMILES: OC(=O)c1cc(O)c(O)c(O)c1-c2cc(C(=O)O)c(cc2O)-c(cc3O)c(C(=O)O)cc3O

Properties
Chemical formula	C_{21}H_{14}O_{12}
Molar mass	458.32 g/mol
- Except where otherwise noted, data are given for materials in their standard state (at 25 °C [77 °F], 100 kPa). verify (what is ?) Infobox references

Flavogallonic acid is a hydrolysable tannin that can be found in valonea oak (Quercus macrolepis) in chestnut wood or in Terminalia myriocarpa.

== See also ==
- Flavogallonic acid dilactone
