= Flavogallonic acid dilactone =

- Chemical structure of flavogallonic acid dilactone

Names
- Preferred IUPAC name 3,4,5-Trihydroxy-2-(1,6,7-trihydroxy-4,9-dioxo-4,9-dihydro[1]benzopyrano[5,4,3-cde][1]benzopyran-2-yl)benzoic acid

Identifiers
CAS Number	103744-88-3
3D model (JSmol)	Interactive image
ChemSpider	57539155
PubChem CID	71308199
CompTox Dashboard (EPA)	DTXSID70745436
- InChI: InChI=1S/C21H10O12/c22-8-2-5(19(28)29)10(16(27)14(8)25)4-1-6-11-12-7(21(31)32-17(11)13(4)24)3-9(23)15(26)18(12)33-20(6)30/h1-3,22-27H,(H,28,29) Key: ICEBGCDIMFYRLU-UHFFFAOYSA-N
- SMILES: O=c4oc3c1c(c(c2O)oc(=O)c1cc(O)c3O)c4cc2-c(c(O)c5O)c(C(O)=O)cc5O

Properties
Chemical formula	C_{21}H_{10}O_{12}
Molar mass	454.29 g/mol
- Except where otherwise noted, data are given for materials in their standard state (at 25 °C [77 °F], 100 kPa). verify (what is ?) Infobox references

Flavogallonic acid dilactone is a hydrolysable tannin that can be found in Rhynchosia volubilis seeds, in Shorea laevifolia, in Anogeissus leiocarpus and Terminalia avicennoides.

== See also ==
- Flavogallonic acid
