= Bògòlanfini =

Malian dyed cotton fabric

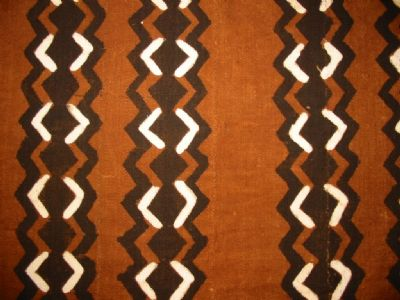
Bògòlanfini fabric

Bògòlanfini or bogolan (Bambara: bɔgɔlanfini; "mud cloth"; sometimes called mud-dyed cloth or mud-painted cloth in English) is a handmade Malian cotton fabric traditionally dyed with fermented mud. It has an important place in traditional Malian culture and has, more recently, become a symbol of Malian cultural identity. The cloth is exported worldwide for use in fashion, fine art and decoration.

== Origins and etymology ==
The dye technique is associated with several Malian ethnic groups, but the Bamana version has become best known outside Mali. In the Bambara language, the word bògòlanfini is a composite of bɔgɔ, meaning "earth" or "mud"; lan, meaning "with" or "by means of"; and fini, meaning "cloth". Although usually translated as "mud cloth," bògòlan actually refers to slip clay with a high iron content. The iron in the clay will stain handspun and handwoven cotton textiles black.

== Production ==
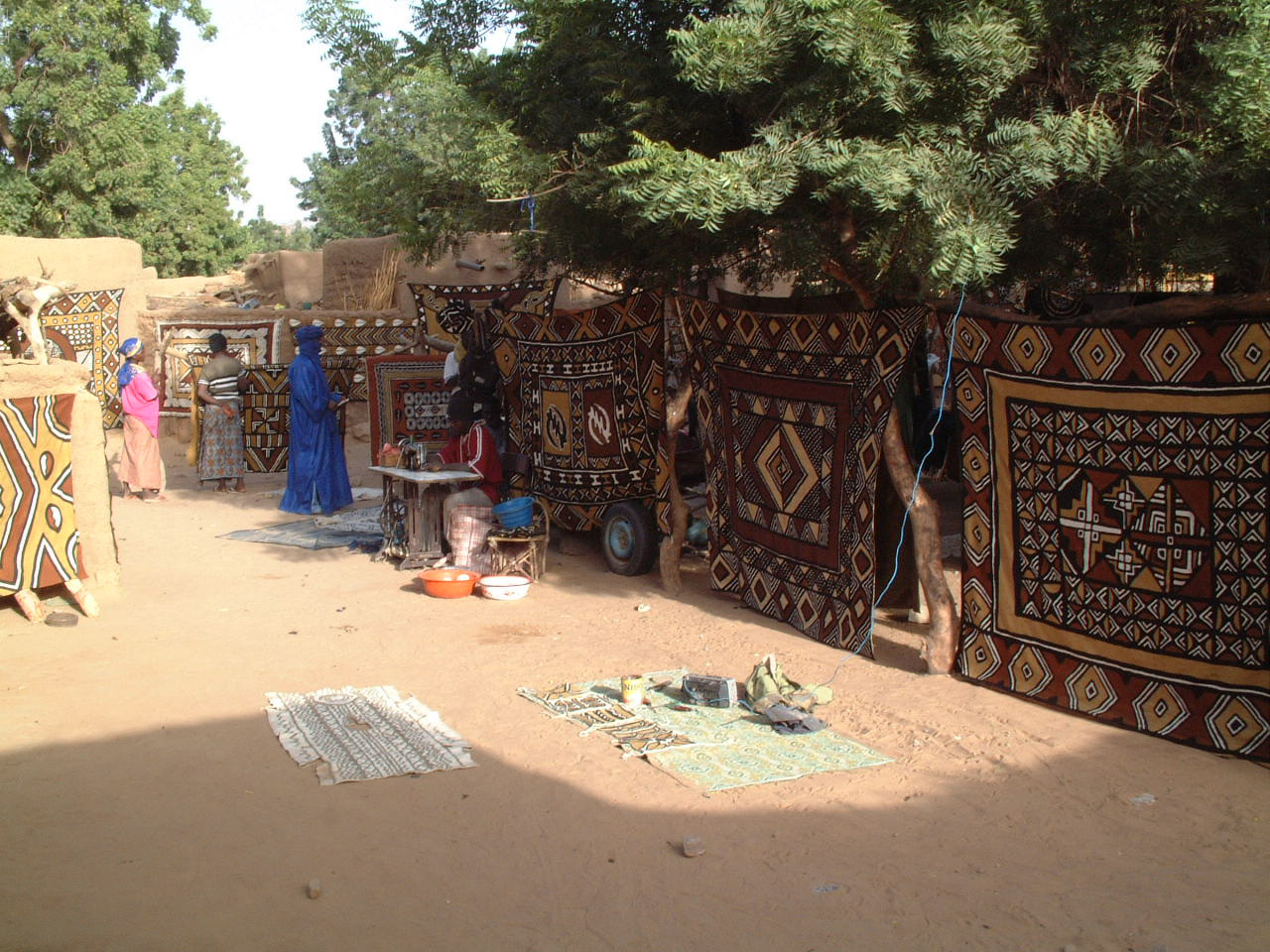
Bògòlanfini in the market of Enndé

The center of bògòlanfini production, and the source of the highest quality cloth, is the town of San.

=== Traditional production ===
In traditional bògòlanfini production, men weave the cloth and women dye it. On narrow looms, strips of cotton fabric about 15 centimetres (5.9 in) wide are woven and stitched into cloths about 1 metre (3 ft) wide and 1.5 metres (5 ft) long.

The dyeing (a "strange and cumbersome technique", according to Donne (1973)) begins with a step invisible in the finished product: The cloth is soaked in a dye bath made from leaves of the n'gallama tree (Anogeissus leiocarpa) that have been mashed, and then boiled or soaked. Now yellow, but not yet color-fast, the cloth is sun-dried and then painted with designs using a metal tool or wooden stick, and carefully and repeatedly applied to outline the intricate motifs. The paint is made from a specially selected mud, collected from riverbeds and fermented for up to a year in a clay jar. Because of a chemical reaction between the treated mud and the dyed cloth, the brown color remains after the mud has been washed off. Finally, the yellow n'gallama dye is removed from the unmarked parts of the cloth by applying soap or bleach, rendering the finished cloth white with dark marks where it was painted.

After long use, the very dark brown color turns a variety of rich tones of brown, while the unpainted underside of the fabric retains a pale russet color.

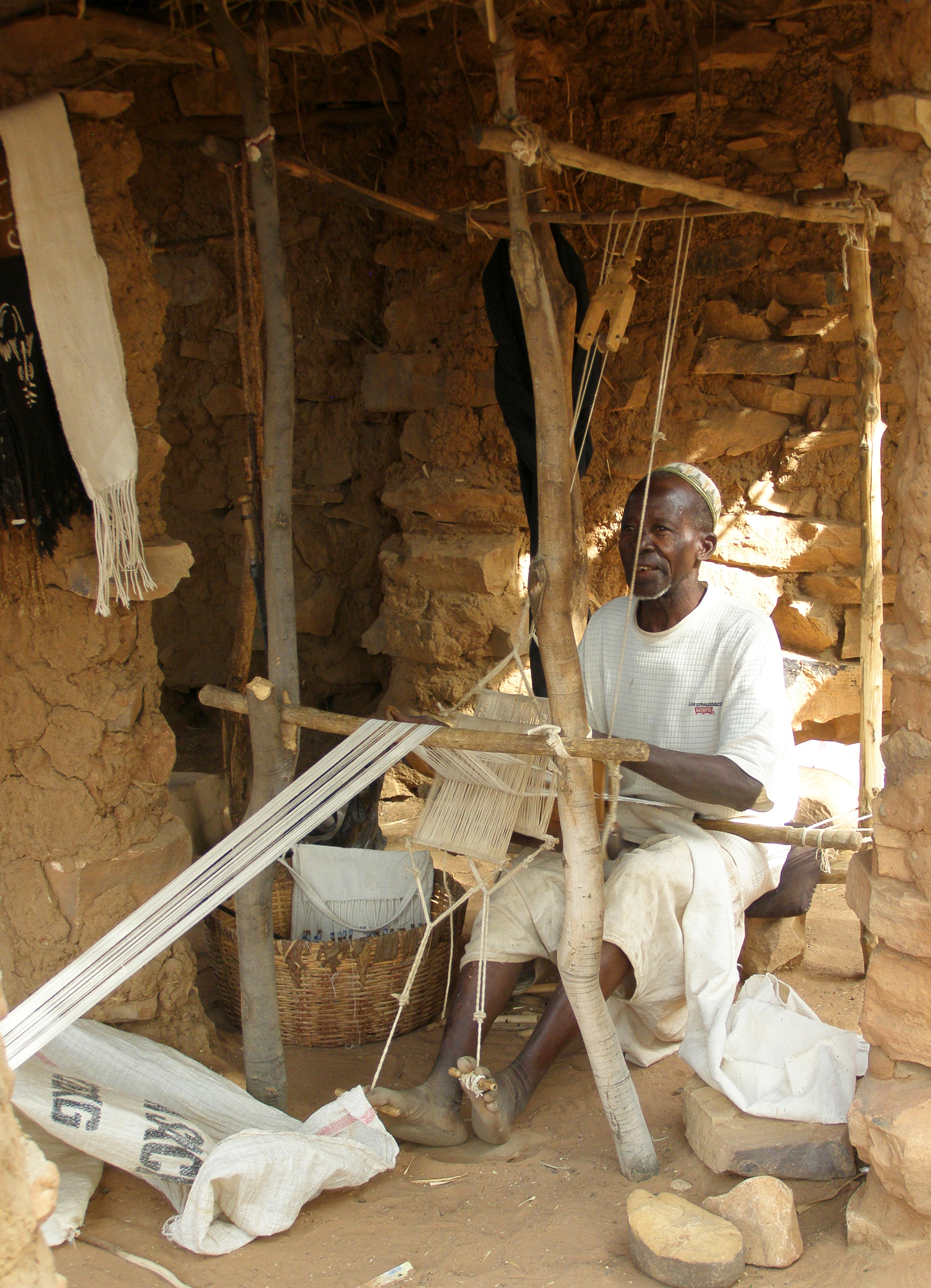
Bogolan, Mali

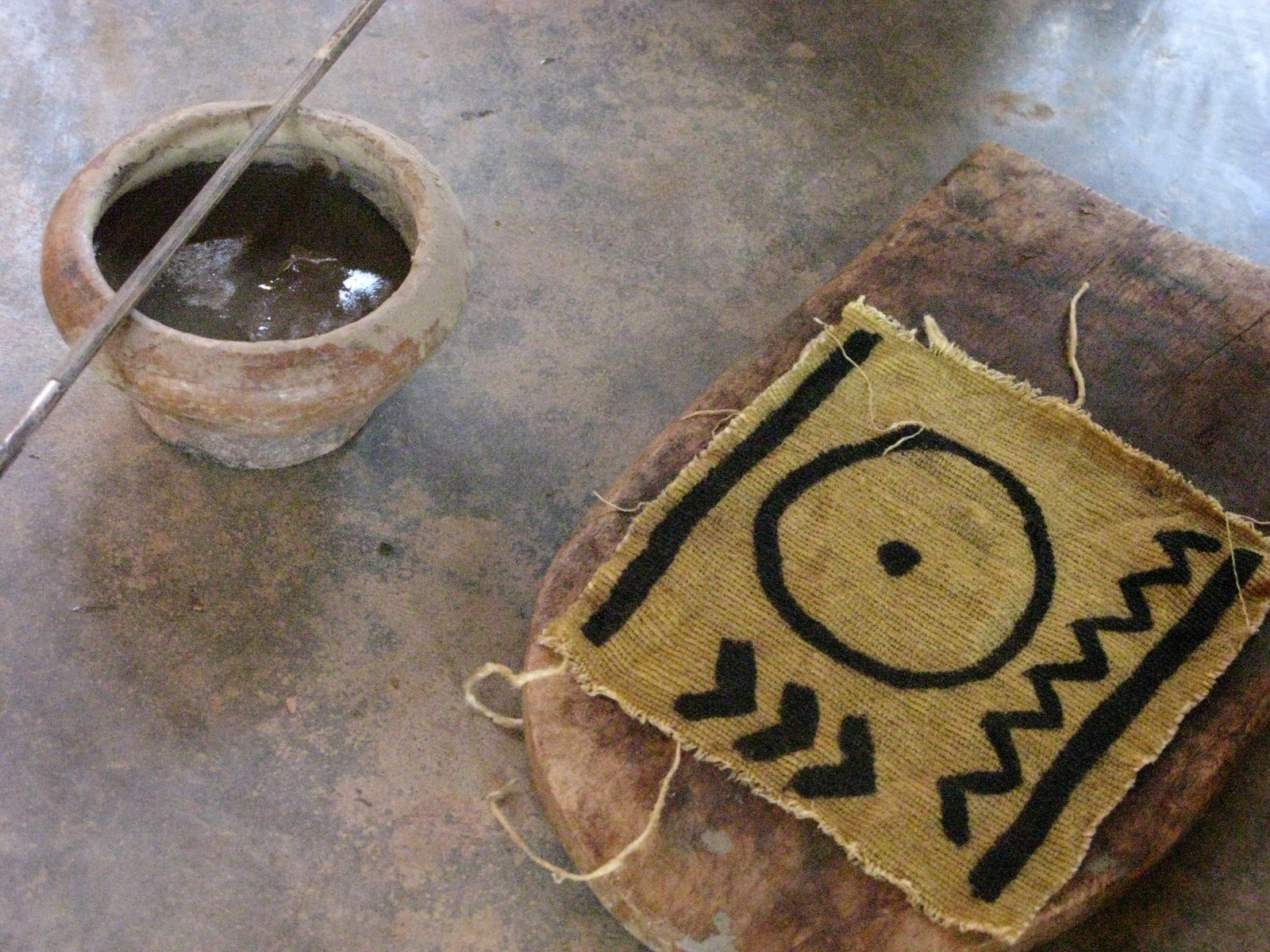
Ségou

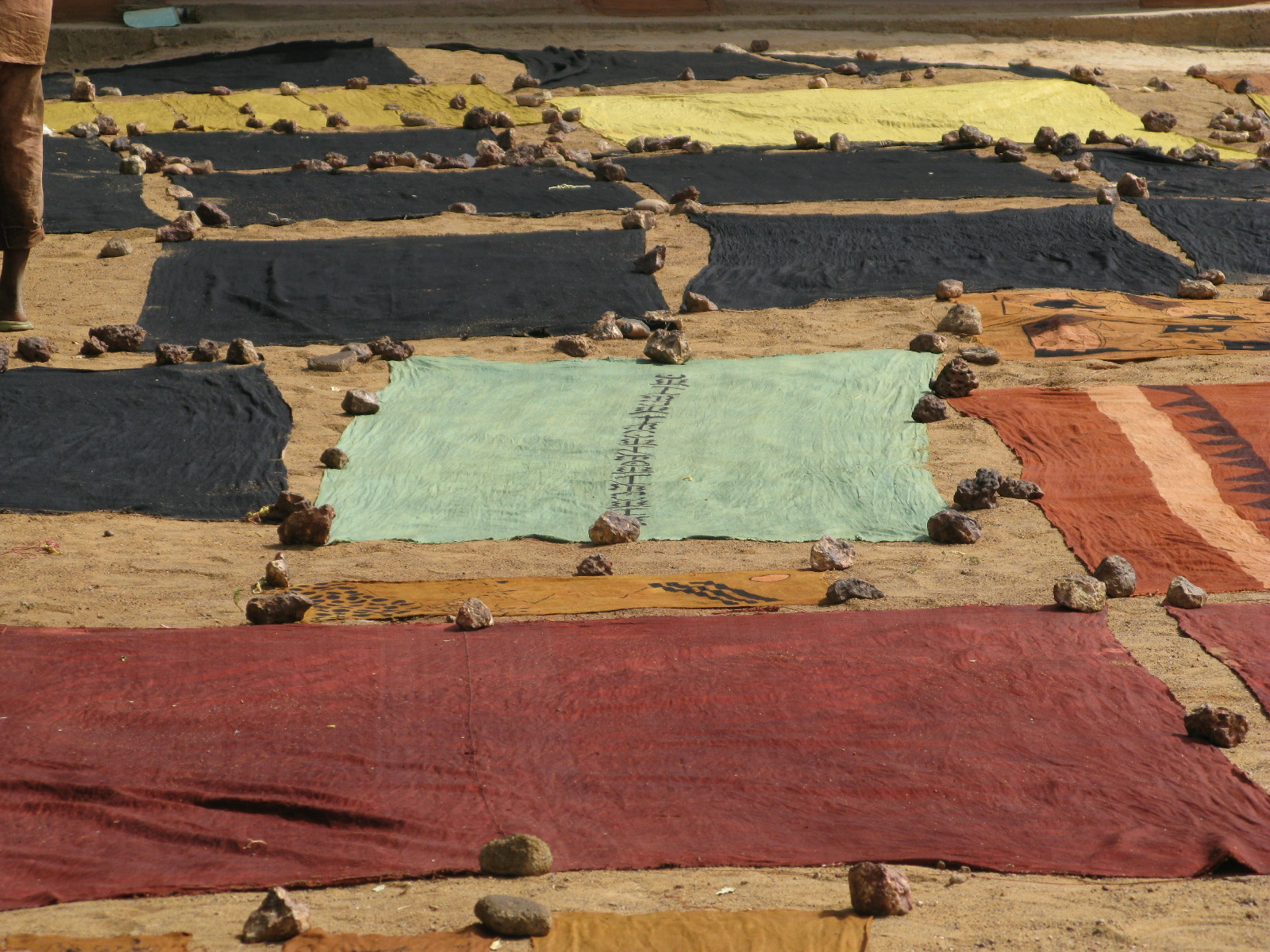
Ségou

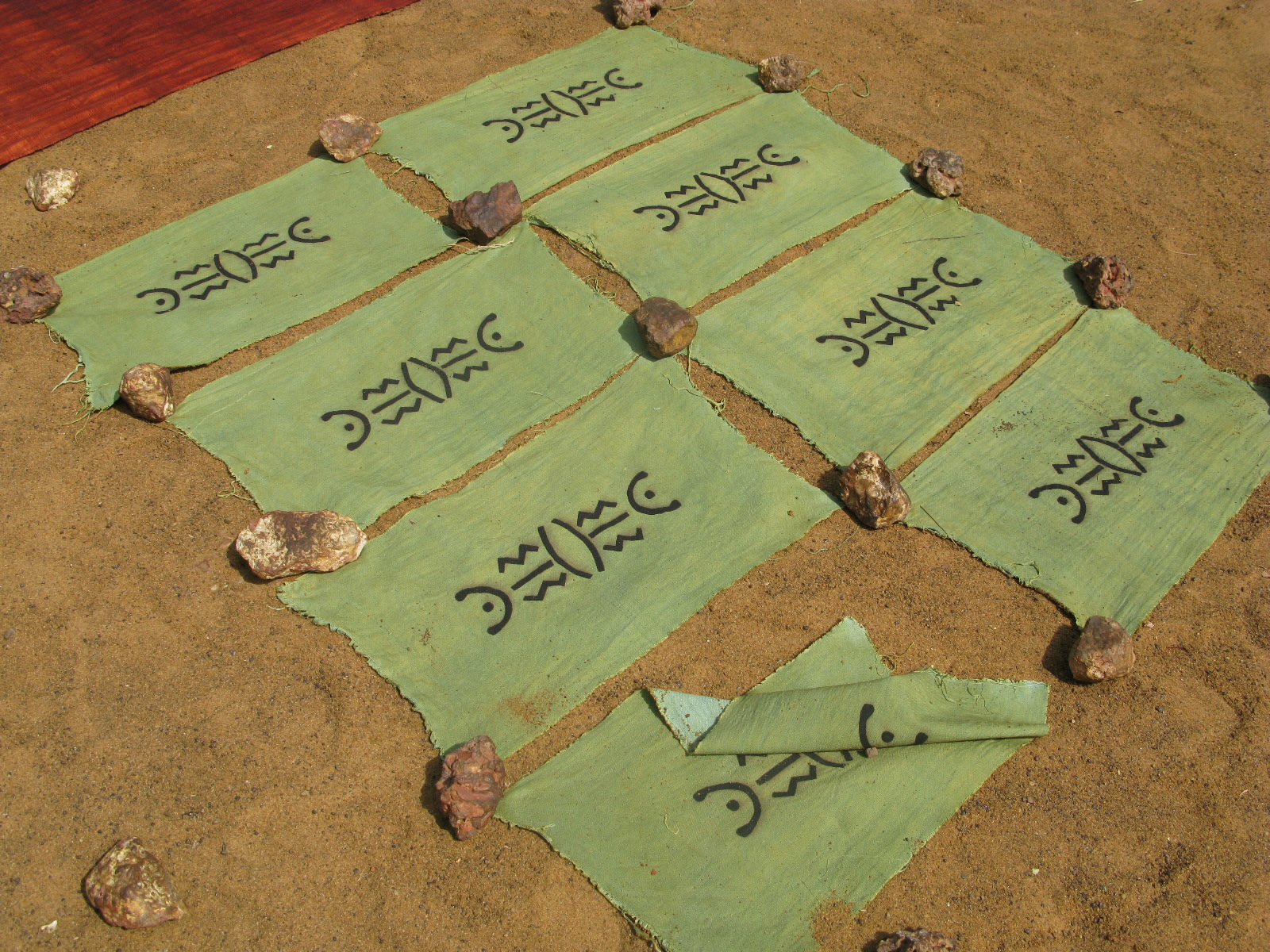
Ségou

=== Variants and modern production ===
Around Mopti and Djenné, a much simpler method is used by artists considered to be of inferior skill: The cloth is dyed yellow in wolo solution, made from the leaves of Terminalia avicennoides, and then painted over with black designs. The yellow is either removed, producing a stark black and white design, or painted a deep orange with a solution from the bark of M'Peku (Lannea velutina).

Based on these simplified techniques, as of around 2000 large quantities of bògòlanfini are being mass-produced for tourist and export markets. These fabrics use simpler designs, often applied by stencil, painted in black on a yellow or orange background. With this method, the cloth can be produced about six to seven times faster. The democratic reforms after the overthrow of Moussa Traoré in 1991 caused many young men to lose their previously guaranteed government jobs and scholarships. This led many to take up bògòlanfini production. Consequently, most cloth is now produced by men rather than women, and the traditional year-long apprenticeships have been replaced by short, informal training sessions.

== Cultural significance ==
In traditional Malian culture, bògòlanfini is worn by hunters and serves as camouflage, ritual protection, and a badge of status. Women are wrapped in bògòlanfini after their initiation into adulthood (which includes genital mutilation) and immediately after childbirth, as the cloth is believed to have the power to absorb the dangerous forces released under such circumstances.

Bògòlanfini patterns are rich in cultural significance, referring to historical events (such as a famous battle between a Malian warrior and the French), crocodiles (significant in Bambara mythology), and other objects, mythological concepts, or proverbs. Since about 1980, Bògòlanfini has become a symbol of Malian cultural identity and is being promoted as such by the Malian government.

== Uses ==
Bògòlanfini has become a popular Malian export, notably to the United States. There, it is marketed as mud cloth, either as a symbol of African American culture, or as a generically "ethnic" decorative cloth.

=== In fashion ===
Bogolanfini clothing making.

In Mali, the cloth is worn by people of all ethnicities, including prominently in Malian cinema and by Malian musicians, either as an expression of national or ethnic identity or as a fashion statement. Particularly popular among young people, bògòlanfini is made into a wide range of clothes, including Western miniskirts and jackets as well as traditional flowing robes (boubous).

The Malian fashion designer Chris Seydou has been credited with popularizing bògòlanfini in international fashion.

=== In art ===
Bògòlanfini is also produced as fine art by several Malian artists, notably by the Groupe Bogolan Kasobané, six artists collaborating since 1978. These paintings are produced with vegetable dyes and mud, but often feature designs unrelated to those of traditional fabrics; their newer motifs are also often found on clothing. Other notable creators include Nakunte Diarra.

Traditional bògòlanfini designs are also used for on a wide range of commercial products, such as coffee mugs, curtains, towels, sheets, book covers and wrapping paper.

== Bibliography ==
- Donne, J.B. (1973). "Bogolanfini: A mud-painted cloth from Mali". Man. 8 (1): 104–107. doi:10.2307/2800615. JSTOR 2800615.
- Goldner, Janet (2008). The Poetics of Cloth. Grey Art Gallery. New York University. ISBN 978-0-615-22083-3.
- Rovine, Victoria L. (2005). "Bogolan". In Steele, Valerie (ed.). Encyclopedia of Clothing and Fashion. Vol. 1. Thomson Gale. pp. 169–170. ISBN 0-684-31394-4.
- Toerien, Elsje S. (2003). "Mud cloth from Mali: Its making and use". Journal of Family Ecology and Consumer Sciences. 31: 52–57. ISSN 0378-5254.
