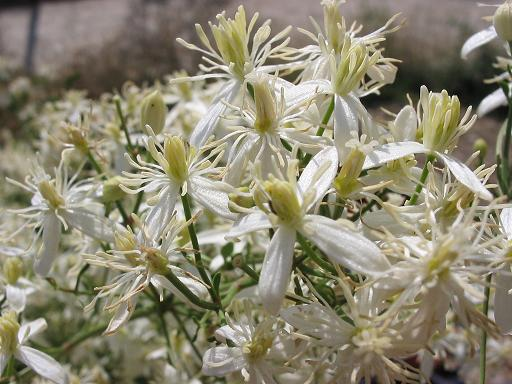

Scientific classification
- Kingdom: Plantae
- Clade: Tracheophytes
- Clade: Angiosperms
- Clade: Eudicots
- Order: Ranunculales
- Family: Ranunculaceae
- Genus: Clematis
- Species: C. flammula

Binomial name
- Clematis flammula L.

= Clematis flammula =

Species of flowering plant in the buttercup family

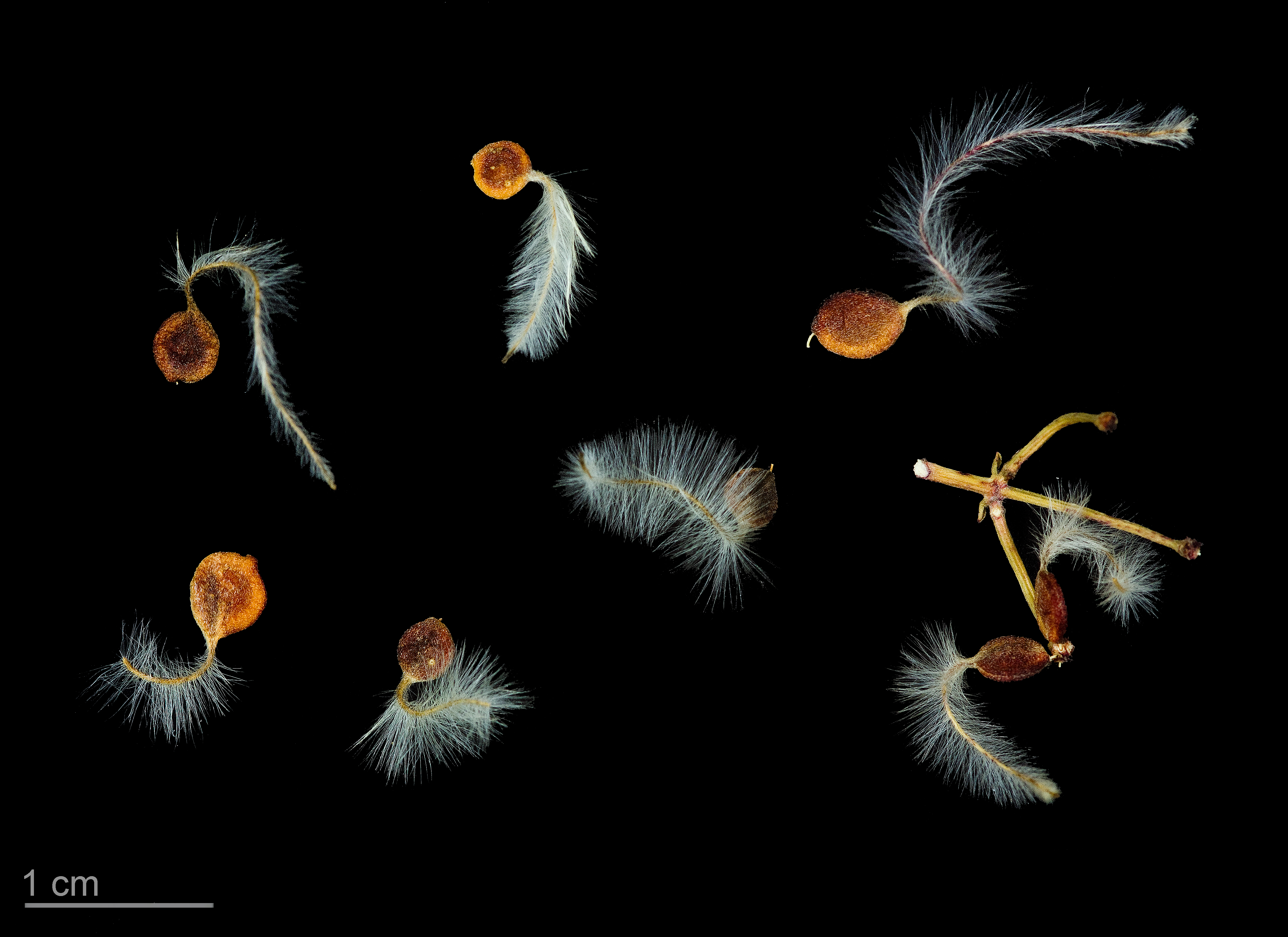
Clematis flammula – MHNT

Clematis flammula, the fragrant virgin's bower, is a species of flowering plant in the family Ranunculaceae. This deciduous climbing plant is native to southern Europe and northern Africa, but it is cultivated worldwide as an ornamental plant in gardens. It bears fragrant white flowers and small green achenes. When the flowers are newly opened they have a strong sweet almond fragrance. Clematis × aromatica, the scented clematis, is the result of a cross with Clematis integrifolia.

Clematis flammula grows in a tangled mass that is heavily sprinkled with flowers throughout the warmer months. It is popular with gardeners as a decoration along fences and trellises, or as ground cover. If it has no other plants or structures to climb on, it will climb on itself, forming a large, densely tangled bush. The plant sends out many shoots and can reach over five metres in height.

In some areas, this species has become a nuisance after its introduction. It is a weed outside of gardens and landscaped areas.

Clematis flammula var. maritima is a hardier variety that is adapted to sand dunes. It is currently being studied as an agent of soil stabilization on eroded sandy beaches.

== Diseases ==
C. flammula suffers from Tomato spotted wilt virus.
