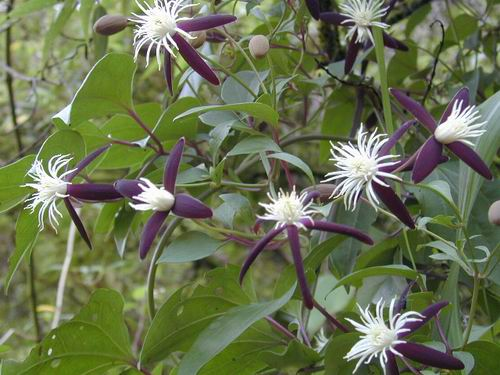
- Flowers

Scientific classification
- Kingdom: Plantae
- Clade: Tracheophytes
- Clade: Angiosperms
- Clade: Eudicots
- Order: Ranunculales
- Family: Ranunculaceae
- Genus: Clematis
- Species: C. × aromatica

Binomial name
- Clematis × aromatica Lenné & K.Koch

= Clematis × aromatica =

Hybrid species of plant

Clematis × aromatica, the scented clematis, is a hybrid species of flowering plant in the family Ranunculaceae. Its parents are Clematis flammula and Clematis integrifolia. A non-clinging perennial with strongly scented flowers, it is widely available from commercial nurseries.
