= Enndé =

- Village
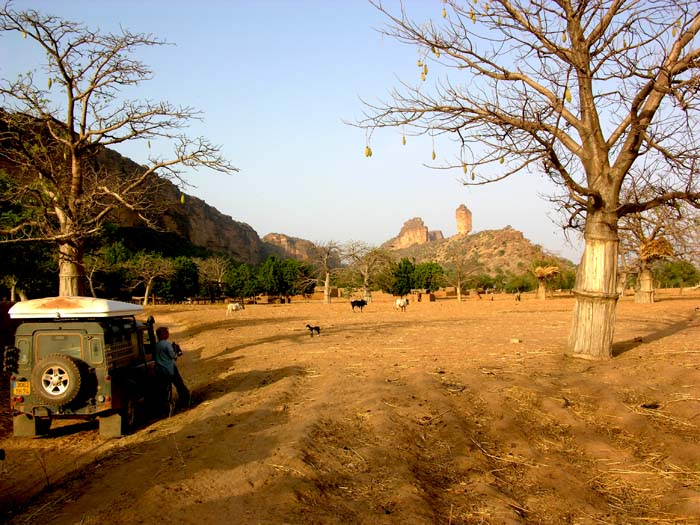

- Location in Mali
- Coordinates: 14°12′N 3°32′W
- Country: Mali
- Region: Mopti Region
- Cercle: Bandiagara Cercle
- Commune: Bandiagara
- Time zone: UTC+0 (GMT)

Enndé is a village in the commune of Bandiagara in the Cercle of Bandiagara in the Mopti Region of south-east Mali.
