= Terminalia avicennioides =

Scientific classification
- Kingdom: Plantae
- Clade: Tracheophytes
- Clade: Angiosperms
- Clade: Eudicots
- Clade: Rosids
- Order: Myrtales
- Family: Combretaceae
- Genus: Terminalia
- Species: T. avicennioides

Binomial name
- Terminalia avicennioides Guill. & Perr. Fl. Seneg. Tent. 1: 277. t. 64 (1832)

Synonyms
- Terminalia avicennoides

Species of tree

Terminalia avicennioides (Bambara: Wolobugun) is a tree species in the genus Terminalia found in West Africa.

Castalagin and flavogallonic acid dilactone are hydrolysable tannins found in T. avicennoides.

== See also ==
- Bògòlanfini, a handmade Malian cotton fabric dyed yellow in wool solution, made from the leaves of T. avicennoides
