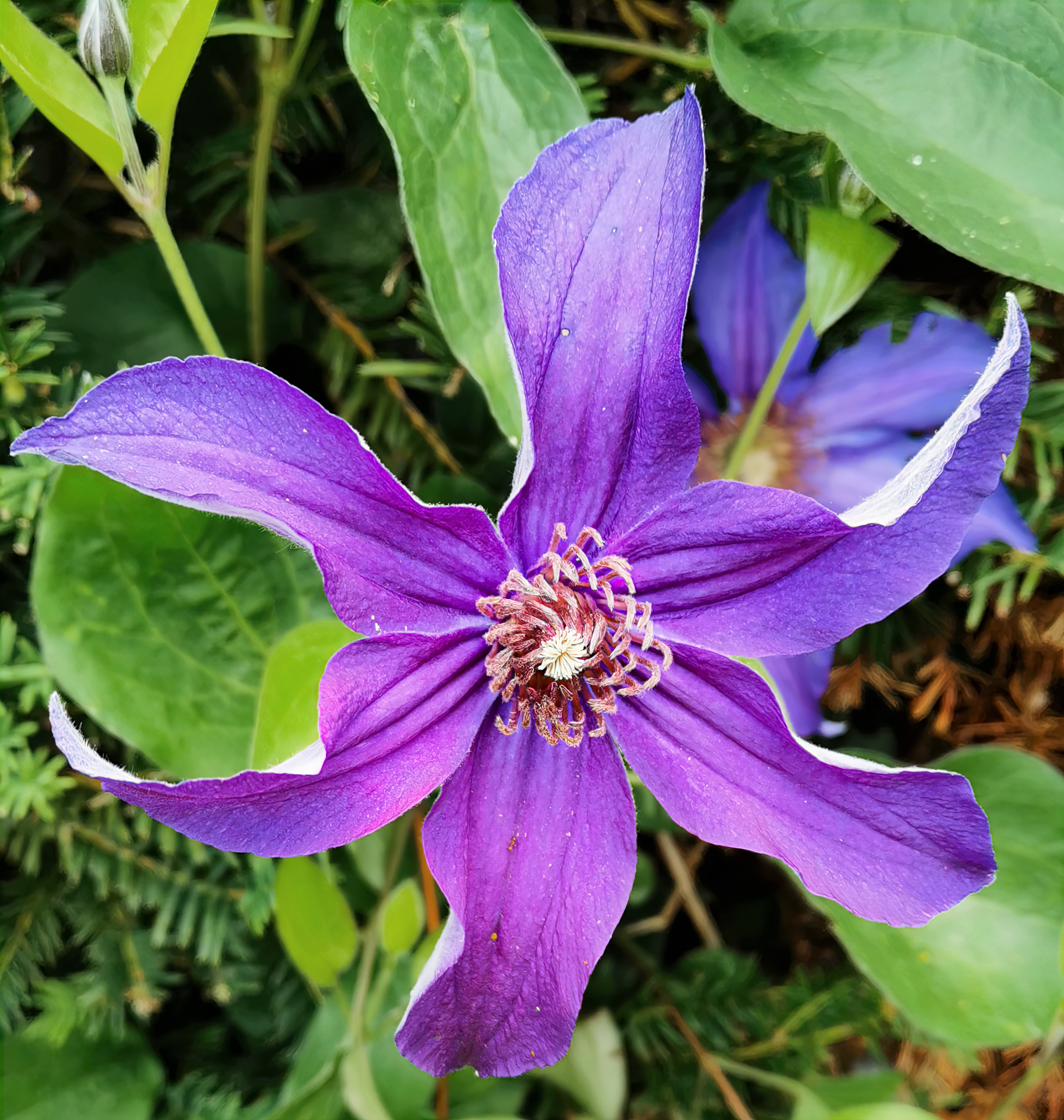

Scientific classification
- Kingdom: Plantae
- Clade: Tracheophytes
- Clade: Angiosperms
- Clade: Eudicots
- Order: Ranunculales
- Family: Ranunculaceae
- Genus: Clematis
- Species: C. integrifolia

Binomial name
- Clematis integrifolia L.

= Clematis integrifolia =

Species of flowering plant in the buttercup family

Clematis integrifolia is a flowering vine of the genus Clematis. Like many members of that genus, it is prized by gardeners for its showy flowers. C. integrifolia bears nodding, urn-shaped blue flowers in summer that are 1.5 inches wide. It is a fairly short variety, growing only to 3 feet high. It is native to Europe and Asia. In the US it grows best in American Horticultural Society zones 8 to 1.

Several popular hybrids have been made by crossing C. integrifolia with other Clematis species. C. 'Hendersonii' is a cross with C. viticella, and C. 'Durandii' is a cross with C. x jackmanii. Clematis × aromatica is the result of a cross with Clematis flammula.

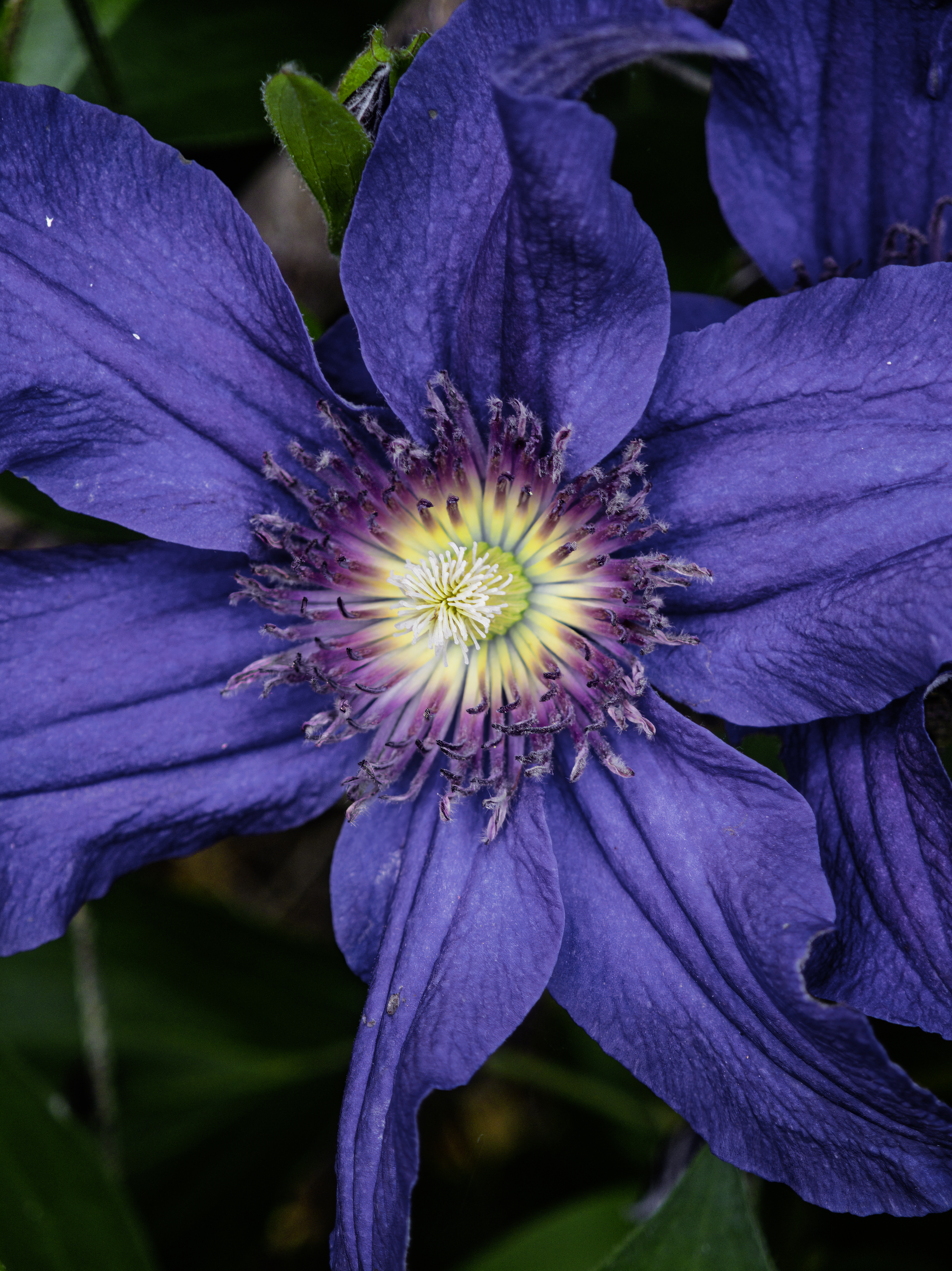
Stamen

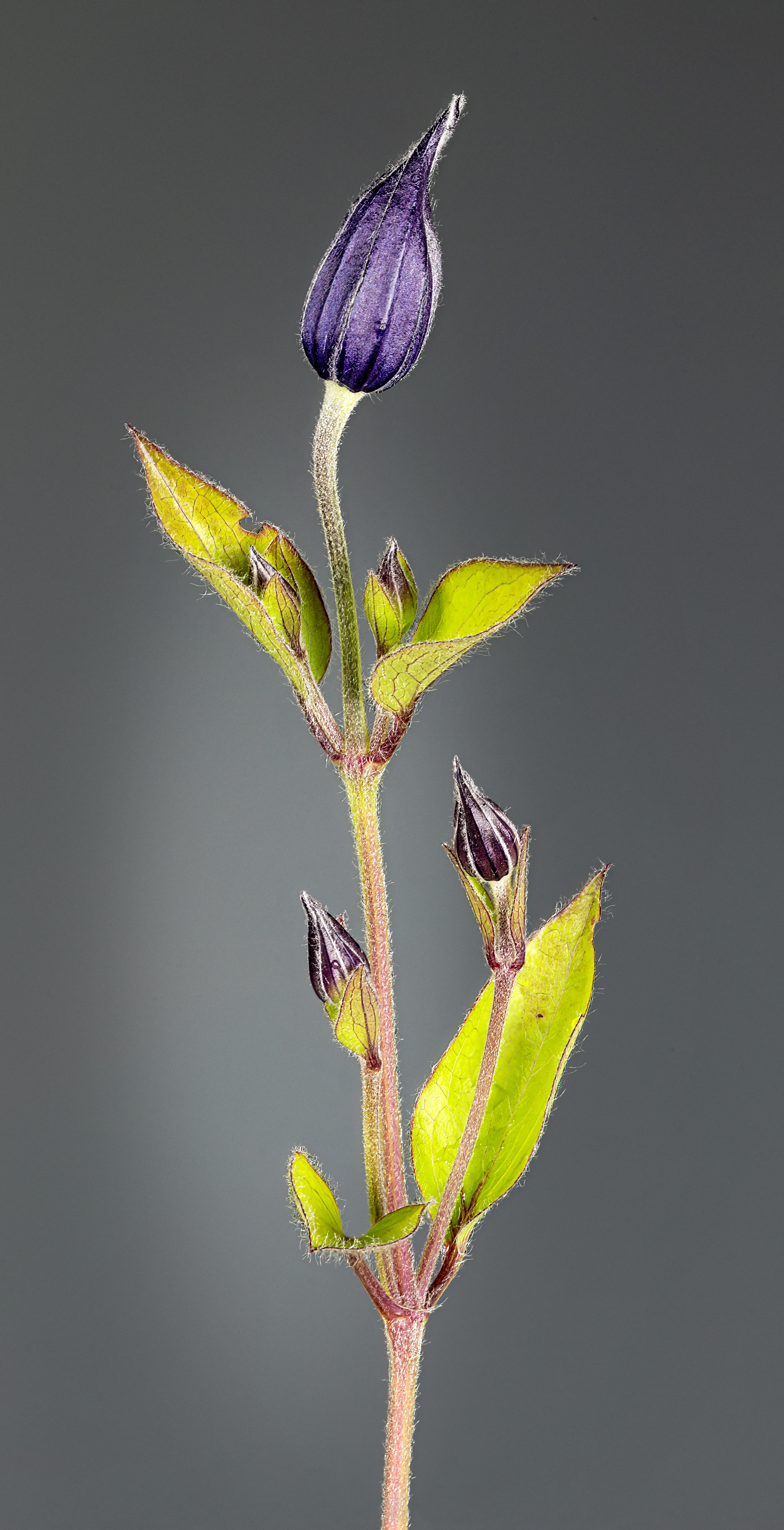
Buds and young leaves

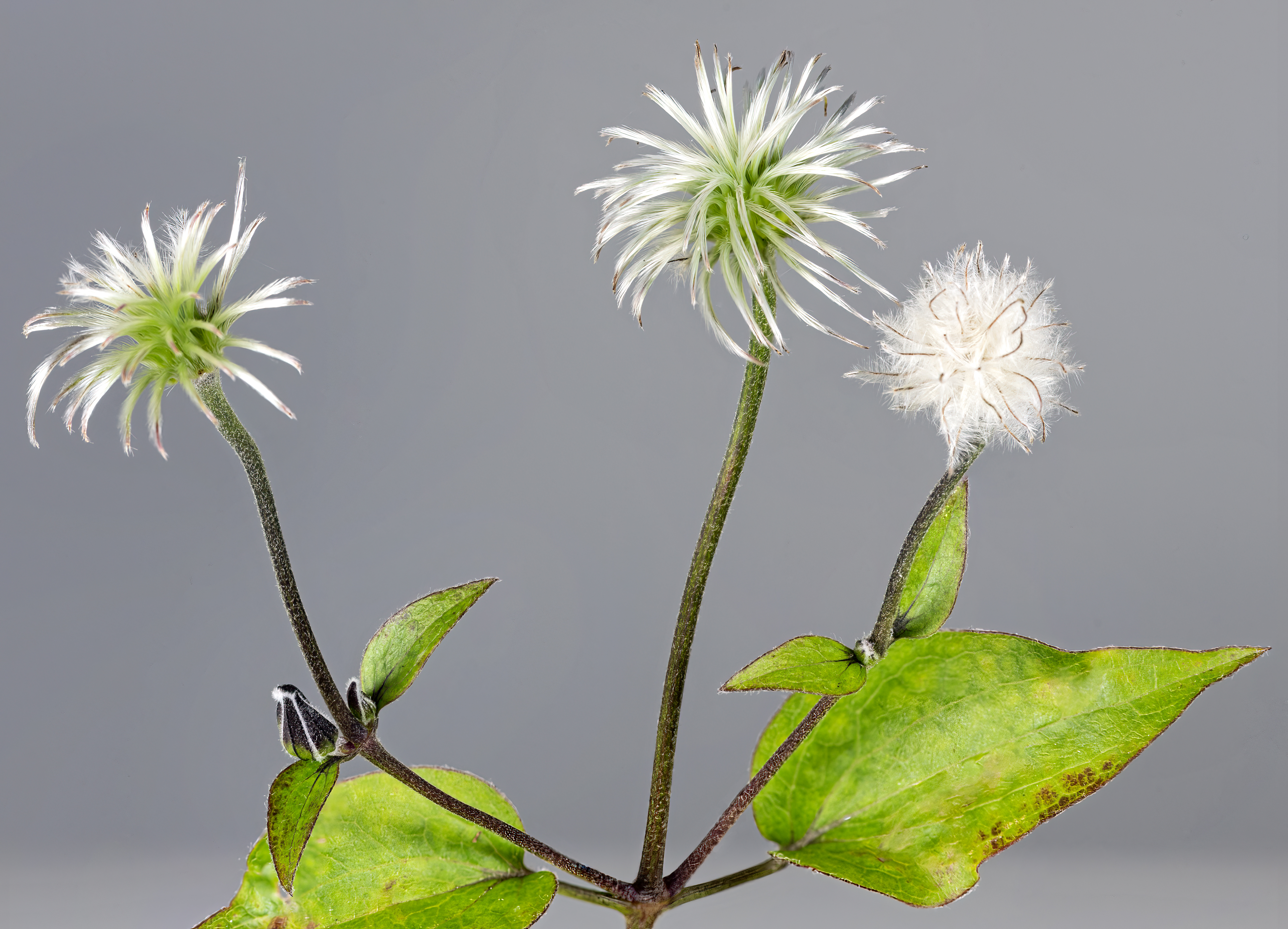
Fruits ripening

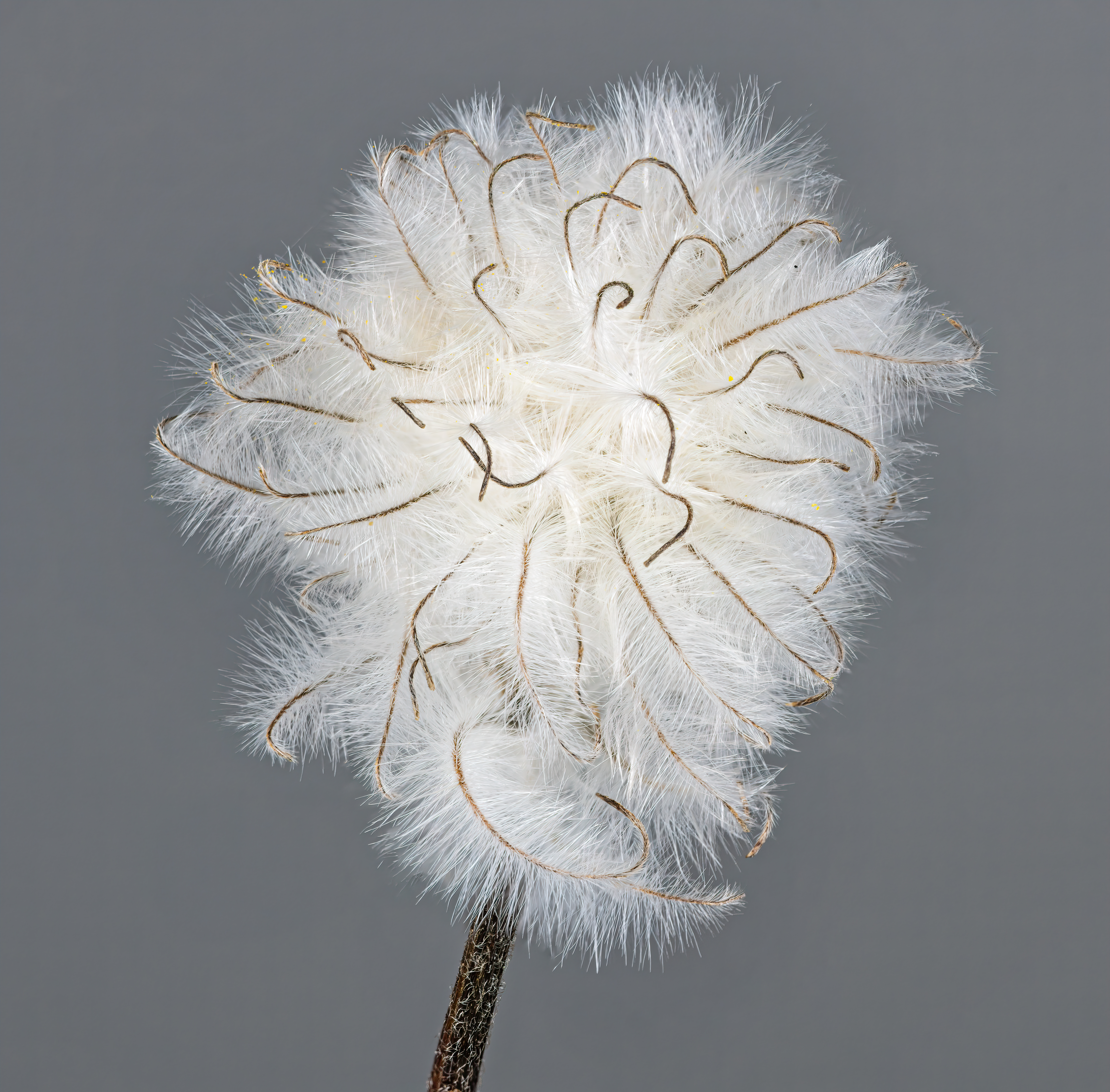
Mature fruit
