= Rhynchosia volubilis =

Scientific classification
- Kingdom: Plantae
- Clade: Tracheophytes
- Clade: Angiosperms
- Clade: Eudicots
- Clade: Rosids
- Order: Fabales
- Family: Fabaceae
- Subfamily: Faboideae
- Genus: Rhynchosia
- Species: R. volubilis

Binomial name
- Rhynchosia volubilis Lour.

Species of legume

Rhynchosia volubilis is a species of flowering plant in the family Fabaceae. It is native to Southeast China, Hainan, Japan, Korea, Nansei-shoto, Taiwan, and Vietnam.

Tergallic acid dilactone can be found in R. volubilis seeds.
