= Papatia Botanical Garden =

Botanical garden in Northern Benin

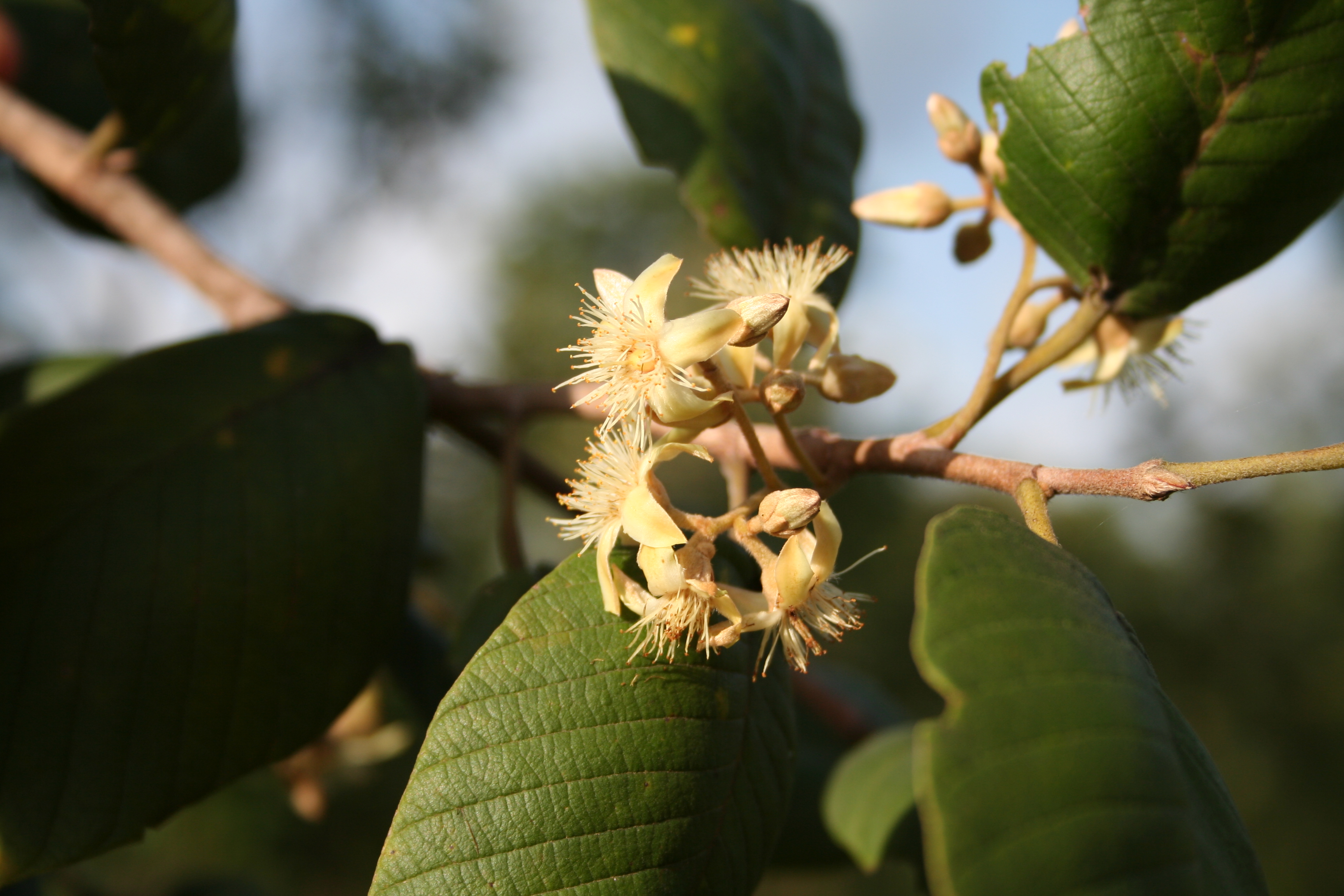
- Monotes kerstingii in the Papatia Botanical Garden.

- Location within Benin
- Type: Botanical garden
- Location: Papatia, Benin
- Coordinates: 10.038°N 1.493°E
- Area: 12 hectares (30 acres)
- Opened: 2001
- Founder: Fula people

The Botanic Garden of Papatia is located in Papatia, Sina-Issire, Northern Benin. Founded in 2001, it was the first garden created in Northern Benin. It was created by the local Fula people, a traditionally semi-nomadic ethnicity, support was provided by an NGO, the Goethe University Frankfurt and the National University of Benin. The 12 hectares (30 acres) garden has a totally protected core zone of approximately 5 hectares (12 acres). It is situated in a savanna, containing over 100 woody plants and hundreds of herbaceous species. The facility includes a tree nursery, various ecological sites, a traditional medicine pharmacy, beekeeping installations, and an information centre. Gnanando Seydou is the Director.

An education project was initiated in 2006. Subsequent to the development of this pilot garden, the area's first protected zone, twenty protected lands were created by Development Network of Community Nature Reserves (Réseau de Développement de Réserves naturelles Communautaires; REDERC), an organization of the village community; REDERC received the Equator Prize 2010.
