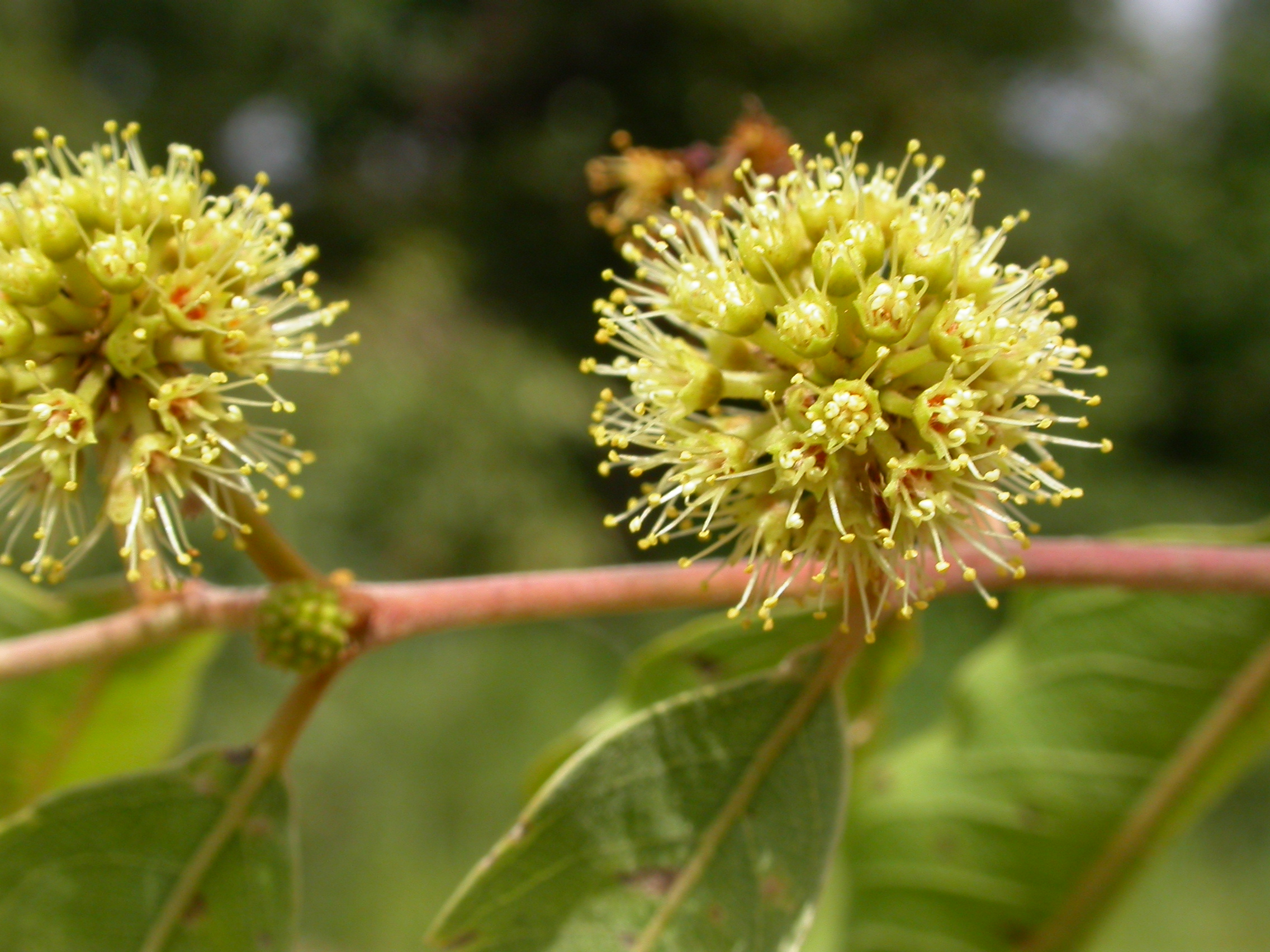
- Flowers in Burkina Faso

Conservation status
- Least Concern (IUCN 3.1)

Scientific classification
- Kingdom: Plantae
- Clade: Tracheophytes
- Clade: Angiosperms
- Clade: Eudicots
- Clade: Rosids
- Order: Myrtales
- Family: Combretaceae
- Genus: Terminalia
- Species: T. leiocarpa

Binomial name
- Terminalia leiocarpa (DC.) Baill. (1876)

Synonyms
- Anogeissus leiocarpa (DC.) Guill. & Perr. (1832); Anogeissus leiocarpa f. grandifolia Engl. & Diels (1899); Anogeissus leiocarpa f. parvifolia Hochst. ex Engl. & Diels (1899); Anogeissus leiocarpa var. schimperi (Hochst. ex Hutch. & Dalziel) Aubrév. (1950); Anogeissus schimperi Hochst. ex Hutch. & Dalziel (1927); Conocarpus leiocarpus DC. (1828); Conocarpus parvifolius Hochst. ex A.Rich. (1848); Conocarpus schimperi Hochst. ex A.Rich. (1848); Terminalia schimperi (Hochst. ex Hutch. & Dalziel) Gere & Boatwr. (2017)

= Terminalia leiocarpa =

Species of tree

Terminalia leiocarpa (African birch; Bambara: ngálǎma) is a species of tree in the family Combretaceae. It is a deciduous tree native of tropical Africa from Senegal and Guinea in the west to Eritrea in the east and as far south as the Democratic Republic of the Congo.

Terminalia leiocarpa germinates in the new soils produced by seasonal wetlands. It is a forest fringe plant, growing at the edges of the rainforest, although not deep in the rainforest. It also grows in savanna, and along riverbanks, where it forms gallery forests. The tree flowers in the rainy season, from June to October. The fruit are winged samaras, and are dispersed by ants.

== Ethnobotany ==
It is one of the plants used to make bògòlanfini, a traditional Malian mudcloth. Small branches with leaves are crushed to make one of the yellow dyes.

The inner bark of the tree is used as a human and livestock anthelmintic for treating worms, and for treatment of a few protozoan diseases in animals, nagana (an animal trypanosomiasis), and babesiosis.

The inner bark is used as a chewing stick in Nigeria and extracts of the bark show antibacterial properties. The stem barks contains castalagin and flavogallonic acid dilactone.

Laboratory investigation of the effects of aqueous stem bark extract of Anogeissus leiocarpus, which contains antioxidants, indicates that it provides dose-dependent benefits against gastric ulcers. The observed effectiveness is sufficient to support the ethno medicinal application of the plant in ulcer treatment and management.
