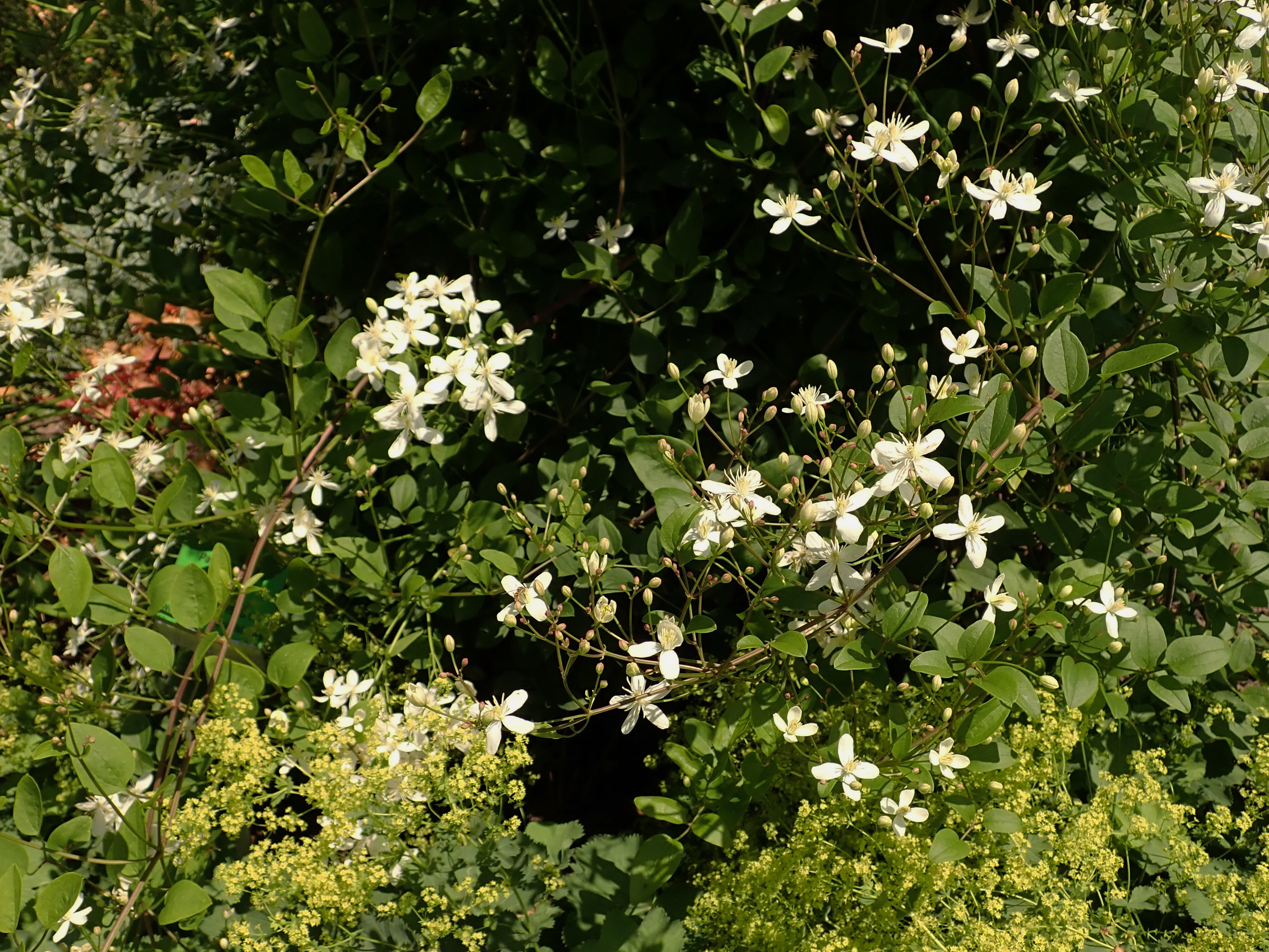

Scientific classification
- Kingdom: Plantae
- Clade: Tracheophytes
- Clade: Angiosperms
- Clade: Eudicots
- Order: Ranunculales
- Family: Ranunculaceae
- Genus: Clematis
- Species: C. terniflora
- Variety: C. t. var. mandshurica

Trinomial name
- Clematis terniflora var. mandshurica (Rupr.) Ohwi

Synonyms
- Clematis mandshurica Rupr.; Clematis recta var. mandshurica (Rupr.) Maxim.; Clematis liaotungensis Kitag.; Clematis mandshurica f. lancifolia Nakai; Clematis mandshurica var. lancifolia (Nakai) Nakai; Clematis mandshurica var. orientalis Maxim.; Clematis mandshurica f. pubescens Kostyrko & Gorl; Clematis papuligera Ohwi; Clematis recta var. koreana Nakai; Clematis terniflora var. koreana (Nakai) Tamura; Clematis terniflora f. koreana (Nakai) M.Kim

= Clematis terniflora var. mandshurica =

Species of flowering plant in the buttercup family

Clematis terniflora var. mandshurica is a variety of scrambling flowering plant in the buttercup family, Ranunculaceae, native to China, Russia, and the Koreas. Franz Josef Ruprecht first described it as Clematis mandshurica in 1857, but it has been considered a variety of Clematis terniflora following Jisaburo Ohwi's classification in 1938; this classification is disputed.

== Taxonomy ==
Franz Josef Ruprecht first described the plant in 1857, based on collections from the Amur River region by Richard Maack. Maack first observed it alongside the Onon River. Ruprecht considered it to be a full species, designating it Clematis mandshurica, and describing it by comparison with C. flammula and C. recta. In 1876, Karl Maximovich reclassified it as a variety of the latter species. Jisaburo Ohwi moved it to be a variety of Clematis terniflora in 1938. That year, two additional classifications were made, which now serve as synonyms: C. papuligera by Jisaburo Ohwi and C. liaotungensis by Masao Kitagawa.

The classification of this plant is still disputed. Plants of the World Online, published by the Royal Botanic Gardens, Kew, considers it to be a variety of C. terniflora. Flora of China agrees with this and separates it from the type variety by hairless or nearly hairless flower stalks, hairs only at the stem nodes, and smaller achenes, and from C. terniflora var. garanbiensis by its sharp-tipped anthers. Conversely, Hiroshi Hara considered all C. terniflora varieties insufficient for that rank, and collapsed them into synonyms in 1975. Christopher Grey-Wilson treated it as a distinct species in 2000, noting that it occurs farther north than C. terniflora. Publishing in the Korean Journal of Plant Taxonomy in 2022, Park et al. list it at the species rank, differentiating it from C. terniflora by raised veins on the undersides of its leaves and stems that die back in winter.

== Description ==
Clematis terniflora var. mandshurica is a deciduous and perennial plant that scrambles over other plants. In cultivation, it reaches 1 to 1.5 m (3.3 to 4.9 ft) tall and spreads 0.5 to 1 m (1.6 to 3.3 ft). The variety produces white flowers 20–30 mm (0.79–1.18 in) in diameter, typically with four sepals. The sepals are 11 to 17 mm (0.43 to 0.67 in) in length and 4 to 6 mm (0.16 to 0.24 in) in width. Its stems are smooth and hairless, except at the joints, where they bear fine hairs. The achenes are small, 4 to 6 mm (0.16 to 0.24 in) in length. An analysis of specimens from Korea found larger achenes, measuring 6.19 to 7.25 mm (0.24 to 0.29 in) by 3.02 to 4.43 mm (0.12 to 0.17 in); they are pale yellow and covered in fine hair.

Its leaves are pinnate. In the wider species C. terniflora, the leaf stem is 2.5 to 4.5 cm (0.98 to 1.77 in) long and the leaflets are 2.5 to 8 cm (0.98 to 3.15 in) long by 1 to 4.2 cm (0.39 to 1.65 in) wide. They typically have five leaflets, sometimes seven; these are chartaceous to subcoriaceous and have smooth edges.

== Distribution, habitat, and ecology ==
Clematis terniflora var. mandshurica is native to China, Russia, the Koreas, and Mongolia. It grows at 200–800 m (660–2,620 ft) elevation in hilly scrubland. In Russia, it is found in the Amur, Khabarovsk, and Primorye regions.

Two parasitic mites, Aculops jilinensis and Phyllocoptes terniflores, were described in 2016 after being identified on the plant. They were the first eriophyid mites discovered on it; they damage the leaves, causing them to blister and curl.

== Uses ==
In traditional Chinese medicine, the plant is one source of weilingxian (Clematidis Radix et Rhizome), alongside C. chinensis and C. hexapetala. Weilingxian has traditionally been used for joint pain and numbness.

Its root, combined with extracts from Prunella vulgaris and Trichosanthes kirilowii, is used to produce SKI306X, a botanical drug manufactured in Korea and sold as Joins. The Korea Food and Drug Administration has approved its use for osteoarthritis.

=== Cultivation ===
In the United Kingdom, the plant grows best in direct sunlight facing west or south, and takes two to five years to mature. The Royal Horticultural Society considers it hardy and best suited to free-draining soil. It bears leaves from spring through autumn and flowers in summer and autumn. The plant may irritate skin.
