= Recombinant Immunotoxin Collaborative Group =

The Recombinant Immunotoxin Collaborative Group (RICG) is a group of scientists specialising in immunology, biochemistry and molecular biology from the United Kingdom and Italy. The group is working toward the development of genetically engineered immunotoxins made from monoclonal antibody fragments genetically fused to either saporin or Pseudomonas exotoxin (PE) for the treatment of human hematological malignancies such as leukaemia, lymphoma and multiple myeloma.

== Formation ==
The RICG was formed in 2005 and originally consisted of Dr Aldo Ceriotti and Dr M. Serena Fabbrini (IBBA, CNR, Milan), Professor Marco Colombatti (University of Verona), Professor Rodolfo Ippoliti (University of L'Aquila), Dr Alessandro Pini (University of Siena) and Drs David Flavell and Sopsamorn Flavell (University of Southampton Medical School and Leukaemia Busters). Dr Alessandro Pini left the group in 2007.

== Achievements ==
The RICG was successful in producing a range of recombinant immunotoxins based on the monoclonal antibodies 4KB128 and OKT10 targeting CD22 and CD38, respectively on normal and malignant lymphoid cells. This development work was undertaken with funding from the UK-based charity Leukaemia Busters under the direction of Dr David Flavell, the charity's Scientific Director

== Disbanding ==
The group disbanded in 2009 due to funding difficulties following the global economic crisis but despite this the former members continue to collaborate in areas of mutual interest. In this respect some of the group members and their respective institutes have recently entered into a collaboration agreement with the Italian pharmaceutical company Dompé based in L’Aquila, central Italy with the intention of developing one of the RICG produced recombinant immunotoxins for investigation in early phase clinical trials for patients with leukaemia and lymphoma.
