= Toxalbumin =

Toxic plant proteins

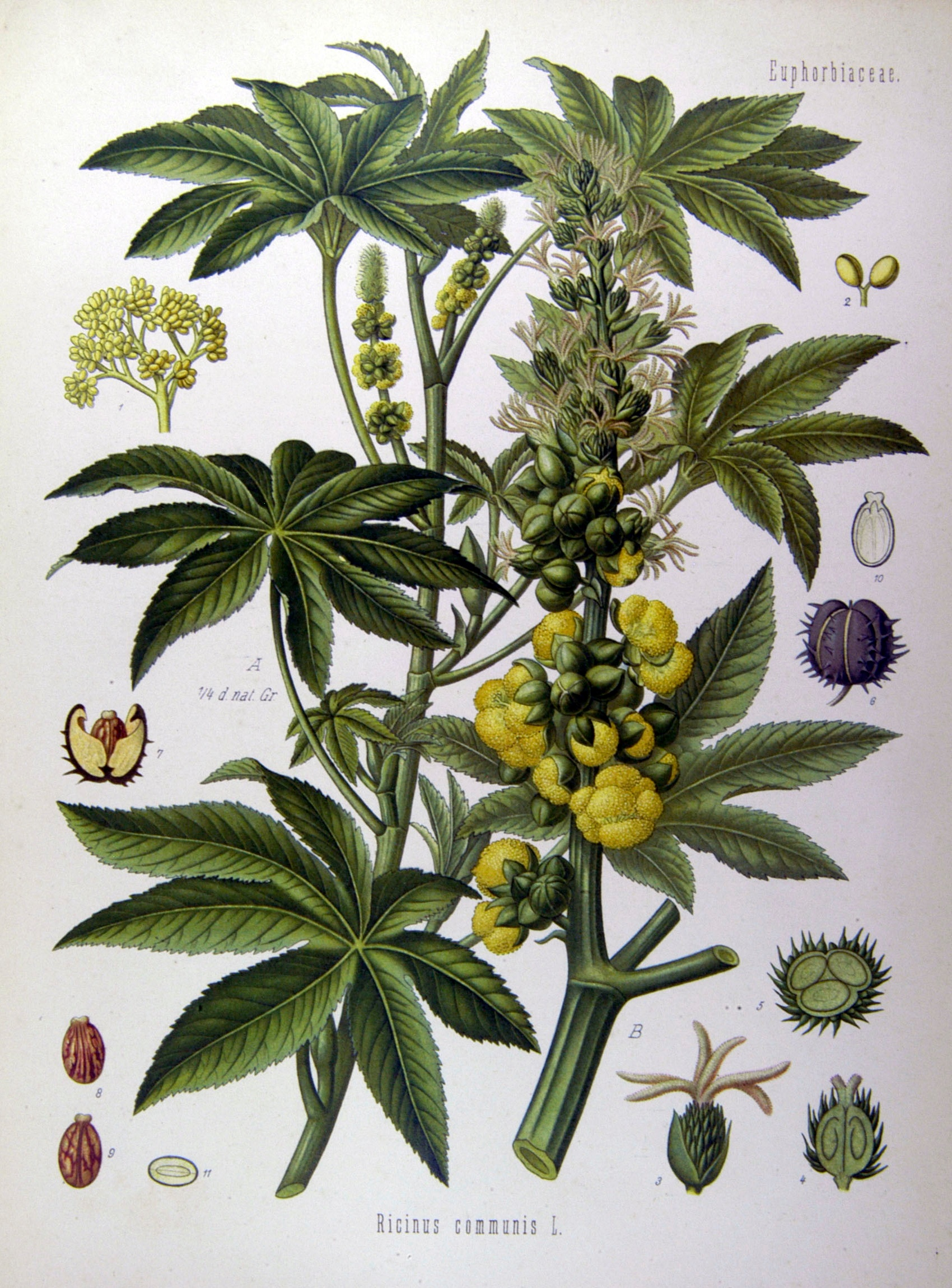
Ricinus communis

Toxalbumins are toxic plant proteins that disable ribosomes and thereby inhibit protein synthesis, producing severe cytotoxic effects in multiple organ systems. They are dimers held together by a disulfide bond and comprise a lectin (carbohydrate-binding protein) part which binds to the cell membrane and enables the toxin part to gain access to the cell contents. Toxalbumins are similar in structure to AB toxins found in cholera, tetanus, diphtheria, botulinum and others; and their physiological and toxic properties are similar to those of viperine snake venom.

== Description ==
Toxalbumins were first described in about 1890 by Ludwig Brieger (1849–1919) and Sigmund Fraenkel (1868–1939), associates of the organic chemist Eugen Baumann. Brieger first used the term toxin.

Toxalbumins notably are present in the plant families Leguminosae and Euphorbiaceae, occurring for instance in Robinia pseudoacacia, Abrus precatorius, Jatropha curcas, Croton gratissimus and Ricinus communis. Typical toxalbumins are abrin and ricin. Ingestion of seed containing toxalbumins is not necessarily fatal as the hard seed coat will withstand digestion, unless the seed has been pierced, as would happen in the making of necklaces, prayer beads or bracelets, and even then the toxalbumin is likely to be digested and thereby rendered harmless. Toxalbumins injected intravenously or subcutaneously or inhaled in powdered form, though, are highly toxic. A latent period of hours to days may follow with no sensible signs of distress, after which symptoms of nausea, vomiting and diarrhoea will appear, followed by delirium, seizures, coma, and death. From an evolutionary viewpoint, toxalbumins developed as a deterrent to consumption of seeds, foliage, bark and roots. Ripe fruits having a fleshy pulp are usually edible and lacking toxalbumins, encourage ingestion and the consequent distribution of seeds that have a coat sufficiently durable to survive a passage through the digestive system of a herbivore or fructivore.

Being soluble in water, ricin is not present in extracted oils. As with most proteins it breaks down after heat treatment, such as cooking or steaming, and after the oil is extracted, the resulting pomace is often used as animal feed. There is an enormous variation in sensitivity to the toxin, and a lethal dose may be as little as two-millionths of body weight. Since ricin is a protein, antibodies may be produced by inoculation, allowing resistance of up to 800 times a normal lethal dose. Ricin has been used in assassinations, a notorious case being the use of a 1.53 mm pellet holding a few hundred millionths of a gram of ricin to kill the Bulgarian broadcaster, Georgi Markov, who died 4 days after being attacked.

== Compared to amatoxins ==
The toxins present in poisonous mushrooms such as Amanita phalloides are quite different from toxalbumins and are mostly secondary metabolites or amatoxins which do not readily break down under applied heat. They are potent inhibitors of RNA polymerase II, an enzyme vital in the synthesis of messenger RNA (mRNA), microRNA, and small nuclear RNA (snRNA). Without mRNA, the template for protein synthesis, cell metabolism stops. In this respect, their metabolic effect is similar to that of toxalbumins.

== See also ==
- Lectin – Carbohydrate-binding protein
- Phytotoxin – Class of toxins found in plants
- Plant defense against herbivory – Evolutionary mechanism
- Ribosome-inactivating protein – Protein synthesis inhibitor
