= SKCPT =

SKCPT (SKI 306X) is a drug under development by SK Chemicals for the treatment of osteoarthritis. It is in a Phase III trial as of 2023.

It is a purified extract from a mixture plants (Clematis mandshurica, Trichosanthes kirilowii, and Prunella vulgaris) which are each used in herbal medicine.
