= Beetin =

Protein

Beetin (BE27 or BE29) is a ribosome-inactivating protein found in the leaves of sugar beets, Beta vulgaris L, specifically attacking plant ribosomes. Sugar beet, beetins, that have been isolated meet all the criteria to be classified as single chain (type 1) ribosome inactivating proteins that are highly toxic to mammalian ribosomes but non-toxic to intact cultured mammalian cells. Beetin expression occurs when there is a viral infection of the plant. The different levels of glycosylation of the same polypeptide chain result in the two forms of beetin (BE27 or BE29). Beetin exhibits these two primary forms with apparent Mr values of 27 000 (BE27) and 29 000 (BE29) along with possessing glycan chains. Beetins are a type-I (single-chain) proteins with N-glycoside activity. Since it has been discovered that beetin is mostly concentrated in the intercellular fluid, its presence in the remaining parts of the leaf may be below the limit of detection rather than being nonexistent. The expression of beetin is only found in mature plants, but is present in all developing stages.

== Structure ==
The beetin RIP exhibits the typical fold of type 1 RIPs and the A chain of type 2 RIPs, in which the intersection of three domains results in the active site. These domains are the N-terminal domain 1, which has β-strands and α-helices; domain 2, which has α-helices; and the C-terminal domain 3, which has two α-helices and two β-strands. BE27 displays a conformation of the loop lining the catalytic site cleft (from amino acids 84 to 122) but does not show a negatively charged patch near to the active site cleft.

== Role as antiviral protein ==
Beet 27 is also an antiviral protein that acts as a defense mechanism to protect the plant from a viral infection. This action can be induced by compounds like salicylic acid and hydrogen peroxide. Beet 27 does have the special ability of superoxide dismutase activity, being able to produce the compound, hydrogen peroxide.The hydrogen peroxide produced is toxic to attackers or it is also able to either directly or indirectly stimulate plant defense responses. The defensive ability has been directly linked to adenosine glycosidase activity from the RNA polynucleotide. Beetin levels are regulated post-transcriptionally during the growth of the plant Beta Vulgaris. Beetin's function as a defense protein has been related to its RNA polynucleotide: adenosine glycosidase activity on viral RNA since it depurinates the tobacco mosaic virus RNA whereas beet ribosomes are not sensitive to BE27. Beetin's topical antiviral action is compatible with the antiviral function now suggested for RIPs. The idea that beetin could cause the inactivation of the damaged cells' ribosomes and so prevent viral replication cannot be completely ruled out because the local lesion assay necessitates the abrasion of the leaf surface with carborundum. These biological abilities are of interest because they could potentially lead to a broad action treatment of several known pathogens. Studies are currently being done in vitro to understand the extent of this defense mechanism and the range of treatment types for infections from viruses, bacteria, fungi, and even insects.

== Role as antifungal protein ==
It is thought that Type 1 RIPs (found in the apoplasm) may be a component of certain higher plants' general suicide strategy since they render injured tissue ineffective for the establishment of a viral or parasitic fungal infection. Beetin has been found as a defense protein reacting to viral infections, but it has also been tested to see if beetin have antifungal properties. On both bacterial and fungal ribosomes, BE27 exhibits rRNA N-glycosidase activity. The carboxy-terminal amino acid sequence of defensins, which is distinguished by the presence of two antiparallel -strands with an interposed loop and is preceded by a -helix, has been reported to be a primary determinant of the antifungal activity of defensins. BE27 was able to enter the cytosol and kill fungal cells at quantities lower than those observed in the apoplast, halting the growth of the fungus. The activity of rRNA N-glycosylase on the SRL of the large-subunit rRNA, which irreversibly deactivates the fungal ribosomes and prevents protein synthesis, appeared to be the mechanism of action. Researchers discovered that when a smear of damaged DNA was seen in fungus that had been exposed to BE27 compared to the untreated control, no internucleosomal cleavage was apparent, indicating that BE27 intoxication can happen through non-apoptotic pathways. Cultures have shown that they did not exhibit internucleosomal cleavage after exposure to BE27, indicating that ribosome inactivation followed by necrotic cell death is the mechanism by which fungal growth is inhibited.

== Research findings ==
Beetin production has two different mechanisms of regulation including the control of translation and the control of transcription which coexist. When Beetin was sequenced it was found that this type of ribosome inactivating protein has a single peptide. In a study done with analyzing N-terminal amino acid sequences, both BE27 and BE29 have shown to be closely related due to both proteins having the sequence H2N-ADVTFDLETASKTKYGTFLSNLRNI.... BE29 is more glycosylated than BE27, as BE27 is a non-glycosylated form of Beetin.

Beetin 27 (BE27) has anti-pathogenic properties that are activated when exposed to hydrogen peroxide and salicylic acid. Beetin RIPs are 28S ribosomal RNA N-glycosylases that cleave a bond between adenine 4324 and its ribosome in the 60S subunit of ribosome. This adenine is located in the Sarcin Ricin Loop which is most important for anchoring the EFG or EF-2 elongation factors on the ribosome during mRNA transfer. BE27 activity shows that as a rRNA N-glycosidase splits an adenine from the Sarcin Ricin Loop from the mammalian 28S rRNA which disables the ribosomes from binding the Elongation Factor 2 and arresting protein synthesis. Along with rRNA glycosidase activity, there was some endonuclease activity based on the relationship between BE27 and the plasmid PUC19. It was found that BE27 promoted the change of supercoiled PUC19 DNA to a more relaxed, linear form. In the three arbitrary stages of growth, beetin RNA transcripts of beetin were shown to be constitutively produced at high quantities by Northern blot studies, but they were not translated in germ plants or 2-week-old plants. Additionally, it was discovered that the hydrogen peroxide-induced induction of beetin seemed to occur only in plantlets that were 4 weeks old, showing that the elicitor-dependent production of beetin is developmentally controlled. As more mediators like salicylic acid or hydrogen peroxide are added as treatment to the sugar beet plants the more expression of beetin is shown. Beetin may only be present in mature plants, but it was found that the induction of the beetin with hydrogen peroxide or artichoke mottled crinkle virus (AMCV) has shown beetin expression in both new and old leaves with around the same intensity of expression. Expression studies have shown that beetin is highly effective against E. coli ribosomes because they become depurinated as the bacteria develops and beetin in created and accumulates inside the cells.

== See also ==
- Saporin
- Trichosanthin
