= Simon Flavell Leukaemia Research Laboratory =

Laboratory in Southampton, England

Coordinates: 50°54′47.65″N 1°24′16.26″W

The Simon Flavell Leukaemia Research Laboratory is based at Southampton General Hospital and named after ten-year-old Simon Flavell who died in 1990 from an aggressive form of T-cell acute lymphoblastic leukemia (ALL). The laboratory specialises in researching and developing antibody type treatments for adults and children with currently incurable types of leukaemia.

The laboratory was opened officially on 21 February 1993 by Gary Lineker and his former wife Michelle and in 2008 underwent a complete refurbishment. Originally part of the University of Southampton Medical School, The Simon Flavell Laboratory became independent in 2005 though still affiliated to the School of Medicine but now funded by the children’s leukaemia research charity Leukaemia Busters and other charitable sources.

The Simon Flavell laboratory focuses on translational research designed to bring benefits to patients directly. In the early years the laboratory was involved in the development and manufacture of two different immunotoxins for treating patients with lymphoma, acute lymphoblastic leukaemia (ALL) and multiple myeloma in phase I clinical trials. This continues and now the laboratory is involved in developing the next generation of genetically engineered immunotoxins that should prove safer to use and cheaper to manufacture. A main theme of the laboratory’s current research work is to devise ways of improving the therapeutic window for immunotoxins to make them safer and more effective to use clinically.

The laboratory is currently headed by Simon’s parents David Flavell and Sopsamorn (Bee) Flavell .

The purpose of this Laboratory is to ensure that patients do not have to experience as much chemotherapy. The reason why this laboratory even opened was to support Simon Flavell and other people who have high potential for Leukemia, to make sure they would not have to experience as much pain.
