= Avadhesha Surolia =

Indian glycobiologist

- Born: 3 December 1947 (age 78); Kishangarh, Rajasthan
- Education: University of Jodhpur (B.Sc.), Maharaja Sayajirao University of Baroda (M.Sc.), Madras University (Ph.D., D.Sc.)
- Known for: Lectin structure and interactions, protein folding, diabetes research, antimalarials, anti-cancer agents
- Awards: Bhatnagar Fellowship, Honorary D.Sc. from Queen's University, Belfast
- Scientific career
- Fields: Glycobiology, Biochemistry
- Workplaces: Indian Institute of Science, Bangalore
- Doctoral advisor: Bimal Kumar Bachhawat

Avadhesha Surolia (born 3 December 1947) is a glycobiologist at the Indian Institute of Science (IISc), Bangalore. He was born in Kishangarh, Rajasthan, India. Presently, he is an honorary professor at the Molecular Biophysics Unit, IISc and holds the Bhatnagar fellowship of the Council of Scientific and Industrial Research (CSIR). He is known for his work on lectin structure and interactions, orientation and dynamics of cell surface carbohydrate receptors and protein folding, diabetes, antimalarials and anti-cancer agents based on curcumin, flavonoids, etc. In addition, neuropathic pain, neurodegenerative disorders and the link between immunity and obsessive–compulsive disorder are areas of his current interest

== Education and career ==
Surolia obtained his bachelor's degree in chemistry and biology from the University of Jodhpur in 1970. He earned his master's degree in biochemistry from Maharaja Sayajirao University of Baroda in 1972. He completed his Ph.D. under the guidance of B. K. Bachhawat from Madras University in 1976. In 1978, he was awarded a Doctor of Science degree by Madras University. After his doctoral studies he joined Indian Institute of Chemical Biology (IICB), Calcutta, as a scientist in 1977 until 1981. He further held the position of assistant professor at IICB until 1986, after which he joined Molecular Biophysics Unit (MBU) at IISc as an associate professor (1986–1991). He was a professor at MBU, IISc from 1991 to 2013 and served as its chairman from 2000 to 2006. From 2006 to 2011 he held the directorship of India's prestigious research institute, National Institute of Immunology (NII), New Delhi. During his tenure NII was recognized by Thomson Reuters Innovation Award in 2010 as the most innovative research institute nationally. He holds honorary professorship at Jawaharlal Nehru Centre for Advanced Scientific Research, Bangalore. In recognition of his contributions to medicine and science, he was conferred an Honorary D.Sc. degree in 2013 by Queen's University, Belfast, UK.

== Scientific contributions ==
Surolia has elucidated the role of glycosphingolipids as biological receptors through studies on lectin-glycolipid interactions using liposomes. He discovered novel blood group and tumor antigen specific lectins and made original contribution towards elucidation of the energetics and mechanism of protein-sugar recognition. He genetically re-engineered carbohydrate specificities of lectins imparting T-antigen tumor recognizing ability to peanut agglutinin. He delineated the molecular basis of carbohydrate recognition by legume lectins and demonstrated the novel C-H...O/N hydrogen bond in protein-sugar interactions. He studied thermal unfolding of lectins that led to the discovery of novel modes of oligomerization in them. He found a molten globule monomeric intermediate during the folding of peanut agglutinin that retained its carbohydrate binding ability - establishing 'wet' molten globule as an "on pathway" folding intermediate and characterized other early intermediates. His studies showed that the monomers of legume lectins have the necessary structural features for carbohydrate recognition and that oligomerization imparts them with topology necessary for their biologic activities such as agglutination, mitogenesis, etc. He elucidated the molecular features of substrate recognition by endoplasmic reticulum chaperones calreticulin and calnexin. He discovered the unusual quaternary structure of peanut agglutinin and a novel lectin fold in Jacalin as well as the structural basis of inactivation of ribosomes by gelonin. He enunciated that solvent reorganization in protein-ligand interactions modulates their specificities. He showed the existence of co-operativity in lectin-multimeric sugar interactions. Surolia explained the enigmatic endotoxin neutralizing activity of polymyxin B to its specific ability to remove endotoxin from its assembly and attributed it to its unique amphiphilicity. He popularized Protein A as a tool in immunology. He discovered the broad substrate specificity of a key enzyme of biotin biosynthesis from M. tuberculosis and reported novel inhibitors for it. He has demonstrated the potential of common dietary components - curcumin and green tea catechins as anti-cancer and antimalarial agents. He has developed a rhodanine, BCFMT, as a potential therapeutic for cancer. Surolia co-discovered the existence of the fatty acid synthesis pathway in Plasmodium and demonstrated its remarkable distinction from that of its human host. He co-identified triclosan, a widely used biocide, to compromise the growth of the parasite by inhibiting its enoyl-ACP reductase (FabI). Recently, Surolia and colleagues have identified pranlukast (a US Food and Drug Administration approved drug for asthma) as novel inhibitor of Mtb ArgJ, an enzyme of the arginine biosynthesis pathway, essential for pathogenicity and survival in host cells. Pranlukast demonstrated remarkable efficiency in pre-clinical models of Mycobacterium Tuberculosis. These apart, Surolia has also ventured into the field of chronic disease biology where he has developed a novel form of insulin, Supramolecular Insulin Assembly-II (SIA-II), for long-lasting treatment of type I diabetes mellitus. In addition to protein–sugar interactions his research is also focused on neuropathic pain, neurodegenerative disorders and the link between immunity and obsessive–compulsive disorder. Curcumin and its designed analogs are being developed as experimental therapeutics for these diseases and cancer. His findings have been commercially exploited by a number of international companies such as Amersham-Pharmacia, Sigma Chemical Co., Pierce Corporation, Bangalore Genei, Datascope Corp., and Shantha Biotechniques Pvt. Ltd. He has about 19 national and international patents. Surolia has published about 360 scientific papers in peer-reviewed journals of high impact factor. He has an h-index of 41 and his publications have been cited over 5000 times.

== Fellowships and memberships ==
Surolia is a member of: Third World Academy of Sciences (TWAS), Trieste, Italy and International Molecular Biologists Network. He is a fellow of all the science academies in the country- National Science Academy, Indian National Science Academy and Indian Academy of Sciences. He was a member of the Board of Trustees, Human Frontier Scientific Programme (HFSP, Strasbourg). He is the only Indian member of the International Glycoconjugate Organization since 1998 and served as its president from 2001 to 2004. He has been a visiting scientist at Massachusetts Institute of Technology, University of Maryland and University of Michigan, USA. He has chaired a number of Study sections of Department of Biotechnology, Department of Science and Technology and CSIR (India) and continues to advise a number of Institutions and Academic bodies in India and abroad. He is currently Bhatnagar Fellow of CSIR (India), was a JC Bose Fellow of DST (India), Honorary Professor, Indian Institute of Science, and member executive committee of the International Union of Biochemistry and Molecular Biology (IUBMB). He is in the editorial advisory board of IUBMB-Life and PLoS ONE. He has served as an editor of the Proceedings of the Indian National Science Academy from 1998 to 2001. He is an editorial board member of the Proceedings of the National Academy of Sciences (India) and the Indian Journal of Biotechnology.

== Awards ==
Jawaharlal Nehru Birth Centenary Lecture (2008)., B.K. Bachhawat Memorial Award 2007, J.C.Bose Fellowship (2006), Dr. B.R. Ambedkar Centenary Award for Excellence in Biomedical Research (2003), Goyal Prize in the area of Life Sciences (2002), TWAS Prize in Biology (2001), Professor GN Ramachandran 60th Birthday Commemoration Medal (2000), Alumni Award (IISc, 1999), Ranbaxy Science Foundation Award in Basic Medical Sciences (1995), Shri Om Prakhash Bhasin Award for Biotechnology (1993), FICCI award for outstanding research in Biological Sciences (1993), W.H. Stillmark Prize (Honorary) for outstanding research contributions on lectins (1990), S.S. Bhatnagar Award for Outstanding Research in Biological Sciences (1987), INSA Young Scientist Medal (1976)
