= RRNA N-glycosylase =

rRNA N-glycosylase
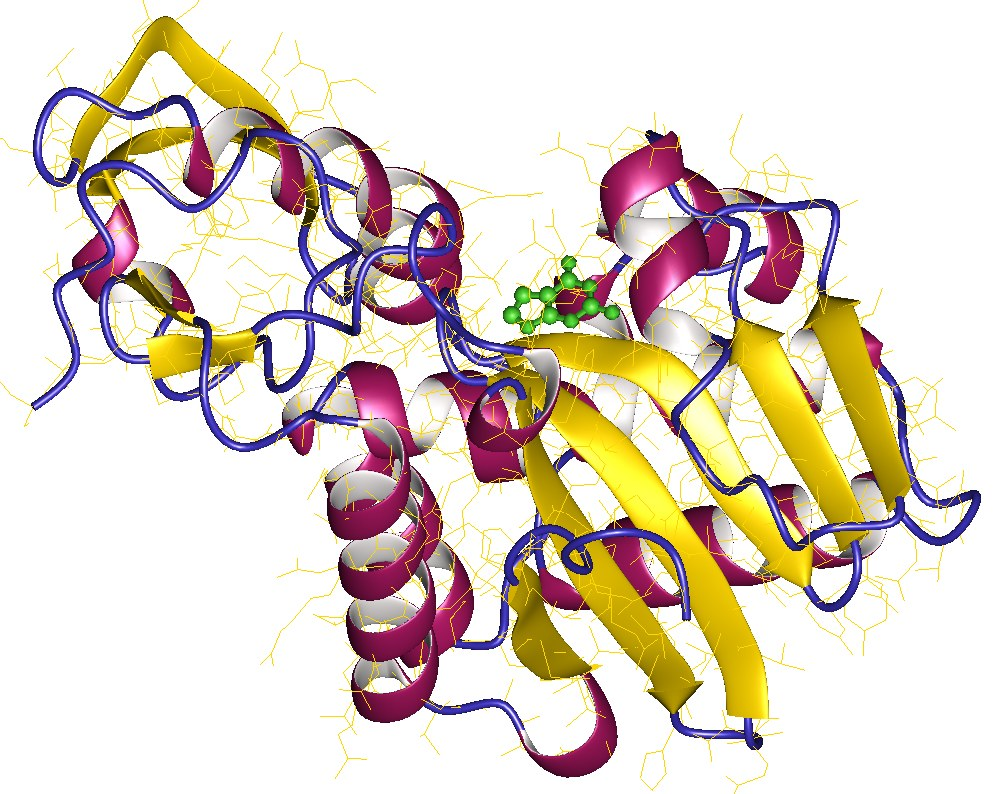
- Ricin A chain, Ricinus communis

Identifiers
- EC no.: 3.2.2.22
- CAS no.: 113756-12-0

Databases
- IntEnz: IntEnz view
- BRENDA: BRENDA entry
- ExPASy: NiceZyme view
- KEGG: KEGG entry
- MetaCyc: metabolic pathway
- PRIAM: profile
- PDB structures: RCSB PDB PDBe PDBsum
Search
- PMC: articles
- PubMed: articles
- NCBI: proteins

rRNA N-glycosylase (EC 3.2.2.22, ribosomal ribonucleate N-glycosidase, nigrin b, RNA N-glycosidase, rRNA N-glycosidase, ricin, momorcochin-S, Mirabilis antiviral protein, gelonin, saporins) is an enzyme with systematic name rRNA N-glycohydrolase. This enzyme catalyses the following chemical reaction

Hydrolysis of the N-glycosylic bond at A-4324 in 28S rRNA from eukaryotic ribosomes.

Ricin A-chain and related toxins show this activity. The only protein family known to have this activity is the ribosome-inactivating protein (RIP) family.
