= Saporin =

Highly toxic ribosome inactivating protein

Saporin /ˈsæpərɪn/ is a protein that is useful in biological research applications, especially studies of behavior. Saporins are so-called ribosome inactivating proteins (RIPs), due to its N-glycosidase activity, from the seeds of Saponaria officinalis (common name: soapwort). It was first described by Fiorenzo Stirpe and his colleagues in 1983 in an article that illustrated the unusual stability of the protein.

Among the RIPs are some of the most toxic molecules known, such as ricin and abrin. Each of these toxins contain a second protein subunit, which inserts the RIP into a cell, enabling it to enzymatically inactivate the ribosomes, shutting down protein synthesis, stopping basic cell functions, resulting in cell death, and eventually causing death of the victim. Saporin has no chain capable of inserting it into the cell. Thus it and the soapwort plant are safe to handle. This has aided its use in research.

If given a method of entry into the cell, saporin becomes a very potent toxin, since its enzymatic activity is among the highest of all RIPs. The enzymatic activity of RIPs is unusually specific: a single adenine base is removed from the ribosomal RNA of the large subunit of the ribosome. This is the Achilles’ heel of the ribosome; the removal of this base completely inhibits the ability of that ribosome to participate in protein synthesis. The fungal toxin alpha-sarcin cuts the ribosomal RNA at the adjacent base, also causing protein synthesis inhibition.

The conversion of saporin into a toxin has been used to create a series of research molecules. Attachment of saporin to something that enters the cell will convert it into a toxin for that cell. If the agent is specific for a single cell type, by being an antibody specific for some molecule that is only presented on the surface of the target cell type, then a set group of cells can be removed. This has many applications, some more successful than others. Saporin is not the only molecule that is used in this way; the enzymatic chain of ricin, the RIP gelonin, the enzymatic chain of Pseudomonas exotoxin, the enzymatic chain of diphtheria toxin have also been used, again with variations in success.

Immunotoxins consisting of a monoclonal antibody linked to saporin have been developed and evaluated in formal clinical trials in patients with leukaemia and lymphoma in the UK and Germany. One disadvantage of these types of immunotoxin for clinical use is their relatively narrow therapeutic window and associated potentially life-threatening toxicities at dose levels that are therapeutic. During the past 15 years the research group of Dr David Flavell at Southampton General Hospital in the UK have been investigating various ways of improving the potency and widening the therapeutic window for saporin-based immunotoxins thereby opening up new possibilities for this class of drug. Most recently saponins (not to be confused with saporin) from Gypsophila paniculata have been shown to significantly augment saporin-based immunotoxins directed against human cancer cells by several orders of magnitude.

In the last 15 years, in research begun by R. G. Wiley of Vanderbilt University, saporin has been used mainly to target specific neuronal populations in lab animals and eliminate them. This allows the researcher to observe the behavioral changes and associate them with the neuronal populations that were eliminated. For instance, the elimination of the cholinergic neurons of the rat basal forebrain by the toxin created by attaching saporin to an antibody that attaches to, and then internalizes into, only these neurons has created a mimic for the crucial result of Alzheimer's disease in humans. In this way, collateral results of the progression of the disease or drugs for the intervention can be studied. More than 300 scientific articles have been published utilizing saporin for study of the nervous systems, and more than 15 specific toxins have been created.

Saporin’s success is probably due to its stability. Santanche et al. have evaluated the physical characteristics of the protein and conclude “the remarkable resistance of saporin to denaturation and proteolysis suggests this protein as an ideal candidate for biotechnological applications”.
