= Trichosanthin =

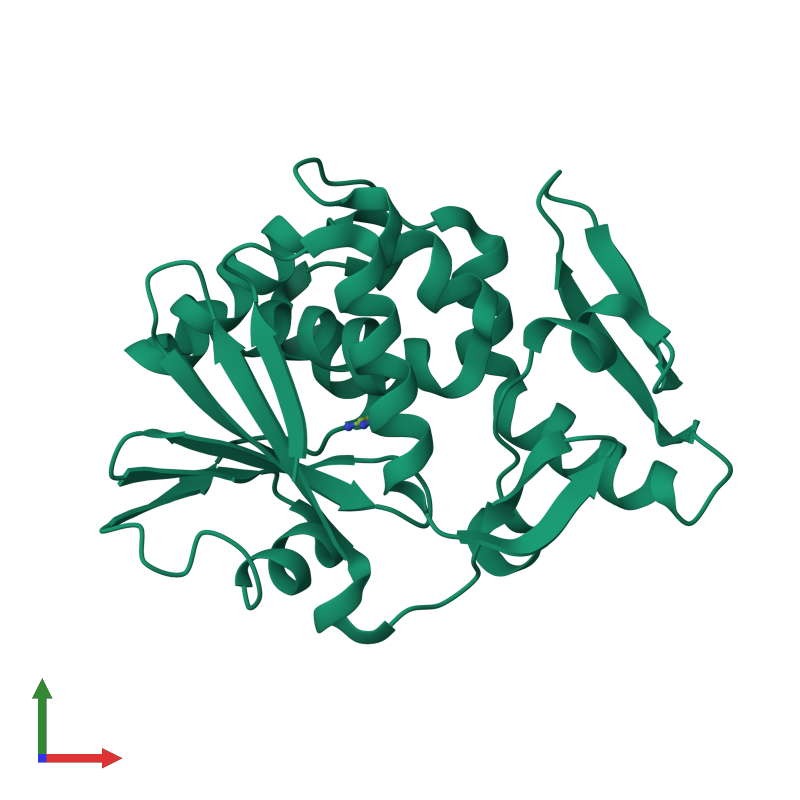

Identifiers
- Symbol: ?
- Alt. names: α-Trichosanthin
- CAS number: 60318-52-7
- UniProt: P09989
Search for
- Structures: Swiss-model
- Domains: InterPro

Trichosanthin is a ribosome-inactivating protein. It is derived from Trichosanthes kirilowii. It is also an abortifacient.
