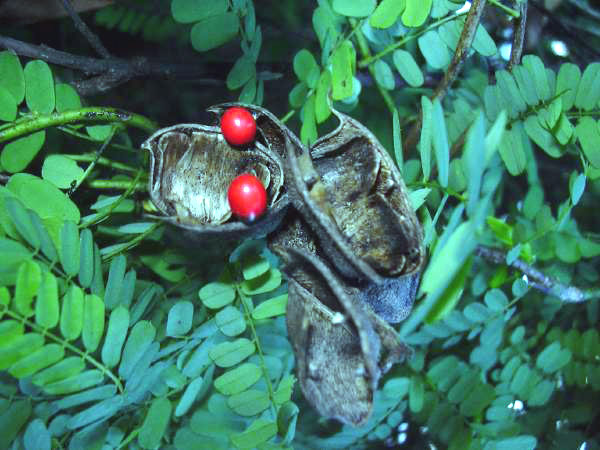

Scientific classification
- Kingdom: Plantae
- Clade: Tracheophytes
- Clade: Angiosperms
- Clade: Eudicots
- Clade: Rosids
- Order: Fabales
- Family: Fabaceae
- Subfamily: Faboideae
- Genus: Abrus
- Species: A. precatorius

Binomial name
- Abrus precatorius L.
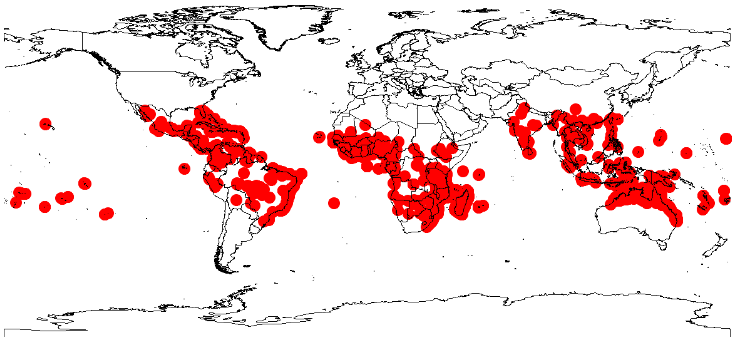
- Occurrence data from GBIF

Synonyms
- Abrus maculatus Noronha; Abrus pauciflorus Desv.; Glycine abrus L.; Orobus americanus Mill.; Zaga latifolia Raf.; Zaga parvifolia Raf.

= Abrus precatorius =

Species of flowering plant in the bean family

Abrus precatorius, commonly known as jequirity bean or rosary pea, is a herbaceous flowering plant in the bean family Fabaceae. It is a slender, perennial climber with long, pinnate-leafleted leaves that twines around trees, shrubs, and hedges.

The plant is best known for its seeds, which are used as beads and in percussion instruments, and which are toxic because of the presence of abrin. Ingestion of a single seed, well chewed, can be fatal to both adults and children. The plant is native to Asia and Australia. It has a tendency to become weedy and invasive where it has been introduced.

== Names ==
Abrus precatorius is commonly known as jequirity, Crab's eye, or rosary pea, paternoster pea, love pea, precatory pea or bean, prayer bead, John Crow Bead, coral bead, red-bead vine, country licorice, Indian licorice, wild licorice, Jamaica wild licorice, olinda (In Sri Lanka/Sinhala), gulaganji (in Kannada), kundumani (in Tamil), coondrimany, gidee gidee, Jumbie bead, ratti (in Hindi) / rettee / retty, or weather plant. Gunja (in Marathi)

In Africa, Abrus precatorius is known as ojuologbo (Yoruba), oto-berebere (Igbo), idonzakara (Hausa) and nneminua (Ib) in southwestern Nigeria and obirekuaiura in Ghana.

== Ecology and invasiveness ==
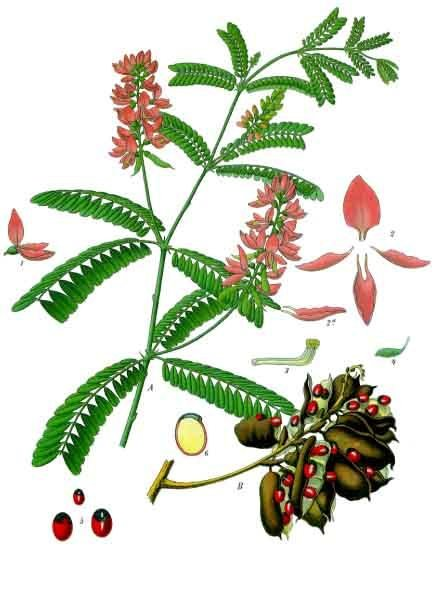
From Koehler's Medicinal-Plants

Abrus precatorius is a severely invasive plant in warm temperate to tropical regions, so much so that it has become effectively pantropical in distribution. It had been widely introduced by humans, and the brightly coloured and hard-shelled seeds had been spread by birds. By the end of the twentieth century, it had been proclaimed as an invasive weed in many regions including some in Belize, Caribbean Islands, Hawaii, Polynesia and parts of the mainland United States. In Florida in particular, the plant has invaded undisturbed pinelands and hammocks, including the vulnerable pine rocklands.

Once Abrus precatorius plants have grown to maturity under favourable conditions, their deep roots are extremely difficult to remove, and the plants' aggressive growth, hard-shelled seeds, and ability to sucker, renders an infestation extremely difficult to eradicate and makes it very difficult to prevent re-infestation. Herbicides such as glyphosate are effective, but need skilled application if they are not to do more harm than good.

== Toxin ==
The toxin abrin is a dimer consisting of two protein subunits, termed A and B. The B chain facilitates abrin's entry into a cell by bonding to certain transport proteins on cell membranes, which then transport the toxin into the cell. Once inside the cell, the A chain prevents protein synthesis by inactivating the 28S RNA of the ribosome. One molecule of abrin will inactivate up to 1,500 ribosomes per second.

Symptoms are identical to those of ricin, except abrin is more toxic by almost two orders of magnitude; the fatal dose of abrin is approximately 1/75 that of the fatal dose of ricin (though the abrin in ingested seeds may be absorbed much more slowly than the ricin in Ricinus communis even if the seeds are chewed and the coat penetrated, allowing time for successful rescue efforts in at least some cases.) Abrin has an LD_{50} of only 0.56 μg/kg in mice, and Kingsbury lists a toxic dose in humans at 0.00015% body weight, or approximately 0.1 mg for a 68 kg (150 lb) human. Ingesting intact seeds may result in no clinical findings, as they can pass undigested through the gastrointestinal tract because of their hard shell.

This plant is also poisonous to horses.

Symptoms of poisoning include nausea, vomiting, convulsions, liver failure, and death, usually after several days.

== Uses ==
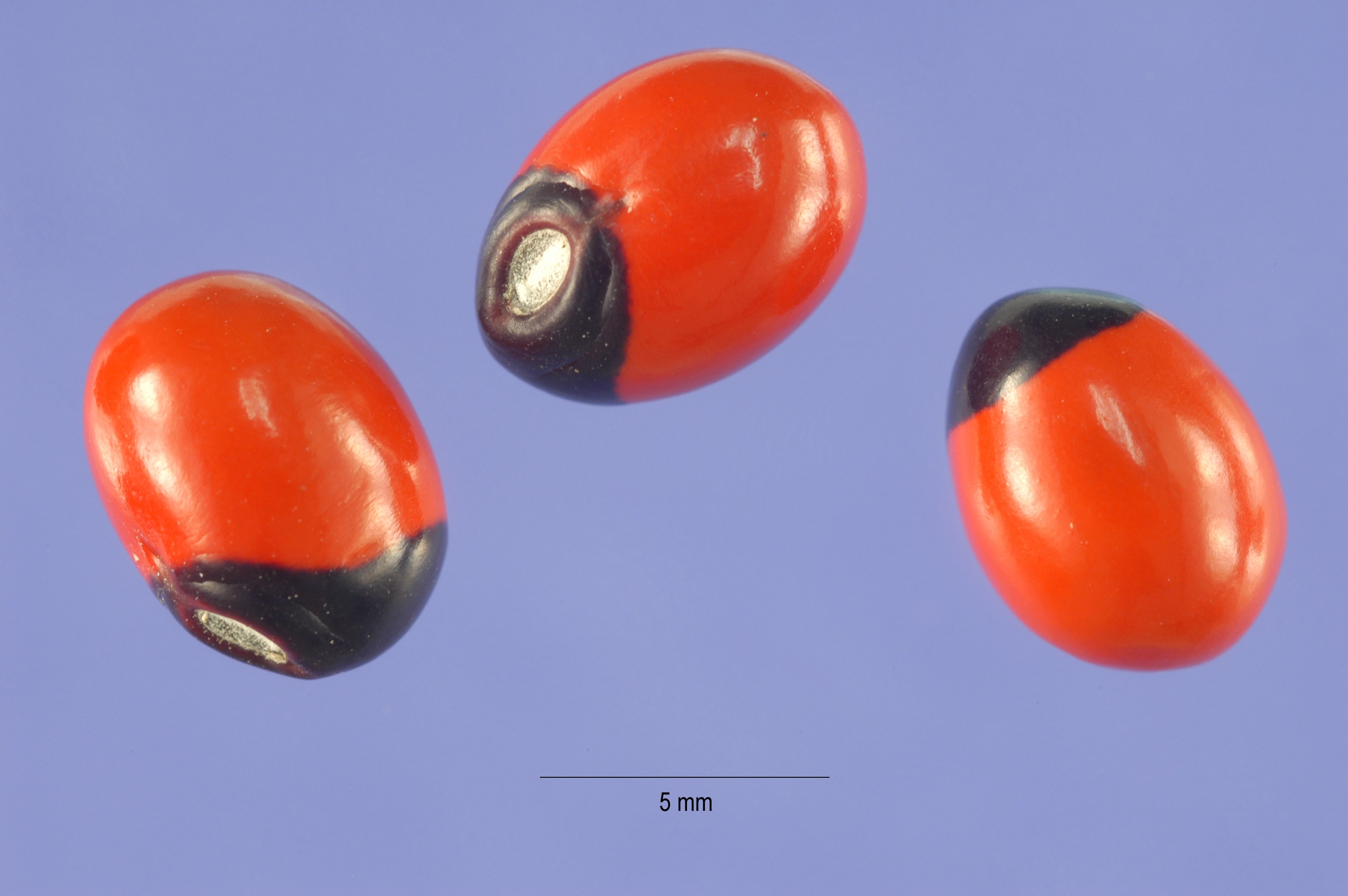
The bright red seeds of A. precatorius are strung as jewelry.

=== Jewelry ===
The seeds of Abrus precatorius are much valued in native jewelry for their bright coloration. Most beans are black and red, reminiscent of a ladybug, though other colors exist. Jewelry-making with jequirity seeds is rumored to be somewhat hazardous. There are persistent reports that the workers who pierce the seeds in order to thread them can suffer poisoning or even death from a pinprick, but there seems to be little evidence. An online search found 265 scientific papers referring to Abrus precatorius, but not one of them dealt with occupational poisoning.

In Trinidad in the West Indies the brightly colored seeds are strung into bracelets and worn around the wrist or ankle to ward off jumbies or evil spirits and "mal-yeux"—the evil eye. The Tamils use Abrus seeds of different colors. The red variety with black eye is the most common, but there are black, white and green varieties as well.

In December 2011 a recall was issued for bracelets made using jequirity beans sold by the Eden Project and other outlets in the UK.

=== Unit of measure ===
The seeds of Abrus precatorius are very consistent in weight, even under different moisture conditions due to the water-impermeable seed-coat. Formerly Indians used these seeds to weigh gold using a measure called a Ratti, where 8 Ratti = 1 Masha; 12 Masha = 1 Tola (11.6 Grams).

=== As a weapon ===
According to the 1898 King's American Dispensatory,

Abrus seeds are the agents by which the Chamàr or "Native Skinner" caste of India carry on the felonious poisoning of cattle for the purpose of securing their hides. This is done by means of small spikes, called sui (needles) or sutari (awls), which are prepared by soaking the awl in a thin paste of the water-soaked, pounded seeds, and then drying the weapon in the sun, after which it is oiled and sharpened upon stone, affixed in a handle, and then used to puncture the skin of the animal.

An 1881 work by the District Superintendent of Police for British-occupied Bengal details the preparation and use of the sutari for the killing of cattle and in at least six murder cases. A native, promised a reduced sentence for the poisoning of a fellow villager's bullock in exchange for his testimony, demonstrated the technique. First the outer shells of red or white seeds were cracked between stones, then the two cotyledons from within thirty or forty seeds were soaked in water for ten minutes. These seeds were ground to a paste and rolled up into six sharp-ended one-inch cones, which were inserted into either end of three pieces of straw and "exposed to the moderate influence of the sun" to dry, whereupon they regained some of the original hardness of the seed. In this account, the sutaries were described as being these cones, entirely made up of the hardened seed paste. The dried cones were checked for sharpness, and if need be, whetted with a brick and re-set. Finally, to prevent softening, they were waterproofed by "burying them for a night in some sort of animal grease." For testing, which Major Ramsay asked to be done exactly like a surreptitious killing, the prisoner set two sutaries into a 1.5-inch wooden handle meant to be held in the hand by pressing them into a rag stretched over sockets in the wood. A wandering "Brahmanee bull" was procured, and the prisoner brought the sutari down in one direction and away in the other, so as to break off the cones inside the animal's flesh behind the horn, then pressed the skin over the broken ends leaving no obvious trace of the injury. This process was repeated with two more cones to the base of the animal's tongue. The bull died after 34.5 hours, leaving no visible trace of the sutaries but a small amount of pus at the wound site, whose swelling had mostly subsided by the time of death.

The 1890 Pharmacographia Indica gives an account, based in part on the above work, describing the sutaris or suis (the terms being equivalent, depending on district, with the former based on the object's resemblance to the point of a cobbler's awl). It describes the sutaris as 3/4 inch long and weighing 1.5 to 2 grains, varying in color from dirty white to black, and describes the handle as 3 to 3.5 inches long and frequently made from two joints of bamboo wood, with sockets 1/4 to 3/8 inch deep and with the cavity exposed at one end for storage of additional sutaris. The weapons were sometimes made with the milky juice of Calotropis gigantea instead of water, which was said to speed the effect, and were sometimes supplemented with metallic mercury, dhatura, aconite, and/or arsenic. It is added that "any attempt to withdraw the sutari by pulling at the pieces sticking out, invariably breaks it, a portion being left in the wound." One man murdered by a single blow with a pair of sutaris died after three days; another, from whom the material had been successfully excised, died three days later of tetanus. The price of one of these killings was said to total 16.5 rupees; the killers were punished by transportation for life.

=== In traditional medicine ===
Abrus precatorius, called Gulaganji in Kannada, kundu mani in Tamil, Guruvinda ginja in Telugu and Kunni kuru in Malayalam, has been used in Siddha medicine for centuries. The white variety is used to prepare oil that is claimed to be an aphrodisiac. A tea is made from the leaves and used for fevers, coughs and colds. Seeds are poisonous and therefore are only consumed after heat treatment. The Tamil Siddhars knew about the toxic effects in plants and suggested various methods which is called "suththi seythal" or purification. This is done by boiling the seeds in milk and then drying them. Like with castor oil, the protein toxin is denatured when subjected to high temperatures rendering it innocuous.

The 1889 book 'The Useful Native Plants of Australia' records that "The roots of this plant are used in India as a substitute for liquorice, though they are somewhat bitter. In Java the roots are considered demulcent. The leaves, when mixed with honey, are applied to swellings, and in Jamaica are used as a substitute for tea. Under the name of "Jequirity" the seeds have recently been employed in cases of ophthalmia, a use to which they have long been put in India and Brazil."

The plant is also used in Ayurveda and is said to promote hair growth. It is sometimes used as an ingredient in Indian hair products.

The leaves of Abrus precatorius are used by the indigenous communities of the Western region of Ghana as an anti-diabetic medicine.

== Laboratory study of extracts ==
A variety of pharmacological effects have been observed in rodents, but have not been demonstrated clinically in humans, including:

- An ethanolic extract of Abrus precatorius was found to have antioxidant, anti-inflammatory and analgesic potential in rodents.
- A methanolic extract of A. precatorius seeds causes reversible alterations in the estrous cycle pattern and completely blocked ovulation in Sprague-Dawley rats.
- Studies on aqueous, methanolic and chloroform extracts of Abrus precatorius showed greater inhibitory activity against a number of disease-causing bacteria such as Bacillus subtilis, Pseudomonas aeruginosa, Staphylococcus aureus, Salmonella typhimurium, and Escherichia coli.
- A dried ethanolic leaf extract of Abrus precatorius showed pancreato-protective effects and glucose lowering effects in Sprague-Dawley rats. This was found in another study to be through modulation of insulin and GLP-1 inversely with glucagon, noncompetitive inhibition of α-amylase and α-glucosidase, free radical scavenging, and recovery of damaged/necro-apoptosized pancreatic β-cells.

== Cultural significance ==
In Rajasthan, India, Chirmi song is associated with this plant. There is also evidence that this plant has significant economic value to the traditional Zulu people, due to the fact that it is a form of income for Zulu people that make and sell crafts that were made from the seeds of this plant.

During the Tang dynasty, Wang Wei wrote a poem titled "One-hearted" (Xiāng Sī / 相思), which most likely refers to Abrus precatorius as a "red bean" (hóng dòu / 红豆).

In Mathura, India, the god Vishnu and Krishna is associated with the seeds of the plant. Lord Krishna is sometimes depicted wearing the seeds on a mala (rosary).

== Gallery ==
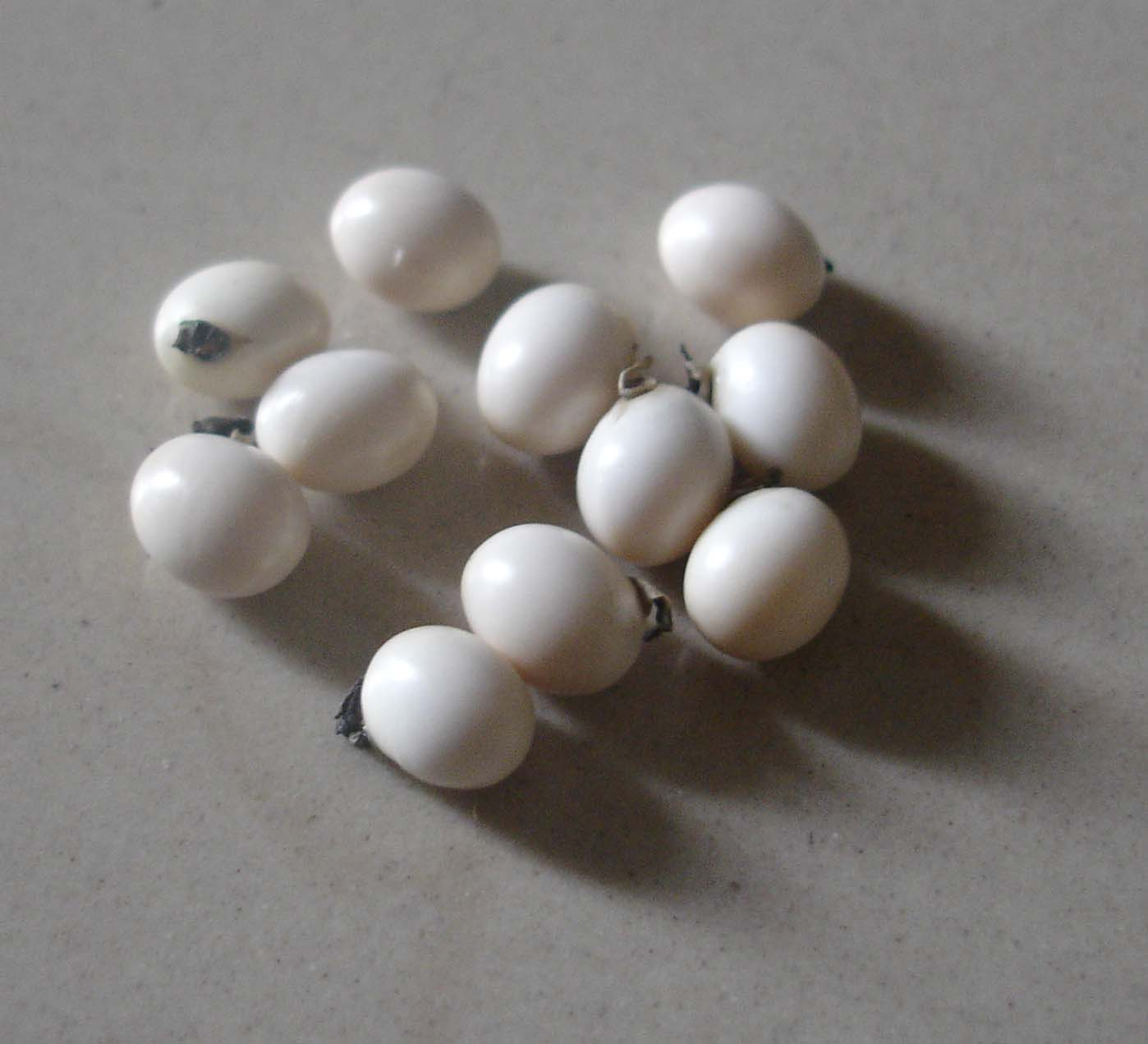
White variety of seeds

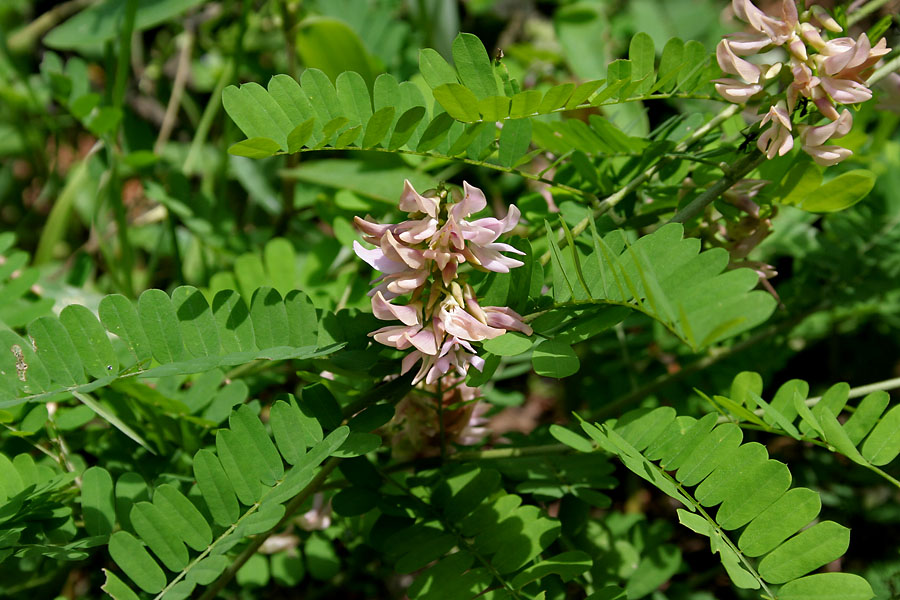
Abrus precatorius leaves and flowers

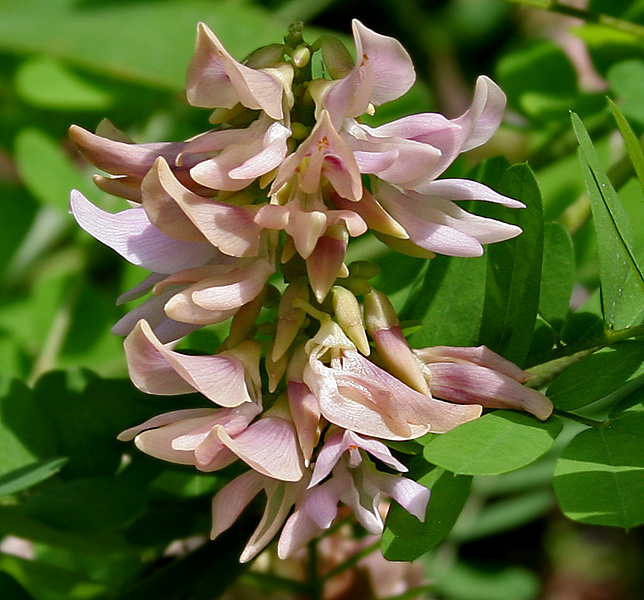
Abrus precatorius flowers

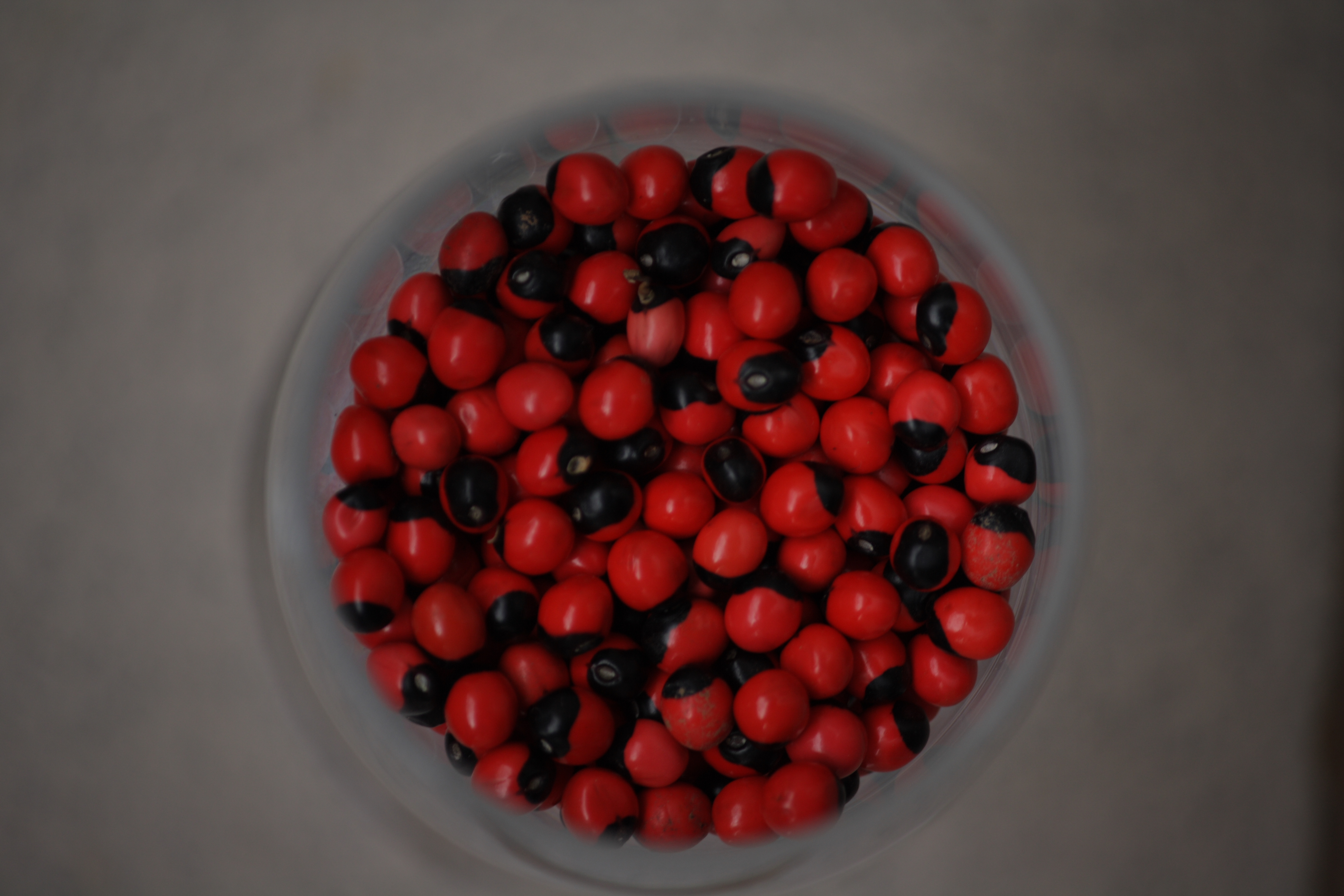
Abrus precatorius seeds

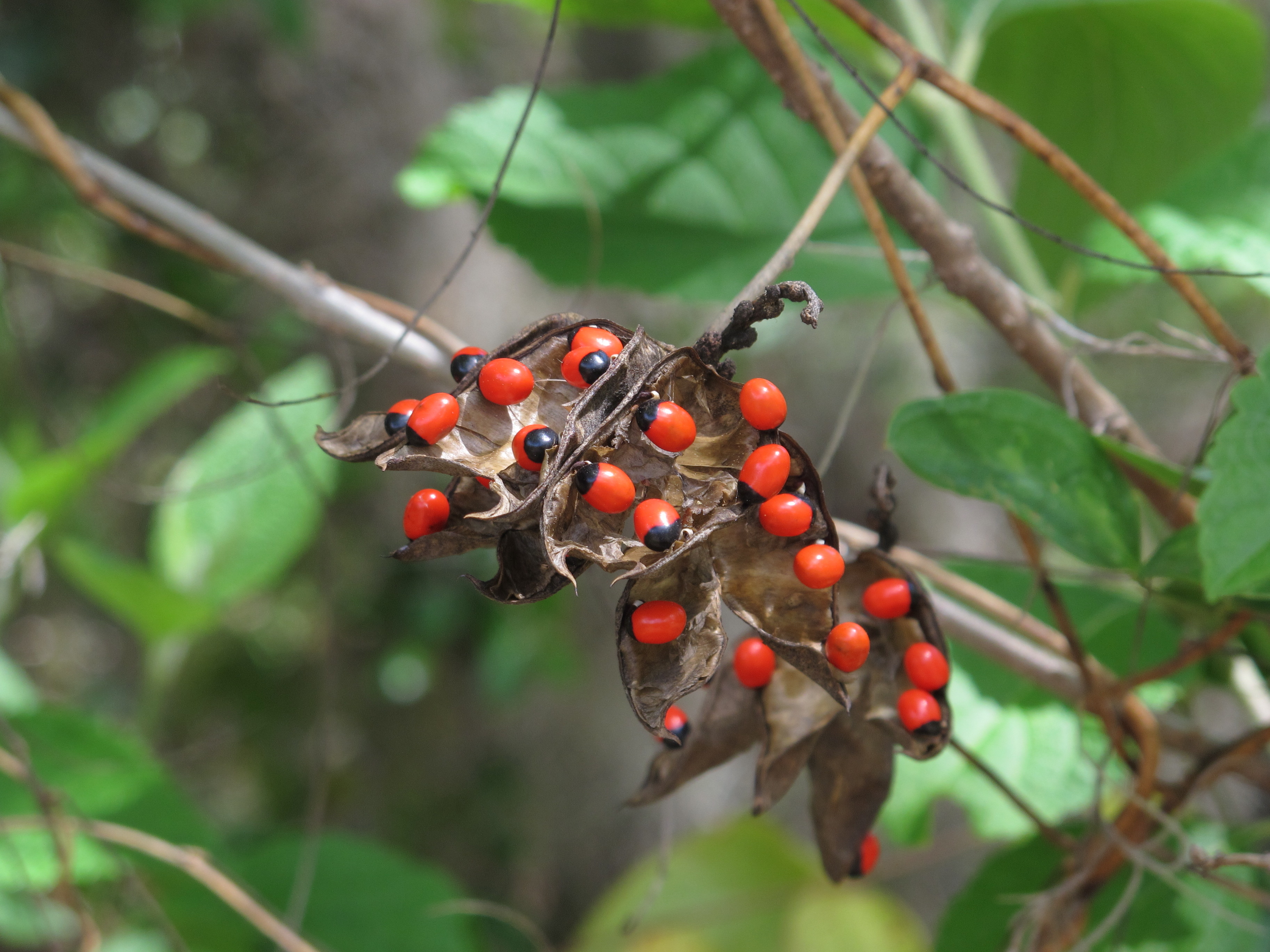

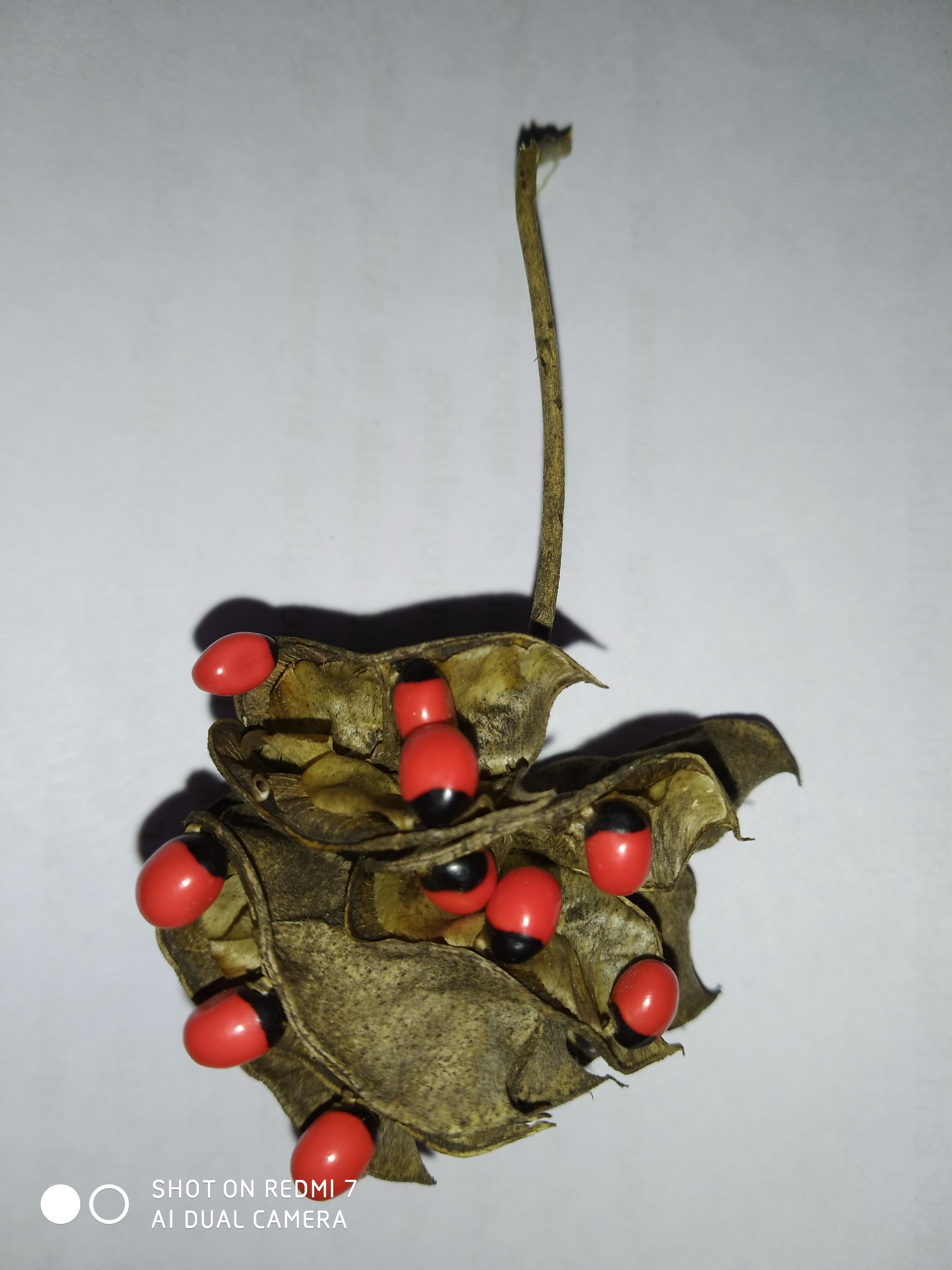

== See also ==
- List of plants of Caatinga vegetation of Brazil
- List of poisonous plants
