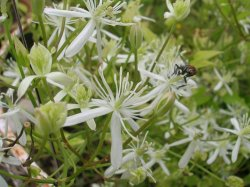
- Clematis recta in New Delhi

Scientific classification
- Kingdom: Plantae
- Clade: Tracheophytes
- Clade: Angiosperms
- Clade: Eudicots
- Order: Ranunculales
- Family: Ranunculaceae
- Genus: Clematis
- Species: C. recta

Binomial name
- Clematis recta L.

Synonyms
- List: Anemone recta (L.) E.H.L.Krause; Anemone recta (L.) K.Krause; Clematis bracteosa Banks; Clematis bracteosa Banks ex Steud.; Clematis corymbosa Poir.; Clematis erecta All.; Clematis erecta L.; Clematis erecta var. plena Lemoine; Clematis erecta var. plena Lemoine ex T.Moore & Jackman; Clematis erecta var. umbellata Rchb.; Clematis hispanica Mill.; Clematis mandshurica var. lathyrifolia Maxim.; Clematis recta f. pleniflora (Kuntze) Rehder; Clematis recta subsp. lancifolia (Wender.) Wender.; Clematis recta subsp. stricta (Wender.) Wender.; Clematis recta var. cordifolia Wender.; Clematis recta var. glaucescens Regel; Clematis recta var. macrophylla Wender.; Clematis recta var. ovata Wender.; Clematis recta var. pleniflora Kuntze; Clematis recta var. strictissima Wender.; Clematis recta var. tarnopoliensis Zapal.; Clematis stricta Wender.; Clematis tenuiflora DC.; Clematis umbraticola Schur; Clematitis erecta (L.) Couret-Vill.; Clematitis erecta (L.) Steud.; Clematitis recta (L.) Moench

= Clematis recta =

Species of flowering plant

Clematis recta, the erect climaxis or ground virgins, is a species of Clematis unusual in that it is a free-standing shrub rather than a climbing plant. Growing usually on the margins of woodland areas, it is native to Eastern, Southern and Mid Europe.

Two varieties are accepted:

- Clematis erecta nothovar. hybrida Lemoine ex Bonard
- Clematis erecta var. erecta
