= Abrin =

Abrin-a
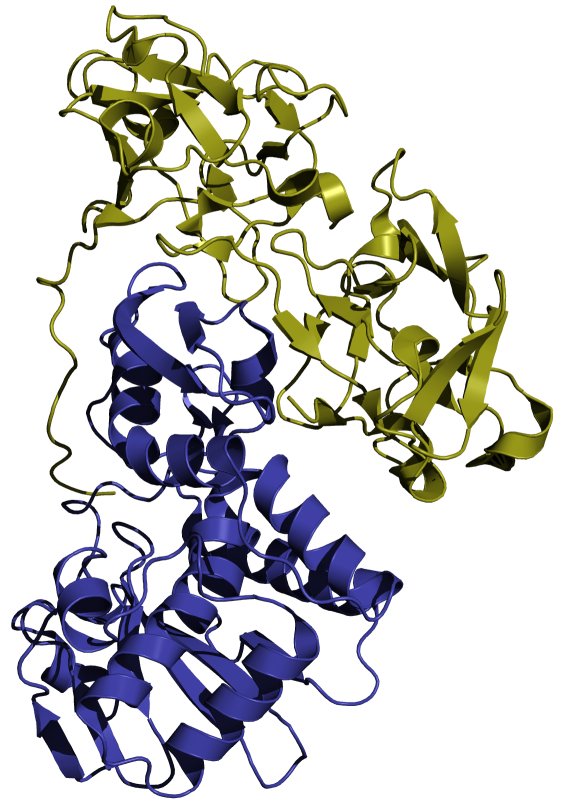
- Abrin-a structure (PDB: 1ABR). The A chain is shown in blue and the B chain in olive. A single peptide is cleaved into the two chains.

Identifiers
- Organism: Abrus precatorius
- Symbol: ?
- CAS number: 1393-62-0
- Orthologs: OMA: entry
- UniProt: P11140
Search for
- Structures: Swiss-model
- Domains: InterPro

Abrin
Identifiers
CAS Number	1393-62-0
ChemSpider	none
KEGG	C20068
RTECS number	AA5250000
UNII	6YCF89P8OX
UN number	3462
- Except where otherwise noted, data are given for materials in their standard state (at 25 °C [77 °F], 100 kPa). Infobox references

Abrin is an extremely toxic toxalbumin found in the seeds of the rosary pea (or jequirity pea), Abrus precatorius. It has a median lethal dose of 0.7 micrograms per kilogram of body mass when given to mice intravenously (approximately 3.86 times more toxic than ricin, being 2.7 micrograms per kilogram). The median toxic dose for humans ranges from 10 to 1000 micrograms per kilogram when ingested and is 3.3 micrograms per kilogram when inhaled.

Abrin is a ribosome inhibiting protein like ricin, a toxin which can be found in the seeds of the castor oil plant, and pulchellin, a toxin which can be found in the seeds of Abrus pulchellus. Abrin is classed as a "select agent" under U.S. law.

== Occurrence ==
Abrin is naturally produced exclusively by the rosary pea and constitutes approximately 0.08% of the plant's brightly colored seeds. The release of the toxin is inhibited by the seed coat; thus, if the seed coat is damaged or destroyed (for instance, by chewing), the toxin may be released.

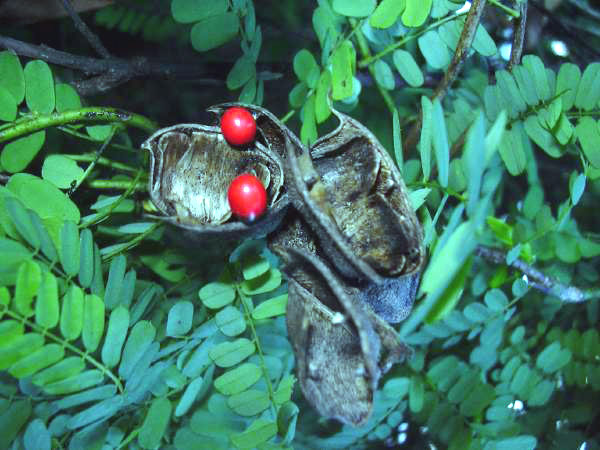
The rosary pea is the source plant of abrin

== Physical properties ==
Abrin is a water-soluble lectin. Abrin in powdered form is yellowish-white. It is a stable substance. It can withstand 30 minutes of heating at 60 °C (140 °F), but loses most of its toxicity after 30 minutes at 80 °C (176 °F). Though it is combustible, it does not polymerize easily and is not particularly volatile.

== Biochemistry ==
Chemically, abrin is a mixture of four isotoxins, these being abrin-a (P11140), -b (Q06077), -c (P28590), and -d (Q06076). Occasionally, the homologous low-toxicity hemagglutinin of Abrus precatorius (Q9M6E9; AAG) is also included as the fifth protein under the collective name 'abrin'.

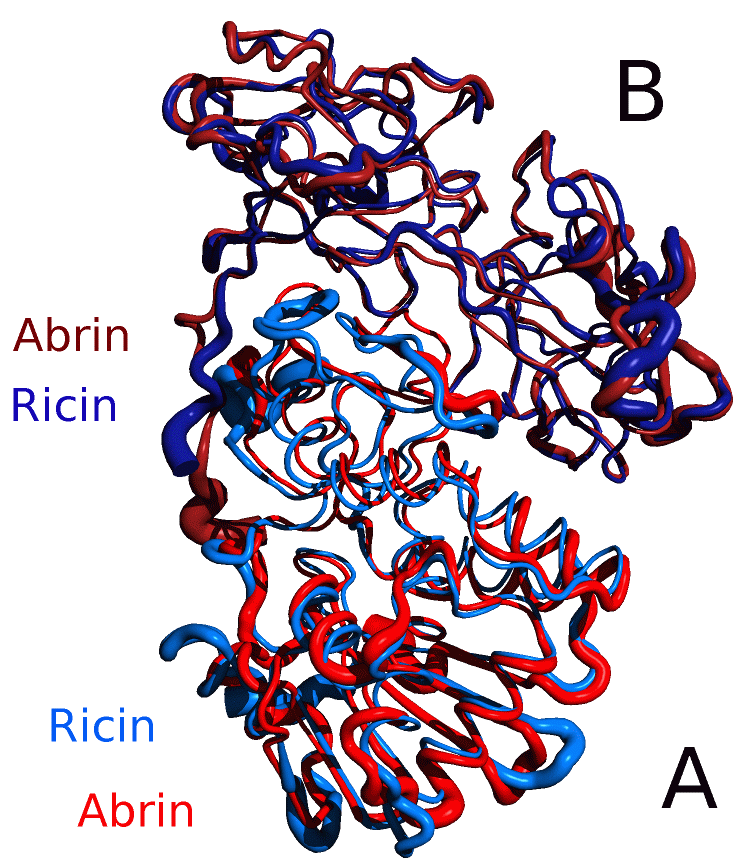
A comparison of the similar structures of abrin-a (red) and ricin (blue)

Abrin-a is the most potent of the four isotoxins, encoded for by an intron-free gene, and consists of two subunits or chains, A and B. The primary product of protein biosynthesis, preproabrin, consists of a signal peptide sequence, the amino acid sequences for subunits A and B, and a linker. A molecule of abrin-a has a total of 528 amino acids and is about 65 kDa in mass. Abrin-a is formed after the cleavage of a signal peptide sequence and post-translational modifications such as glycosylation and disulfide bridge formation in the endoplasmic reticulum (ER). The other three abrins, as well as the agglutinin, have a similar structure.

In terms of structure, abrin-a is related to the lectin, ricin, produced in the seeds of Ricinus communis.

== Use ==
Abrin is not known to have been weaponised. However, due to its high toxicity and the possibility of being processed into an aerosol, the use of abrin as a biological weapon is possible in principle. Despite this, the rosary pea yields only small quantities of abrin, which reduces the risk.

The rosary pea is common to tropical regions, and is occasionally employed as an herbal remedy for certain conditions. While the outer shell of the seed protects its contents from the stomachs of most mammals, the seed coats are occasionally punctured to make beaded jewelry. This can lead to poisoning if a seed is swallowed, or if such jewelry is worn against damaged skin.

Abrin has been shown to act as an immunoadjuvant in the treatment of cancer in mice.

== Toxicology ==
Symptoms of abrin poisoning include diarrhea, vomiting, colic, tachycardia, and tremors. Death usually occurs after a few days due to kidney failure, heart failure, and/or respiratory paralysis.

=== Toxicity ===
Although there is no consensus on the level of lethal dose in humans after oral intake, it is assumed that the intake of 0.1 to 1 microgram per kilogram of body weight, or the consumption of a single seed of the rosary pea, may be fatal, but this information is insufficiently documented. According to other estimates, the LD_{50} value of abrin is between 10 and 1000 μg/kg and is comparable to that of ricin. The severity of the effects of abrin poisoning vary on the means of exposure to the substance (whether inhaled, ingested, or injected). Exposure to abrin on the skin can cause an allergic reaction, indicated by blisters, redness, irritation, and pain, however, there is no evidence of toxicity after skin contact.

Abrin is significantly more toxic following intravenous administration. The LD_{50} values obtained vary between 0.03 and 0.06 μg/kg in rabbits and between 1.25 and 1.3 μg/kg in dogs, depending on the species. In clinical studies involving cancer patients, up to 0.3 μg/kg of intravenous abrin immunotoxin was tolerated without the development of serious symptoms of toxicity.

The toxicity of abrin is increased if it is inhaled. In rats, the LD_{50} for this route of administration is 3.3 μg/kg.

=== Toxicodynamics ===
Abrin resembles ricin, in that it also is a type 2 ribosome-inactivating protein (RIP-II) with a similar mode of action, but the effect of abrin is more potent than that of ricin. The toxic effect of abrin is due to an intracellular, multi-step process. Abrin binds to and penetrates the cells of the body, inhibiting cell protein synthesis after being transported to the endoplasmic reticulum (ER). By attaching its non-specifically binding B chain, which acts as a haptomer, to the carbohydrate chain of a glycoprotein on the cell surface, the abrin molecule anchors itself to the cell and is subsequently engulfed. However, both specific and nonspecific binding result in the uptake of abrin via endocytosis, as well as the activation of the A chain, caused by the cleavage of the B chain. The activated A chain of abrin, the effectomer, then enters the inner parts of the cell, where it cleaves an adenine (A4324) nucleobase from the 28S rRNA of the large ribosomal subunit of a ribosome on or near the ER, inhibiting the regular process of cellular protein synthesis. Without these proteins, cells cannot survive. This is harmful to the human body and can be fatal in small exposures. Additionally, abrin also may bind to cells specifically bearing the mannose receptor on their surface; since this receptor is found in a particularly high density on cells of the reticulohistiocytic system, that system in particular is affected by the toxicity of abrin.

=== Toxicokinetics ===
Information dealing with the toxicokinetics of abrin is limited and debated. Due to its biochemical properties and its similarity to ricin, it is believed that abrin is at least partially degraded in the gastrointestinal tract. The size of the molecule also restricts absorption through the gastrointestinal tract. Nevertheless, the numerous deaths caused from consuming rosary pea seeds confirm that enough of the toxin can be absorbed into the systemic circulation via the gastrointestinal tract to cause death.

Murine studies show that there is an accumulation of abrin after injection, in the liver, kidneys, spleen, blood cells, lungs, and heart. The molecule is excreted via the kidneys after it undergoes proteolytic cleavage.

== Signs and symptoms of abrin exposure ==
The major symptoms of abrin poisoning depend on the route of exposure and the dose received, though many organs may be affected in severe cases. In general, symptoms can appear anywhere between several hours to several days after exposure. Initial symptoms of abrin poisoning by inhalation may occur within 8 hours of exposure but a more typical time course is 18–24 hours; they can prove fatal within 36–72 hours. Following ingestion of abrin, initial symptoms usually occur rapidly, but can take up to five days to appear.

The later signs and symptoms of exposure are caused by abrin's cytotoxic effects, killing cells in the kidney, liver, adrenal glands, and central nervous system.

=== Inhalation ===
Within a few hours of inhaling abrin, common symptoms include fever, cough, airway irritation, chest tightness, pulmonary edema (excess fluid accumulated in the lungs), and nausea. This makes breathing difficult (called dyspnea), and the skin might turn blue or black in a condition called cyanosis, which is a symptom of hypoxia. Excess fluid in the lungs can be diagnosed by x-ray or by listening to the chest with a stethoscope. As the effects of abrin progress, a person can become diaphoretic (sweating heavily) and fluid can build up further. Their blood pressure may drop dramatically, keeping oxygen from reaching the brain and other vital organs in a condition called shock, and respiratory failure may occur, which can be fatal within 36 to 72 hours. If an exposure to abrin by inhalation is not fatal, the airway can become sensitized or irritated.

=== Ingestion ===
Swallowing any amount of abrin can lead to a slow-burn process of severe symptoms. Early symptoms include nausea, vomiting, pain in the mouth, throat, and esophagus, diarrhea, dysphagia (trouble swallowing), and abdominal cramps and pain. As the symptoms progress, bleeding and inflammation begins in the gastrointestinal tract. The affected person can vomit up blood (hematemesis), have blood in their feces, which creates a black, tarry stool called melena, and more internal bleeding. Loss of blood volume and water from nausea, vomiting, diarrhea, and bleeding causes blood pressure to drop and organ damage to begin, which can be seen as the person begins to have somnolence/drowsiness, hematuria (blood in the urine), stupor, convulsions, polydipsia (excessive thirst), and oliguria (low urine production). This ultimately results in multi-system organ failure, hypovolemic shock, vascular collapse, and death.

=== Absorption ===
Abrin can be absorbed through broken skin or absorbed through the skin if dissolved in certain solvents. It can also be injected in small pellets and absorbed through contact with the eyes. Abrin in the powder or mist form can cause redness and pain in the eyes (i.e. conjunctivitis) in small doses. Small doses absorbed through the eyes can also cause tearing (lacrimation). Higher doses can cause tissue damage, severe bleeding at the back of the eye (retinal hemorrhage), and vision impairment or blindness. A large enough dose can be absorbed into the bloodstream and lead to systemic toxicity.

== Treatment ==
Because no antidote exists for abrin, the most important factor is avoiding abrin exposure in the first place. If exposure cannot be avoided, the most important factor is then getting the abrin off or out of the body as quickly as possible. Abrin exposure can be prevented when it is present in large quantities by wearing appropriate personal protective equipment. Abrin poisoning is treated with supportive care to minimize the effects of the poisoning. This care varies based on the route of exposure and the time since exposure. For recent ingestion, administration of activated charcoal and gastric lavage are both options. Using an emetic (vomiting agent) is not a useful treatment. In cases of eye exposure, flushing the eye with saline helps to remove abrin. Oxygen therapy, airway management, assisted ventilation, monitoring, IV fluid administration, and electrolyte replacement are also important components of treatment.

== See also ==
- European mistletoe
- Ricin
