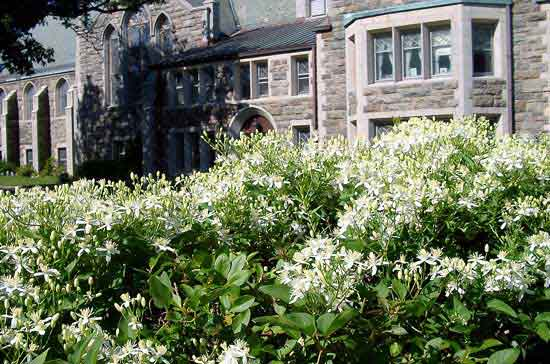
- Blooming vine

Scientific classification
- Kingdom: Plantae
- Clade: Tracheophytes
- Clade: Angiosperms
- Clade: Eudicots
- Order: Ranunculales
- Family: Ranunculaceae
- Genus: Clematis
- Species: C. terniflora

Binomial name
- Clematis terniflora DC.

= Clematis terniflora =

Sweet autumn clematis

Species of flowering plant in the buttercup family

Clematis terniflora (sweet autumn clematis, sweet autumn virginsbower) is a plant in the buttercup family, Ranunculaceae. It is native to northeastern Asia (China, Japan, Korea, Mongolia, Siberia and Taiwan). It was introduced into the United States in the late 1800s as an ornamental garden plant, and has naturalized in many of the eastern states. It is considered a Category II invasive plant in north and central Florida and some other eastern states, meaning it is invading native plant communities but is not yet seen as displacing native species.

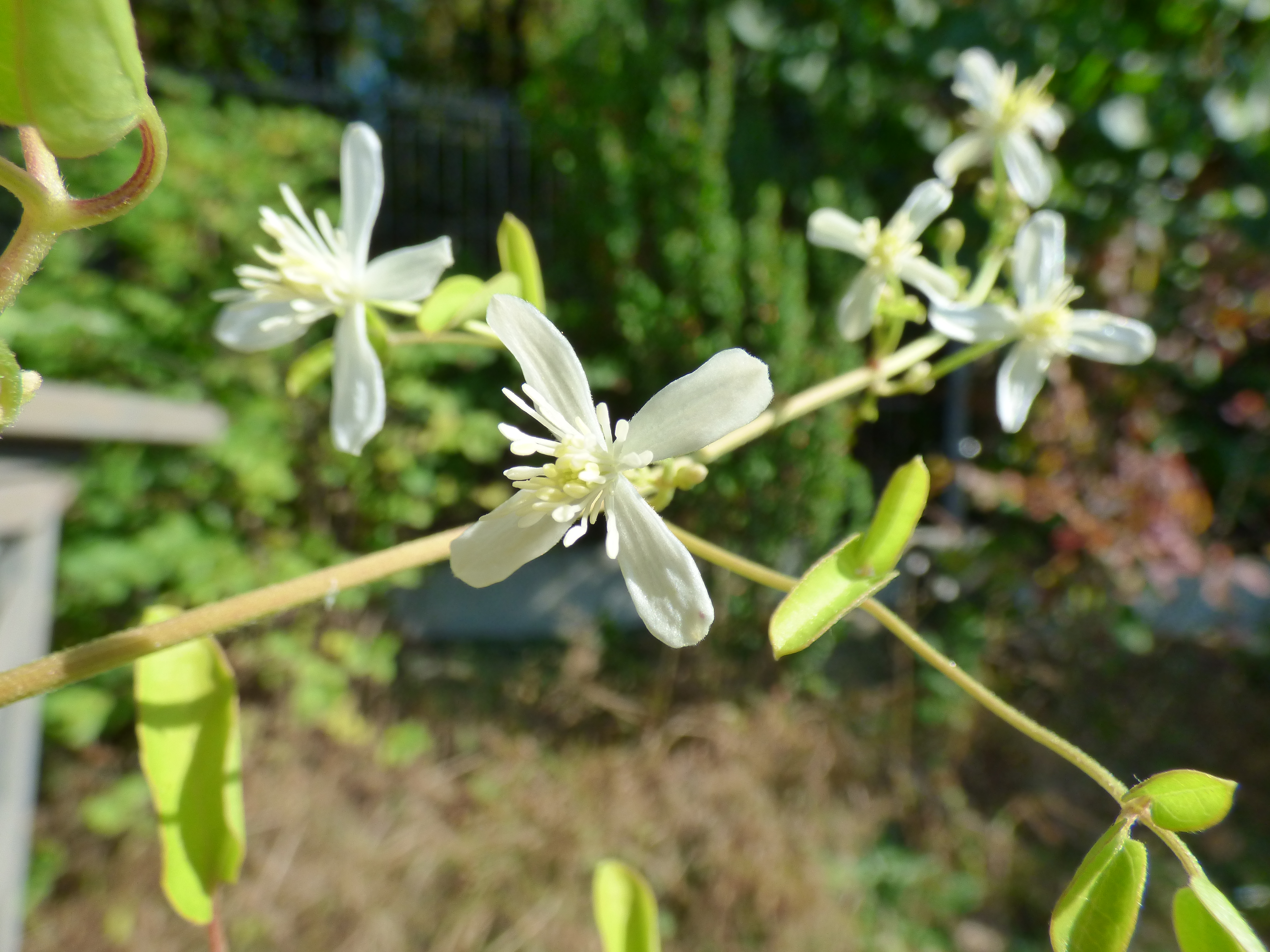
clematis

== Description ==
Clematis terniflora is a vine with opposite, pinnately compound, leathery-textured, shiny green leaves (3-5 oval to elliptic leaflets with cordate bases). Vines woody. Branches shallowly 4--10-grooved, climbing stems. The flowers are white, blooming in fall. Flowers bisexual, often some unisexual in same inflorescence; pedicel 1-3.5 cm, slender; sepals wide spreading, not recurved, white, linear or elliptic to lanceolate or narrowly obovate The plant can get anywhere from 15 to 30 ft tall, and 15 to 30 ft wide. In late fall, the fertilized flowers become seed clusters of 5-6 fruits connected at the heads and each having a long white tail. As these dry, the color of the fruits fade and the tail becomes feather-like. In the spring the fruits detach and are dispersed by wind. The plants are self-seeding and aggressive. Common problems include aphids, vine weevils, leaf spot, stem rot, and powdery mildew.

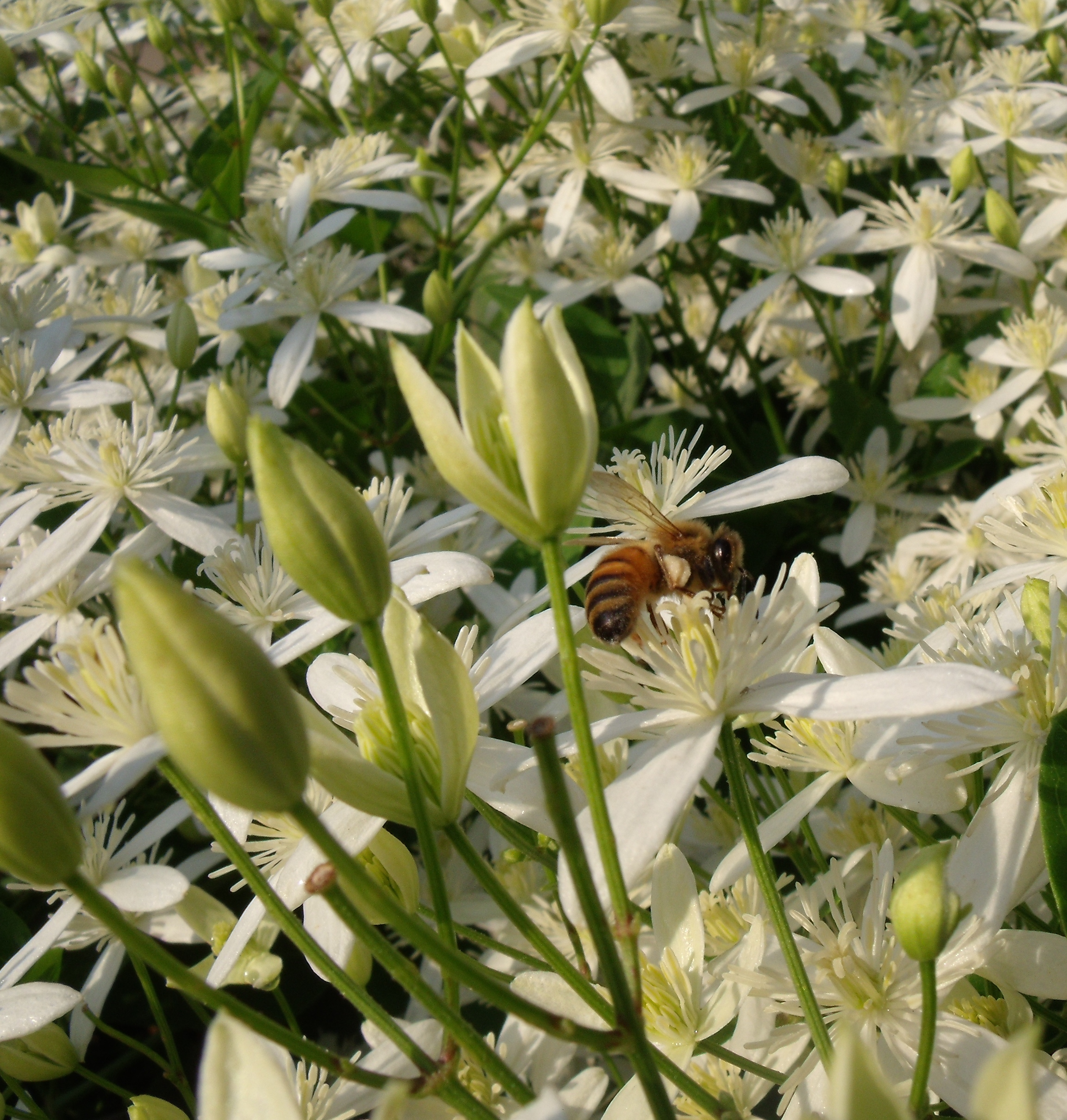
Honeybee on sweet autumn clematis

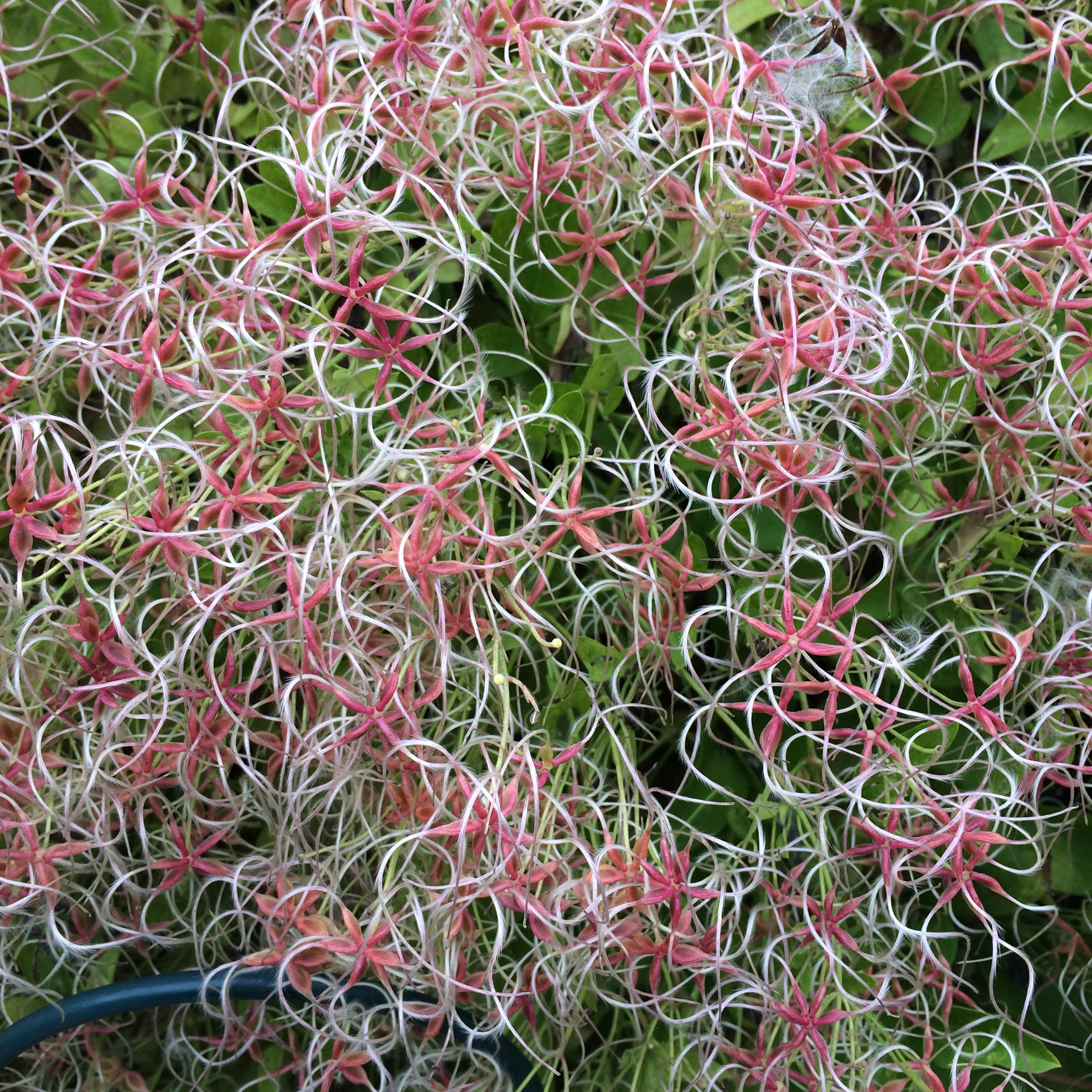
Clematis terniflora seed clusters on plant

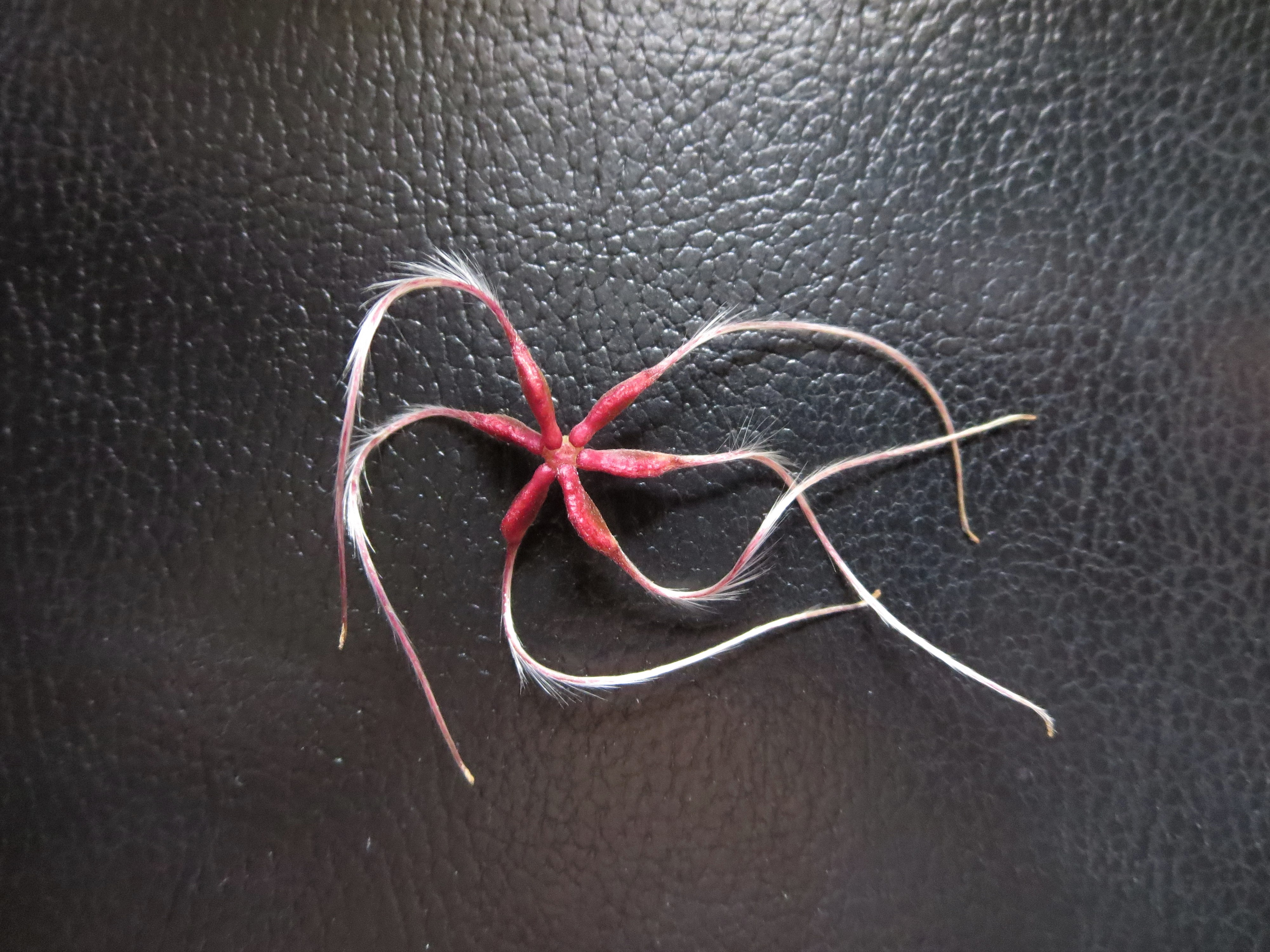
Clematis terniflora single seed cluster, early

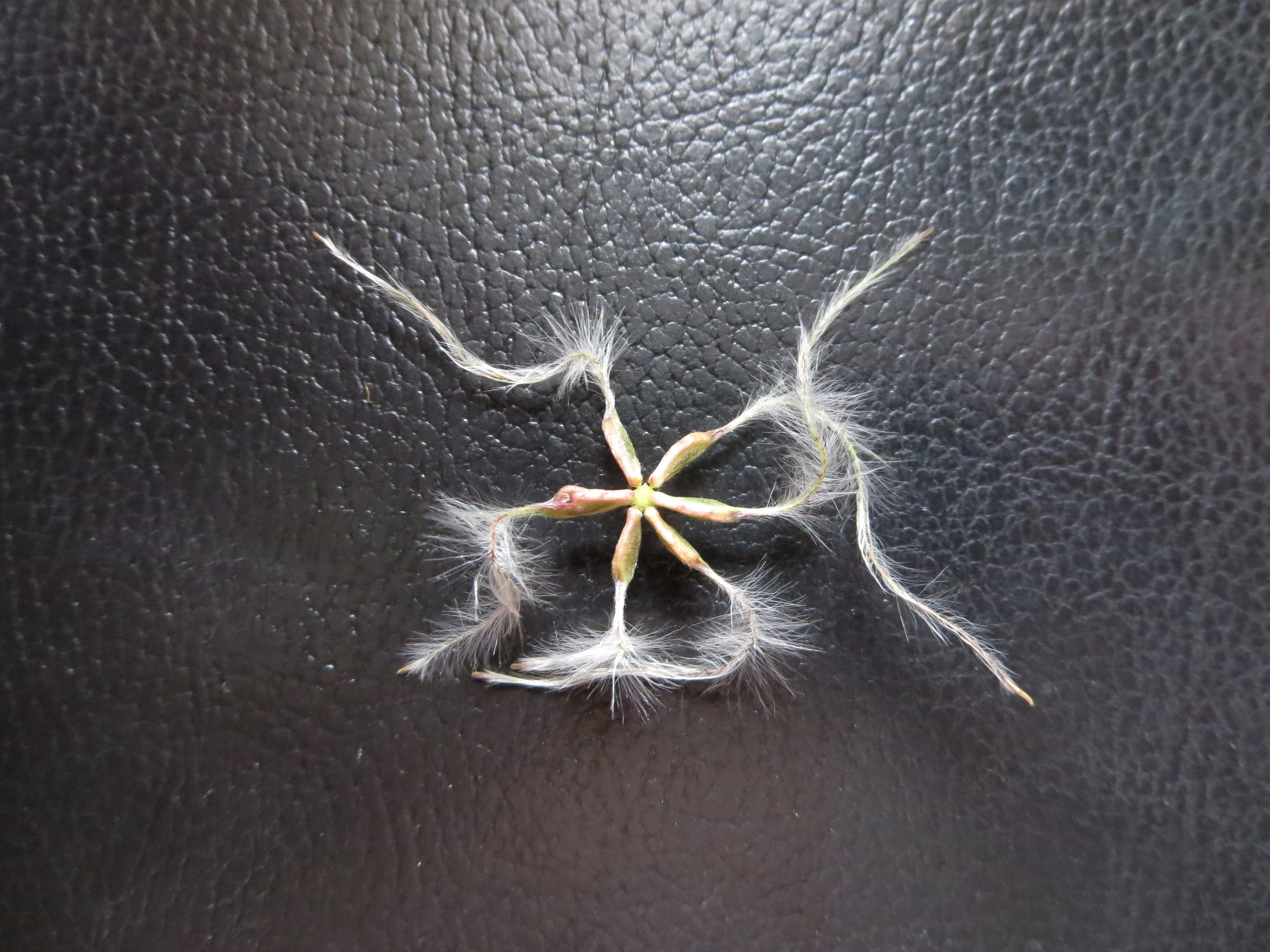
Clematis terniflora single seed cluster, late

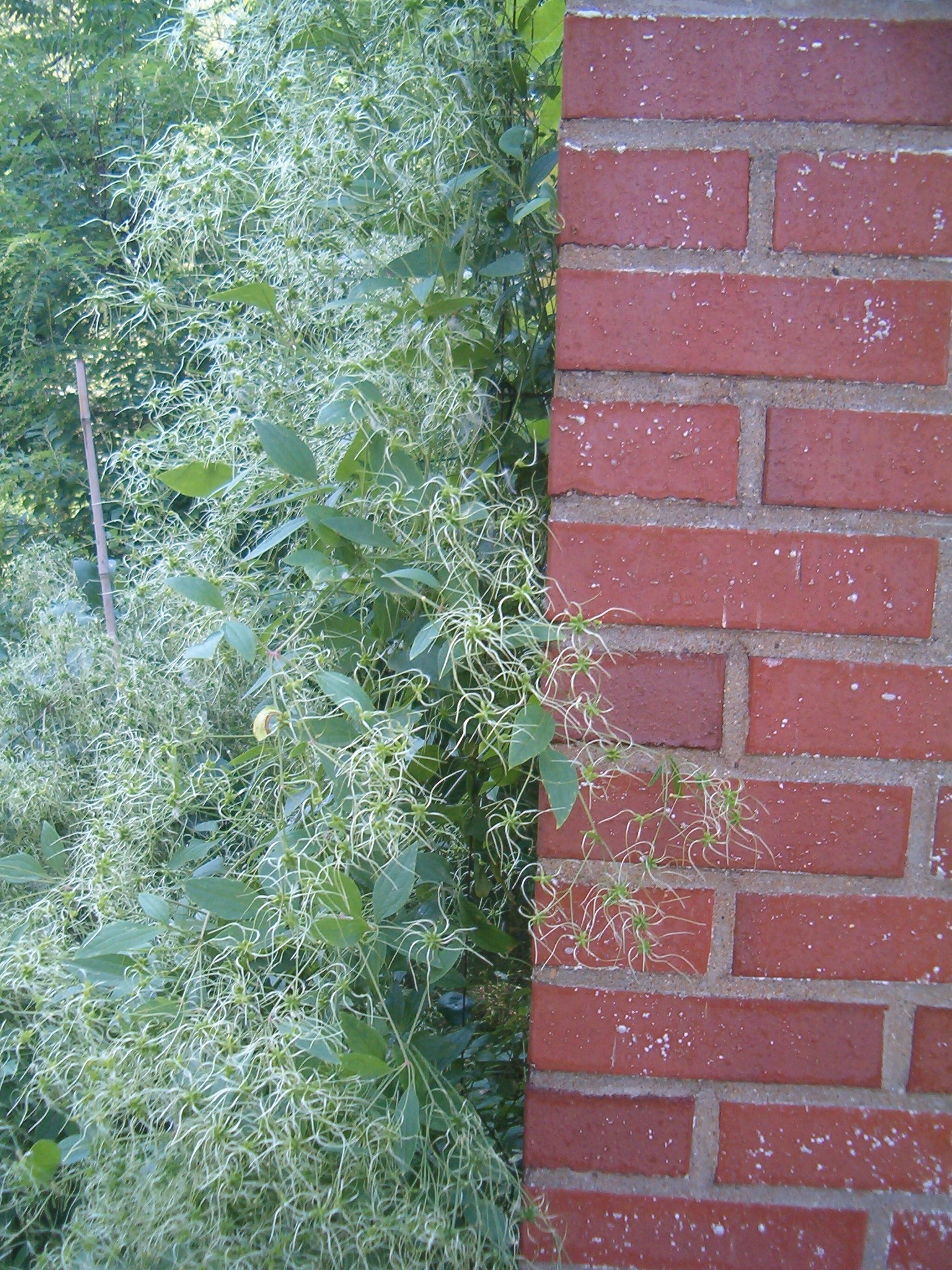
clematis on brick wall

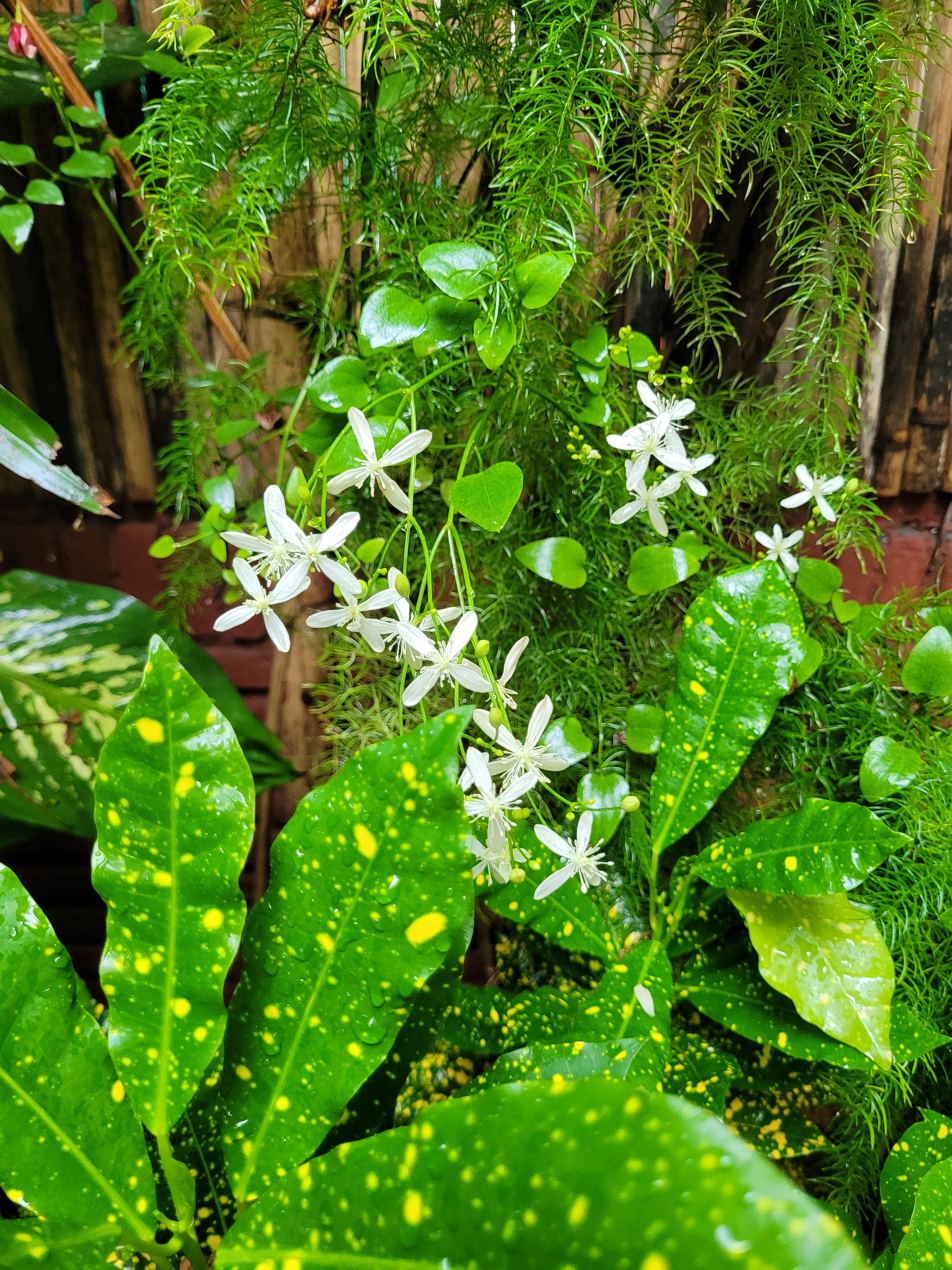
Clematis terniflora along with other plants

== Taxonomy ==
Clematis terniflora is part of the family Ranunculaceae. The buttercup family includes the genus Clematis, which has 380 species. Clematis terniflora shares similarities with many of the other Clematis species. It is closely related to C. virginiana, C. verticillaris, and C. viticella.

== Distribution and habitat ==
Clematis terniflora is native to northeastern Asia (Amur, China North-Central, China South-Central, China Southeast, Inner Mongolia, Japan, Khabarovsk, Korea, Manchuria, Nansei-Shoto, Ogasawara-Shoto, Primorye, Taiwan). It was introduced into the United States in the late 1800s as an ornamental garden plant and has naturalized in many of the eastern and Midwestern states. It thrives in the US growing zones 4-9. It is normally found along the edges of forests and places with lots of sun exposure.

== Uses ==
The leaf of the Clematis terniflora is being studied for its anti-inflammatory effects. It has been used in traditional Chinese medicine as a cure for tonsillitis, cholelithiasis, and conjunctivitis. Researchers are examining the anti-inflammatory effect of an ethanol extract of leaves of C. terniflora using activated macrophages that play central roles in inflammatory response. This research is an effort to find an effective pharmacotherapy treatment for ALI (Acute Lung Injury). The plant is used as a decorative garden plant in the USA. With a variety of growing habits, from ground cover to climbing fences and trellises, it provides a dense blanket like landscaping effect. Clematis terniflora can also be aggressively pruned into a shrub like bush, however it requires heavy pruning and care. It is also used by pollinators the late summer and early autumn months.

== Cultivation ==
Prefers full sun, but will flower in partial shade. These woody-stemmed plants can be pruned in fall or early spring to within a couple of feet of the ground, and will vine up fence, trellis, arbors (or other plants) to heights of 10 to 30 feet. Clematis ternifolia can also be allowed to sprawl along the ground as a dense ground cover. Blooms on new growth. No serious insect or disease problems. Does not require fertilizer or frequent watering, although will benefit from a low nitrogen fertilizer such as 5-10-10 in spring. Considered deer resistant.

== Invasiveness ==
Clematis terniflora is not a native to the United States, but it can be found throughout. Brought over as an ornamental cultivar the plants were originally not considered invasive. It is now considered a Category II invasive plant, meaning it is invading native plant communities but has not yet seen as displacing native species. They establish and spread quickly and often undetected until it is too late.

== Etymology ==
The origin of the genus Clematis comes from the Greek term klematis, which was a word for a climbing and vining plant. The root word Klema means a broken branch or twig, likely used for grafting. Klema stems from the word Klan, meaning to break. The origin of the species name terniflora is Latin for flowers in three. The full scientific name, Clematis terniflora means vining plant that flowers in three.
