= Ribosome-inactivating protein =

Protein synthesis inhibitor

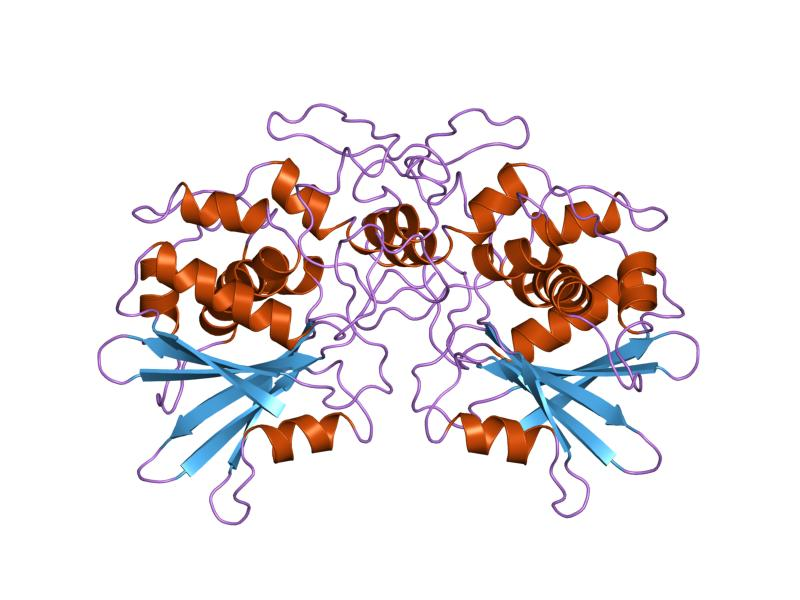
- Structure of pokeweed antiviral protein.

Identifiers
- Symbol: RIP
- Pfam: PF00161
- InterPro: IPR001574
- PROSITE: PDOC00248
- SCOP2: 1paf / SCOPe / SUPFAM
Available protein structures:
- PDB: PDB: 1abr PDB: 1aha PDB: 1ahb PDB: 1ahc PDB: 1apa PDB: 1apg PDB: 1br5 PDB: 1br6 PDB: 1bry PDB: 1cf5 IPR001574 PF00161 (ECOD; PDBsum)
- AlphaFold: IPR001574; PF00161

A ribosome-inactivating protein (RIP) is a protein synthesis inhibitor that acts at the eukaryotic ribosome. This protein family describes a large family of such proteins that work by acting as rRNA N-glycosylase (EC 3.2.2.22). They inactivate 60S ribosomal subunits by an N-glycosidic cleavage, which releases a specific adenine base from the sugar-phosphate backbone of 28S rRNA. RIPs exist in bacteria and plants.

Members of the family include shiga toxins, and type I (e.g. trichosanthin, agrostin and luffin) and type II (e.g. ricin, agglutinin, and abrin) ribosome inactivating proteins (RIPs). All these toxins are structurally related. RIPs have been of considerable interest because of their potential use, conjugated with monoclonal antibodies, as immunotoxins to treat cancers. Further, trichosanthin has been shown to have potent activity against HIV-1-infected T cells and macrophages. Elucidation of the structure-function relationships of RIPs has therefore become a major research effort. It is now known that RIPs are structurally related. A conserved glutamic residue has been implicated in the catalytic mechanism; this lies near a conserved arginine residue, which also plays a role in catalysis.

Only a minority of RIPs are toxic to humans when consumed, and proteins of this family are found in the vast majority of plants used for human consumption, such as Rice, Maize, and Barley. In plants, they are thought to defend against pathogens and insects.

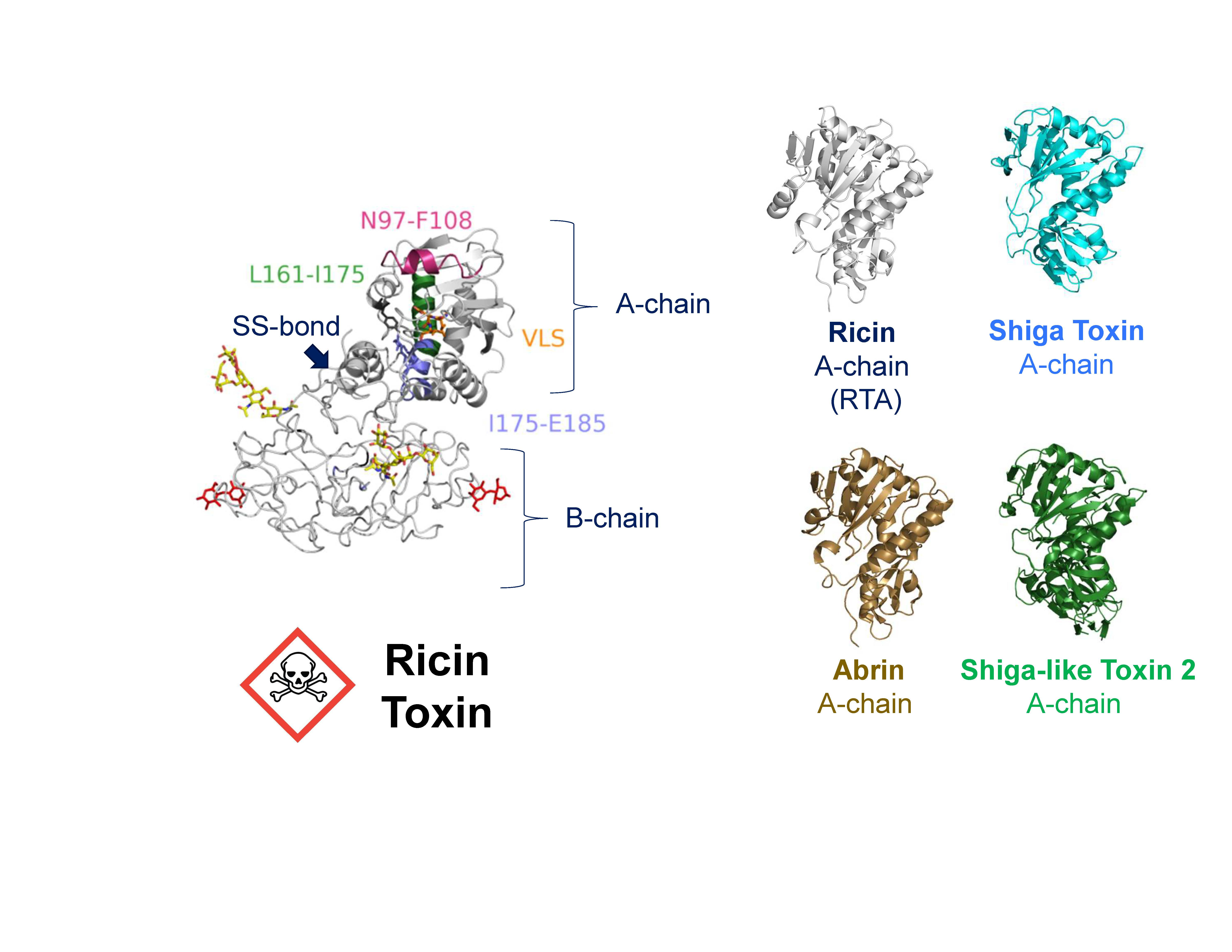
Structural Similarities among RIPs. Original figure can be found in

== Classification ==
Ribosome-inactivating proteins (RIPs) are separated into the following types based on protein domain composition:

- Type I (A): RIPs-I are polypeptides composed of an A domain. This is the site of N-glycosidase activity.
- Type II (AB): RIPs-II are composed of an A domain with similar structure and catalytic activity to Type I RIPs, and a new B domain with carbohydrate-binding (lectin) properties. The B domain is able to bind galactosyl moieties on the cell surface which facilitates entry into the cell, thus making Type II particularly cytotoxic. The A and B domains are fused together by disulfide bonds.
- Type III: RIPs-III are separated into two subgroups.
  - One subgroup (AC) contains the same original RIP domain (A), and a C-terminal with unknown functionality.
  - The other subgroup (AD) is similar to Type I, but contains a site for inactivation.
- Shiga toxin belongs to its own group, as the carbohydrate-binding ability (B5 domain) evolved separately and the catalytic domain is closer to type I (A) RIPs than to type II (AB).

== Examples ==
Examples include:

- Type A: Plant antiviral proteins (Beetin, Saporin, Pokeweed antiviral protein (Phytolacca americana), Trichosanthin, Agrostin (Agrostemma githago)), a Spiroplasma toxin
- Type AB: Abrin, Ricin, Viscumin (European mistletoe)
- Type AC:
- Type AD:
- Shiga toxin
