= Gelonin =

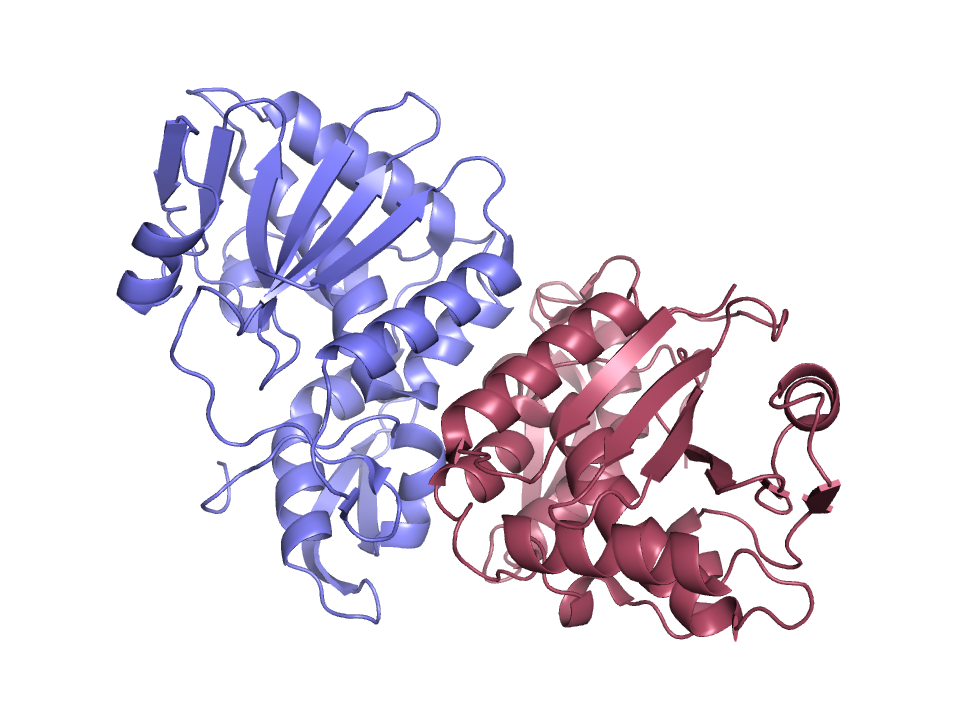
Gelonin is a dimer consisting of two identical monomers, colored red and blue. PBD 3ktz

Gelonin is a type 1 ribosome-inactivating protein and toxin of approximately 30 kDa found in the seeds of the Himalayan plant Gelonium multiflorum. In cell-free systems gelonin exerts powerful N-glycosidase activity on the 28S rRNA unit of eukaryotic ribosomes by cleaving out adenine at the 4324 site. Gelonin lacks carbohydrate-binding domains so it is unable to cross the plasma membrane, making it highly effective only in cell free systems.

== Structure ==
Gelonin is a 30 kDa protein. Gelonin is a dimer, consisting of two identical monomers. Each monomer is composed of 251 amino acids, for a total of 502 residues. Gelonin is classified as an (α + β) protein, as its secondary structure consists of both beta sheets and alpha helices. Each monomer’s first 100 amino acids form 10 beta sheets, while their last 151 amino acids form 10 alpha helices. Gelonin’s two dimers are stabilized by hydrophobic interactions and hydrogen bonds. Specifically, the Asn22, Arg178, Asn180, and Lys237 residues of each monomer hydrogen bond with each other to stabilize the molecules. Likewise, the hydrophobic residues Tyr14, Ile15, Val16 and Pro38 from one monomer form hydrophobic interactions with the same residues in the adjacent monomer to further stabilize the dimer.

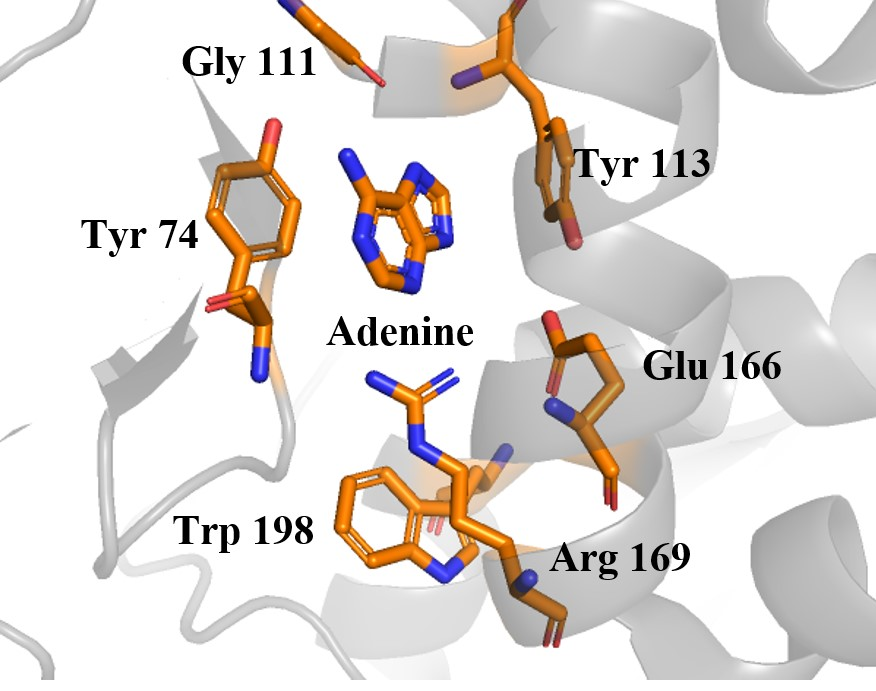
Active site of gelonin. PBD 3ku0

=== Active Site ===
Gelonin’s active site is a cleft formed by six key residues: Tyr74, Gly111, Tyr113, Glu166, Arg169, and Trp198. The shape of the active site is stabilized by hydrogen bonding between Gly111 and Tyr113. Tyr113, Glu166, and Arg169 residues in the activate site participate in the enzymatic removal of adenine at the 4324 site of eukaryotic 28S rRNA. Although the reaction mechanism of gelonin has yet to be characterized in detail, it is believed to take place in a manner that is conserved among other type 1 ribosome-inactivating proteins(RIP). According to research performed on other Type 1 RIPs, Tyr113 and Arg169 form hydrogen bonds with nitrogen atoms in the adenine nucleobase. This facilitates the cleavage of the glycoside bond connecting the nucleobase and ribose, creating a transition state with a positively charged oxocarbenium ion intermediate. The oxocarbenium ion is stabilized by the negative charge of Glu166. Gelonin’s active site also contains three water molecules, which act as nucleophiles and attack the oxocarbenium ion, completing the reaction.

== Therapeutic applications ==
Because of its ability to inhibit translation by cleaving eukaryotic 28S rRNA, gelonin has the potential to be utilized as a cancer therapy. The anticancer activity of gelonin has been demonstrated in numerous in vitro models. However, because of its hydrophilicity, gelonin is unable to internalize in cells. This has made clinical applications of the macromolecule difficult. Multiple gelonin delivery systems have been engineered, including conjugation to a cell-penetrating peptide, liposome encapsulation using listeriolysin O, and attachment to bispecific antibodies. All of these delivery systems have been shown to significantly decrease tumor size in vivo in a number of different cell lines. However, clinical trials for gelonin have yet to be authorized.

== See also ==
- Saporin
