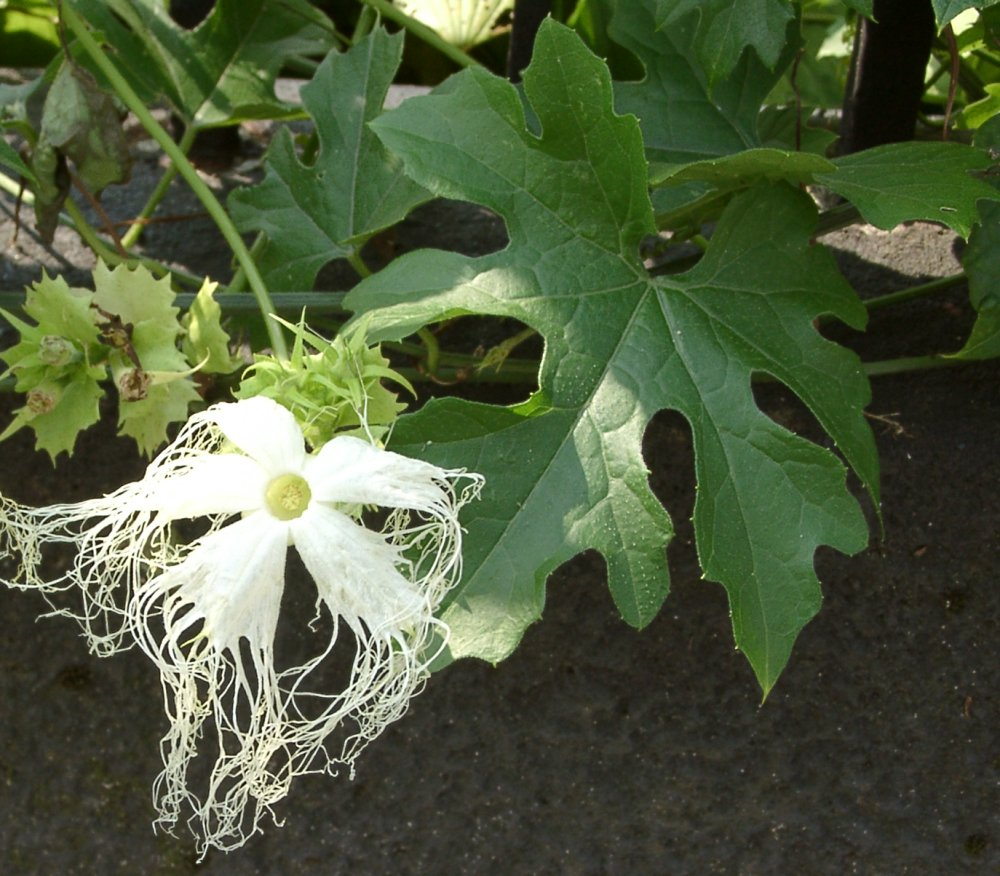

Scientific classification
- Kingdom: Plantae
- Clade: Embryophytes
- Clade: Tracheophytes
- Clade: Angiosperms
- Clade: Eudicots
- Clade: Rosids
- Order: Cucurbitales
- Family: Cucurbitaceae
- Genus: Trichosanthes
- Species: T. kirilowii

Binomial name
- Trichosanthes kirilowii Maxim.

Synonyms
- Trichosanthes japonica Regel

= Trichosanthes kirilowii =

Species of flowering plant

Trichosanthes kirilowii is a flowering plant in the family Cucurbitaceae found particularly in Henan, Shandong, Hebei, Shanxi, and Shaanxi (China). It is one of the 50 fundamental herbs used in traditional Chinese medicine, where it shares the name guālóu (Chinese: 栝蔞) with the related T. rosthornii. It is known as "Chinese cucumber" and "Chinese snake gourd" in English. (Note: Robinson and Decker-Walters (1997) p. 203-206: "Chinese snake gourd" preferred name for Trichosanthes kirilowii, and Trichosanthes kirilowii preferred definition for "chinese snake gourd".)

== Traditional uses ==
The tuber of this plant is known in Mandarin as tiān huā fěn (Chinese: 天花粉). In traditional Chinese medicine it is said to drain heat and generate fluids, clear and drain lung heat, transform phlegm, and moisten lung dryness, and resolve toxicity and expel pus. The fruit of the plant, also referred to in Mandarin as guālóu (Chinese: 瓜蔞), is said to clear heat and transform phlegm-heat, unbind the chest, reduce abscesses and dissipate nodules. Both forms should be considered safe only for use with professional guidance by someone trained in their use, though this may be an unnecessary extrapolation from the toxicity of purified trichosanthin. Extracts from the plant have been shown to damage the protein coat on the RNA of the AIDS virus in vitro.

== Chemical components ==
The plant is a source of the ricin-like protein trichosanthin.
