= David Flavell =

British academic research scientist

- Born: Southport, England
- Occupation: Cancer research scientist
- Years active: over 40 years

David J. Flavell is a British academic research scientist who specializes in the development of antibody-based treatments for adults and children with various forms of leukaemia and lymphoma.

== Early life ==
Born in Southport, Lancashire, in 1953, he obtained his bachelor's degree in applied Biology from Liverpool in 1975, and his Ph.D. in cancer immunology from Sheffield in 1978. He has held posts at the University of Sheffield (1975–78), Mahidol University, Bangkok, Thailand (1978–79), The University of London, London School of Hygiene and Tropical Medicine (1979–1983) and the University of Southampton Medical School (1984–2005). He became a member of The Royal Society of Pathologists in 1997, and later a Fellow of the same Royal Society in 2004.

== Career ==
With his wife Sopsamorn and two other couples, Flavell started a children's leukaemia research charity, Leukaemia Busters.

His research is concerned with the development of the next generation of genetically engineered immunotoxins.
