= List of people from Nizhny Novgorod =

Coat of Arms of Nizhniy Novgorod

This is a list of notable people who have lived in Nizhny Novgorod (1932–1990: Gorky), Russia.

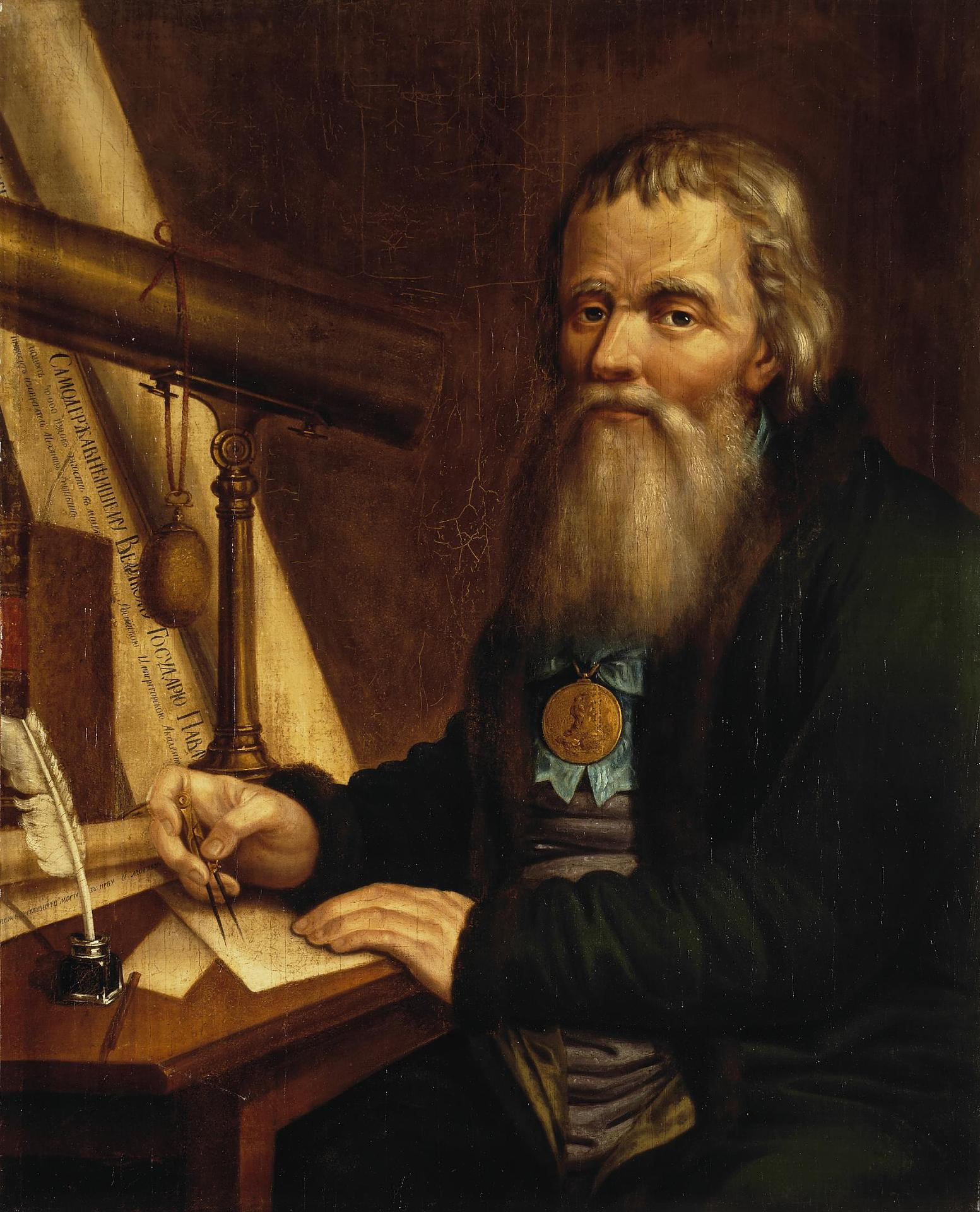
Ivan Kulibin (1735–1818)

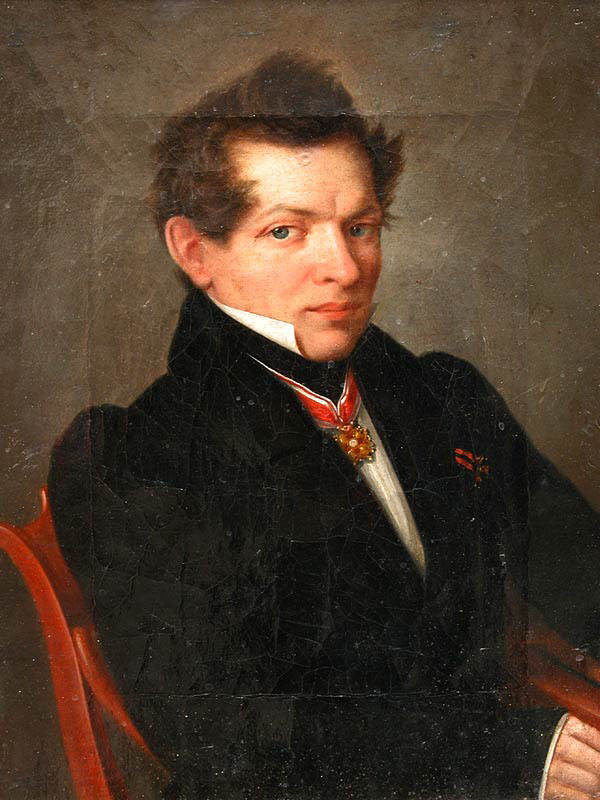
Nikolai Lobachevsky (1792–1856)

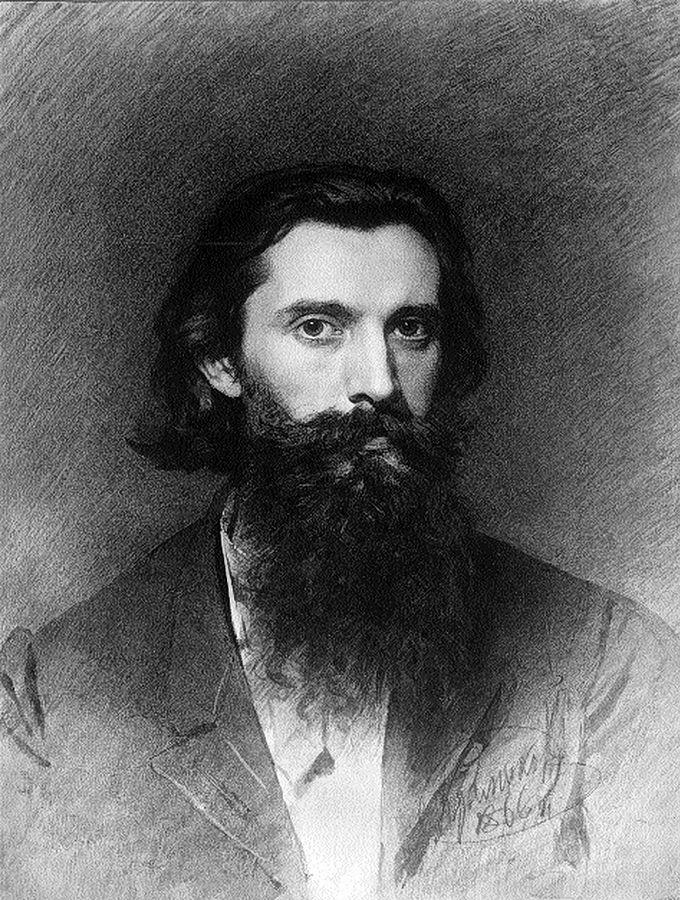
Nikolai Dmitriev-Orenburgsky (1838–1898)

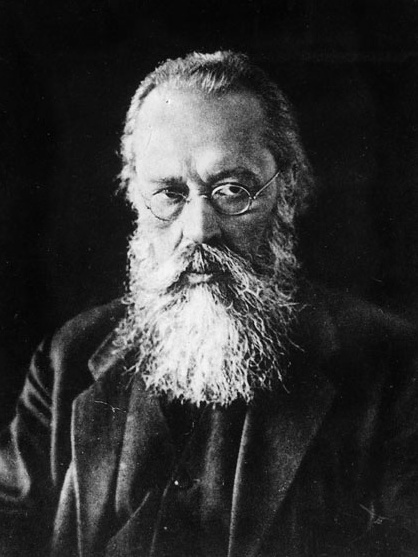
Vladimir Steklov (1864–1926)

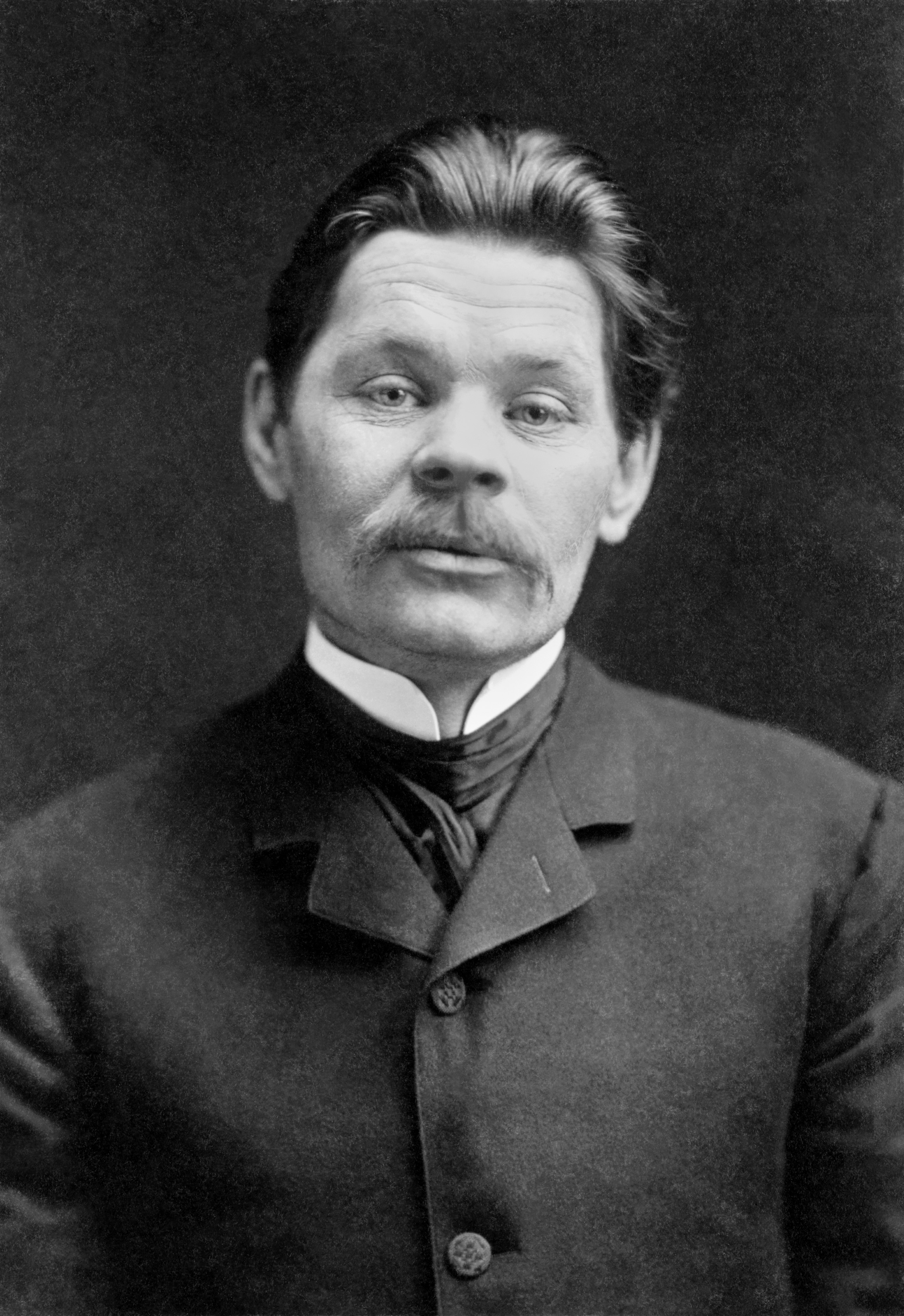
Maxim Gorky (1868–1936)

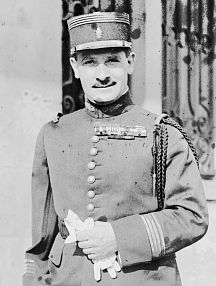
Zinovy Peshkov (1884–1966)

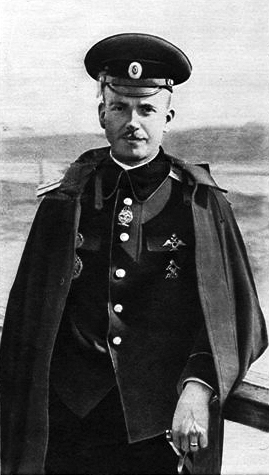
Pyotr Nesterov (1887–1914)

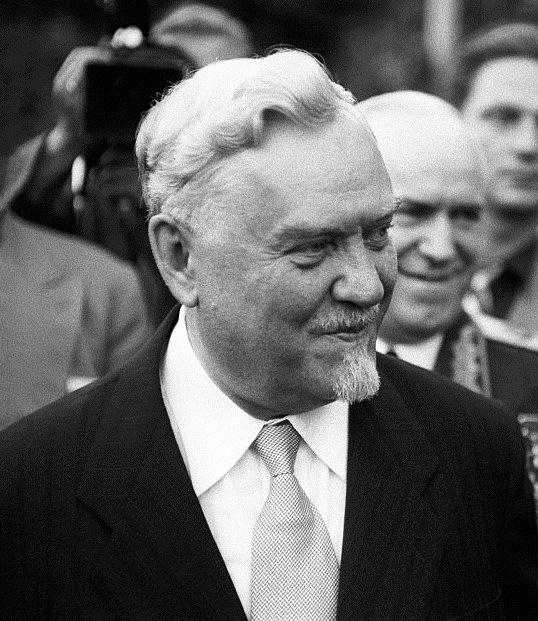
Nikolai Bulganin (1895–1975)

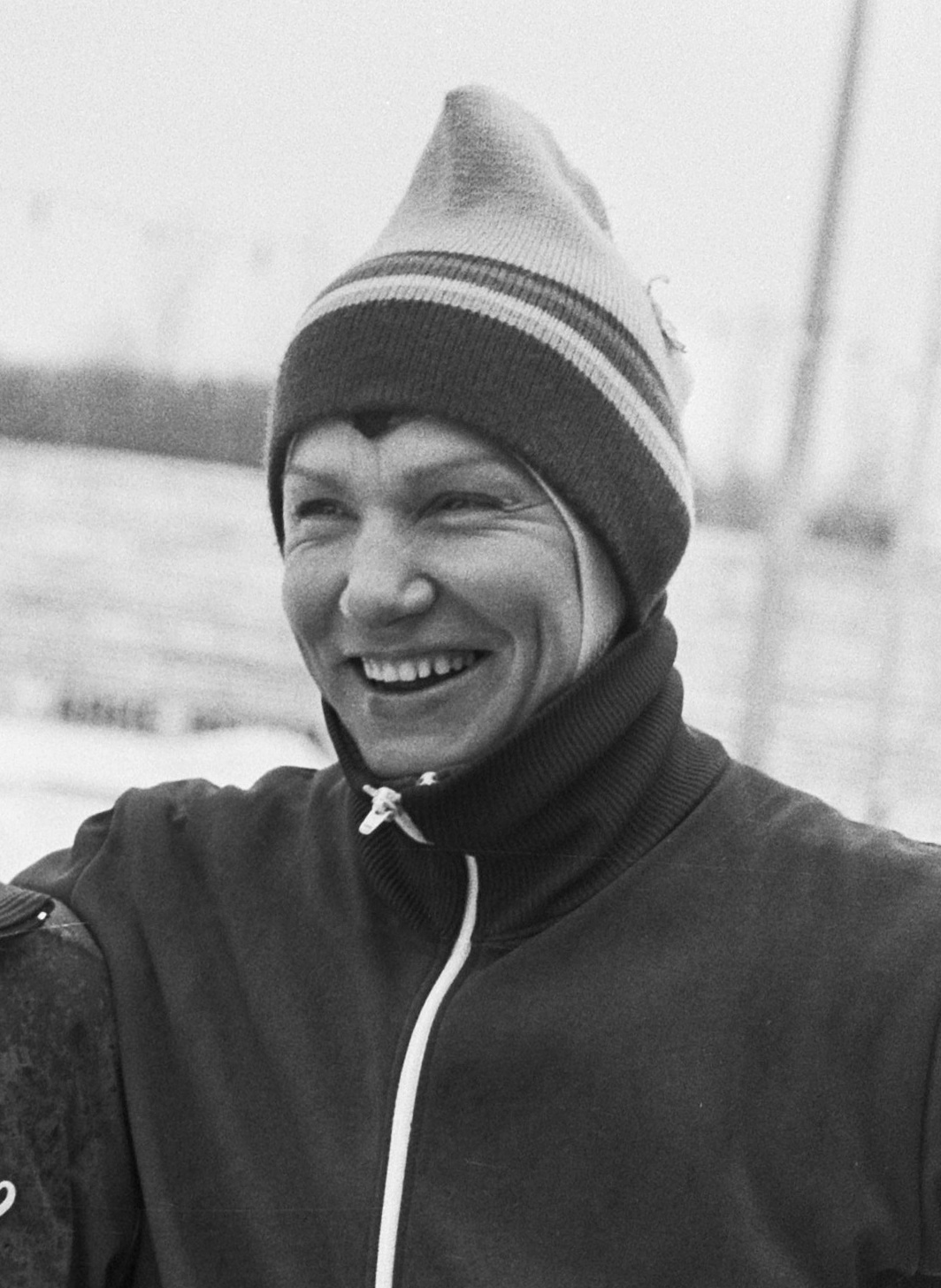
Tatyana Averina (1950–2001)

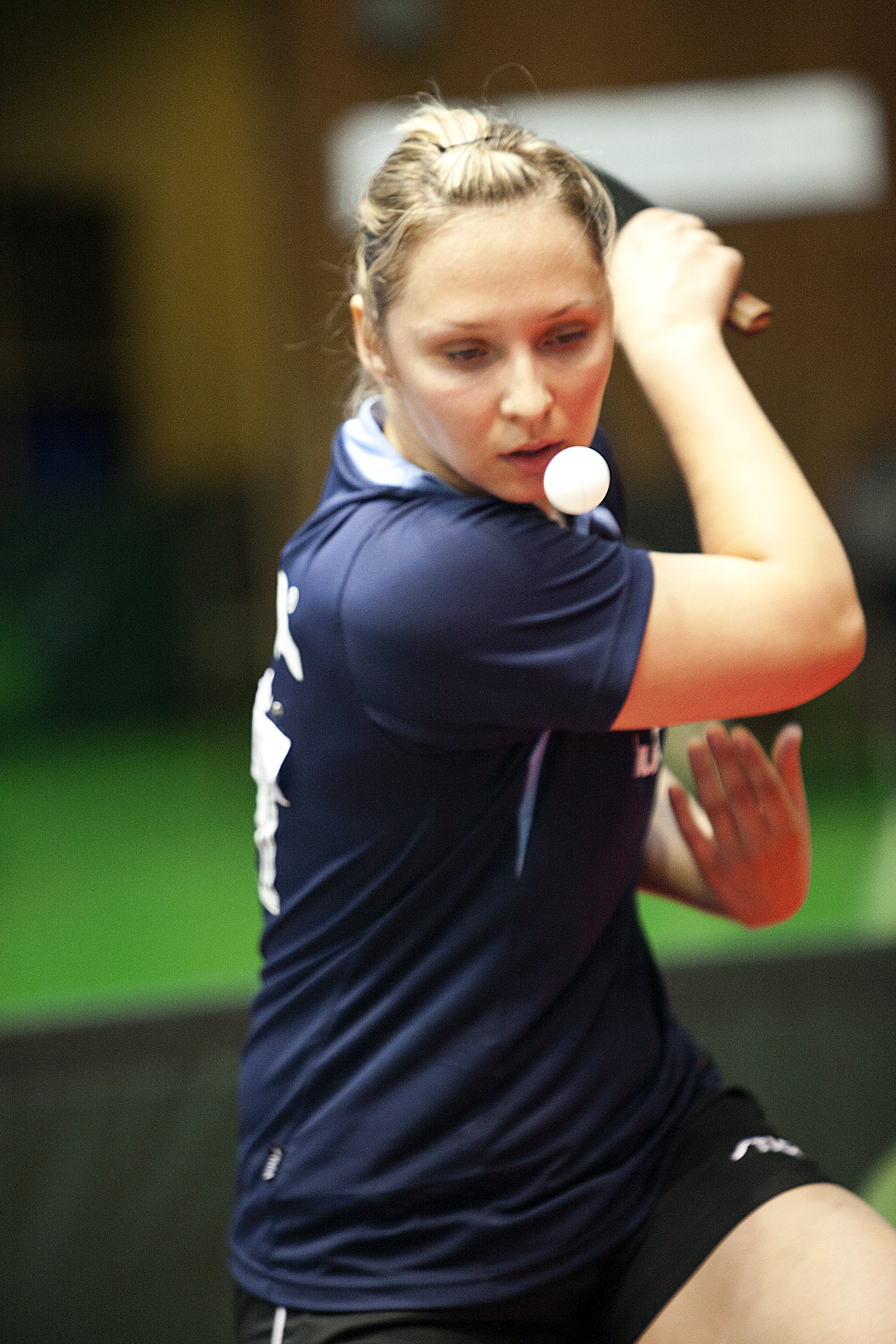
Svetlana Ganina (born 1978)

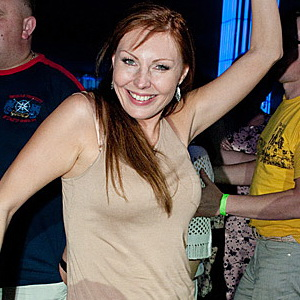
Natalya Bochkareva (born 1980)

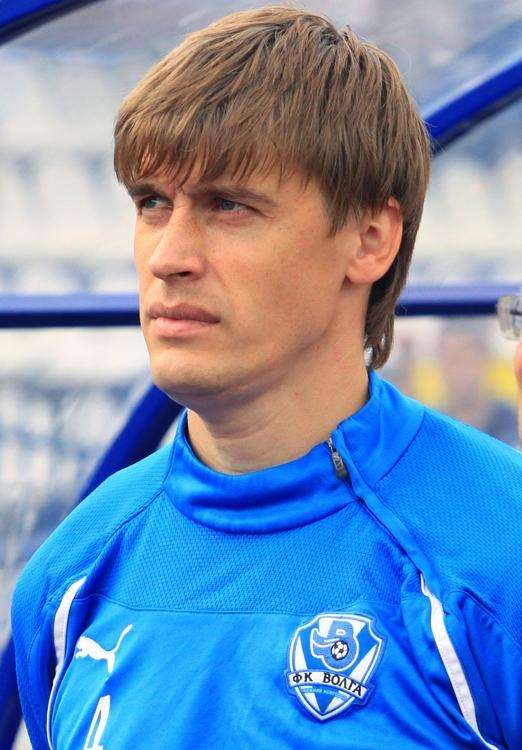
Dmitry Aydov (born 1982)

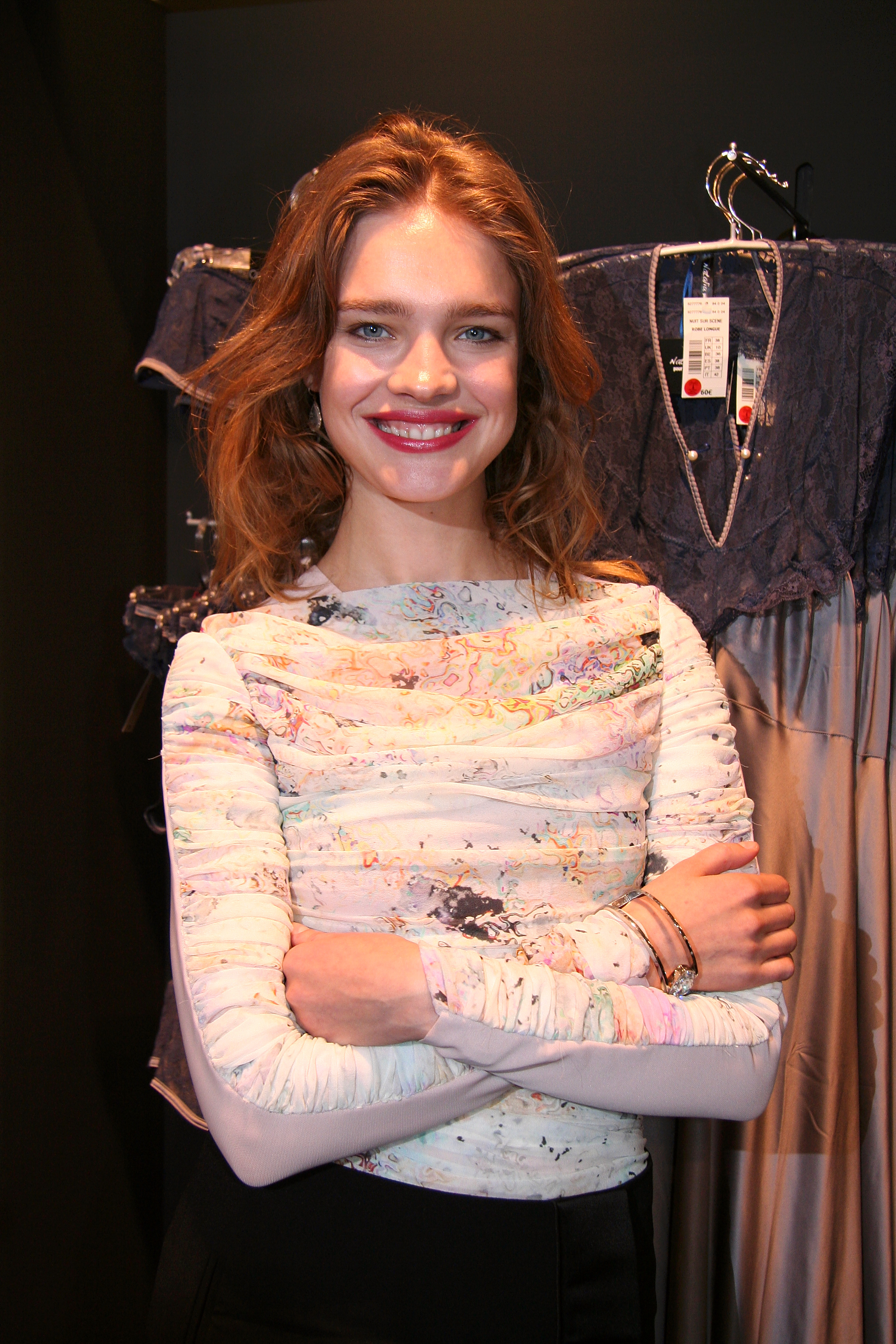
Natalia Vodianova (born 1982)

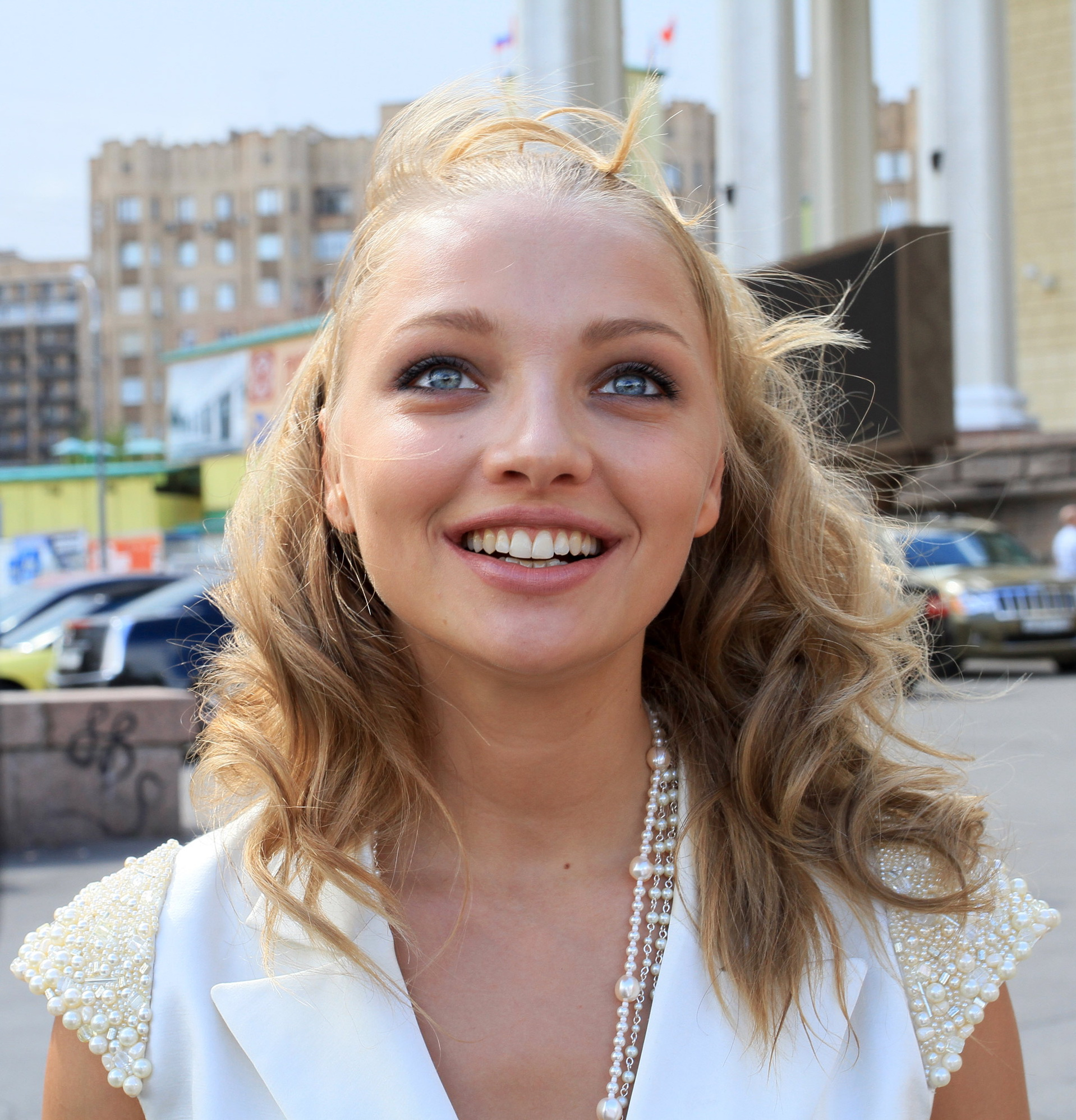
Ekaterina Vilkova (born 1984)

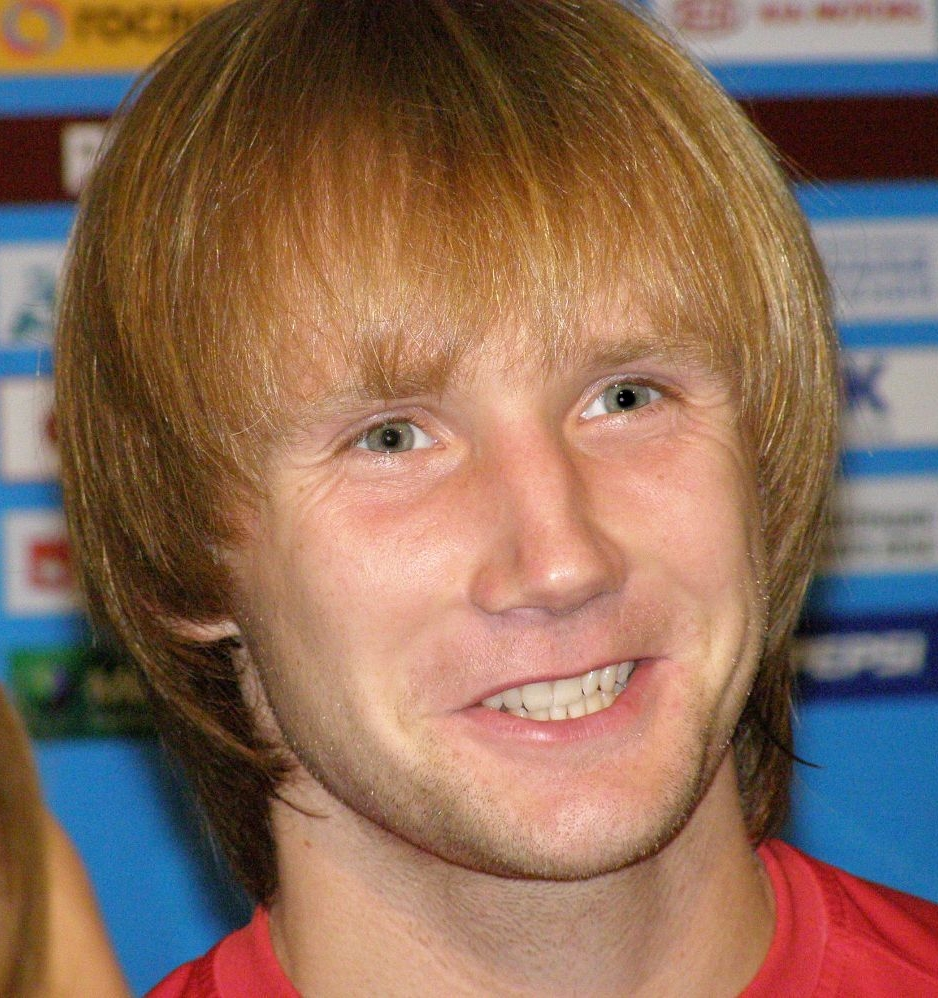
Nikolai Zhilyayev (born 1987)

== Born in Nizhny Novgorod ==
=== 1301–1800 ===
- Macarius of Unzha (1349–1444), Russian Orthodox saint
- Dmitry Pozharsky (1577–1642), Rurikid prince, led Russian forces against Polish invaders in 1611–1612 towards the end of the Time of Troubles
- Kuzma Minin (end of 16th century–1616), Russian National Hero of 1612
- Ivan Kulibin (1735–1818), mechanic and inventor
- Sergei Trubetskoy (1790–1860), one of the organizers of the Decembrist movement
- Nikolai Lobachevsky (1792–1856), mathematician and geometer

=== 1801–1850 ===
- Nikolai Martynov (1815–1875), army officer who fatally shot the poet Mikhail Lermontov in a duel on 27 July 1841
- Pavel Melnikov (1818–1883), writer, ethnographer
- Vasily Vasilyev (1818–1900), sinologist of the Victorian era
- Nikolay Dobrolyubov (1836–1861), literary critic, journalist, poet and revolutionary democrat
- Pyotr Boborykin (1836–1921), writer, playwright, and journalist
- Mily Balakirev (1837–1910), composer, head of The Five
- Nikolai Dmitriev-Orenburgsky (1838–1898), painter
- German Lopatin (1845–1918), revolutionary, journalist and writer
- Raphael von Koeber (1848–1923), German-Russian teacher of philosophy at the Tokyo Imperial University in Japan

=== 1851–1900 ===
- Mikhail Matyushin (1861–1934), painter and composer
- Constantin Kousnetzoff (1863–1936), painter
- Vladimir Steklov (1864–1926), mathematician, mechanician and physicist
- Anna Ulyanova (1864–1935), revolutionary and Soviet stateswoman
- Zdzisław Lubomirski (1865–1943), Polish aristocrat, landowner, lawyer, conservative politician and social activist
- Dmitriy Sirotkin (1865–1946), twice city head, millionaire
- Aleksandr Ulyanov (1866–1887), revolutionary and older brother of Vladimir Lenin
- Maxim Gorky (Alexei Maximovich Peshkov, 1868–1936), writer and political activist
- Ivan Bubnov (1872–1919), marine engineer and designer of submarines for the Imperial Russian Navy
- Dmitry Nadyozhny (1873–1945), commander in the Russian Imperial Army who later joined the Red Army
- Alexander Samoylovich (1880–1938), Orientalist-Turkologist
- Leonid Vesnin (1880–1933), leading light of Constructivist architecture
- Sergei Chetverikov (1880–1959), biologist and geneticist
- Mikhail Tetyaev (1882–1956), tectonic geologist
- Alexander Krein (1883–1951), composer
- Zinovy Peshkov (1884–1966), Russian-born French general and diplomat
- Yakov Sverdlov (1885–1919), Bolshevik party leader and chairman of the All-Russian Central Executive Committee
- Pyotr Nesterov (1887–1914), military pilot, aircraft technical designer and aerobatics pioneer
- Issay Dobrowen (1891–1953), Russian-Norwegian pianist, composer and conductor
- Nikolay Kolosovsky (1891–1954), economic geographer, economist
- Léon Zack (1892–1980), painter and sculptor
- Nikolai Bulganin (1895–1975), soviet political, Prime Minister (1955–1958), Marshal of the Soviet Union
- Catherine Doherty (1896–1985), Russian Canadian Roman Catholic social worker
- Anatoly Marienhof (1897–1962), poet, novelist and playwright
- Aleksandr Formozov (1899–1973), biologist and environmentalist

=== 1901–1930 ===
- Sergey Lebedev (1902–1974), scientist in the fields of electrical engineering and computer science, and designer of the first Soviet computers
- Vladimir Varankin (1902–1938), writer of literature in Esperanto, instructor of western European history
- Andrei Fayt (1903–1976), film actor
- Alexander Golovanov (1904–1975), pilot, Marshal of Aviation
- Nikolay Bogolyubov (1909–1992), theoretical physicist, mathematician
- Boris Mokrousov (1909–1968), composer
- Israel Borisovich Gusman (1917-2003), musical conductor
- David Ashkenazi (1915–1997), pianist, accompanist and composer
- Eugene Sokolov (1920–2008), neuroscientist
- Nikolai Khokhlov (1922–2007), KGB officer who defected to the United States in 1953
- Yevgeny Yevstigneyev (1926–1992), soviet actor
- Margarita Nazarova (1926–2005), actress, circus performer
- Yevgeniy Chazov (1929–2021), physician

=== 1931–1950 ===
- Igor Maslennikov (1931–2022), film director
- Valentin Morkovkin (1933–1999), rower
- Konstantin Kharchev (1934), politician, diplomat and ambassador
- Leonid Volkov (1934–1995), ice hockey player
- Igor Zhukov (1936–2018), pianist, conductor and sound engineer
- Vladimir Ashkenazy (1937), Russian-born pianist and conductor of Icelandic and Swiss citizenship
- Yuri Golov (1937–2014), Russian footballer
- German Sveshnikov (1937–2003), Soviet fencer
- Viktor Konovalenko (1938–1996), ice hockey goaltender
- Sergei Novikov (1938–2024), mathematician
- Mikhail Rabinovich (1941–2025), physicist
- Pavel Lednyov (1943–2010), modern pentathlete and Olympic champion
- Valeri Zykov (1944), football player
- Vladimir Denisov (1947), fencer
- Gariy Napalkov (1948), ski jumper
- Tatyana Averina (1950–2001), speed skater

=== 1951–1970 ===
- Sergey Mitin (1951), Governor of Novgorod Oblast since 2007
- Vladimir Kovin (1954), ice hockey player
- Alexander Skvortsov (1954–2020), ice hockey player
- Galina Kakovkina (1957), painter
- Serhii Plokhii (1957), professor of Ukrainian history at Harvard University
- Mikhail Varnakov (1957), ice hockey player
- Gennadi Maslyayev (1958), professional football coach and player
- Sergey Ryabtsev (1958), plays violin and provides backing vocals for the Gypsy punk band Gogol Bordello
- Tatyana Shvyganova (1960), field hockey player and Olympic medalist
- Evgeny Sheyko (1962–2020), conductor
- Yevgeny Erastov (1963), writer
- Valery Rozov (1964), BASE jumper
- Ilya Segalovich (1964–2013), co-founder of Russian search engine Yandex
- Andrey Sigle (1964), film producer, film music composer and musician
- Maya Usova (1964), ice dancer
- Natalia Pankova (1965), artist, art manager
- Dimitri Konyshev (1966), former road bicycle racer
- Anatoly Moskvin (1966), former linguist, philologist, historian, and serial body snatcher
- Alexander Baburin (1967), Russian-Irish Grandmaster of chess
- Igor Egorov (1968), football referee and former player
- Dmitri Cheryshev (1969), footballer
- Alexei Ivanov (1969), writer
- Vladimir Kurayev (1969), professional footballer
- Sergei Sorokin (1969), ice hockey player
- Valeri Popovitch (1970), football striker
- Alyaksandr Taykow (1970), footballer

=== 1971–1980 ===
- Vladislav Leontyev (1971), crime figure
- Dmitry Mazunov (1971), table tennis player
- Vladimir Kireyev (1972), football player
- Natalya Sadova (1972), discus thrower
- Aleksei Gerasimov (1973), professional footballer
- Andrej Krementschouk (1973), photographer
- Albert Oskolkov (1973), professional footballer
- Alexander Guskov (1976), professional ice hockey defenceman
- Sergei Nakariakov (1977), virtuoso trumpeter
- Svetlana Ganina (1978), table tennis player
- Evgeny Aleshin (1979), swimmer
- Pyotr Bystrov (1979), association footballer
- Artem Chubarov (1979), professional ice hockey player
- Natalya Bochkareva (1980), stage and film actress, television presenter
- Irina Kotikhina (1980), professional table tennis player

=== 1981–1990 ===
- Nikolay Kruglov Jr. (1981), biathlete
- Igor Yamushev (1981), former Russian professional football player
- Dmitry Aydov (1982), professional association football player
- Vladimir Gusev (1982), professional road racing cyclist
- Yekaterina Kondratyeva (1982), sprinter
- Natalia Vodianova (1982), supermodel, philanthropist and occasional film actress
- Ilya Korotkov (1983), javelin thrower
- Sergey Shiryayev (1983), cross country skier
- Ivan Usenko (1983), Belarusian ice hockey defenceman
- Mikhail Tyulyapkin (1984), professional ice hockey defenceman
- Ekaterina Vilkova (1984), actress of film, theater and television
- Dmitri Kosmachev (1985), professional ice hockey player
- Mikhail Varnakov (1985), professional ice hockey player
- Maria Borodakova (1986), volleyball player
- Denis Kornilov (1986), ski jumper
- Denis Kozhukhin (1986), pianist, winner of the Vendome Prize in Lisbon in 2009
- Svetlana Mironova (1986), orienteering competitor
- Vera Ulyakina (1986), volleyball player
- Anne Vyalitsyna (1986), supermodel
- Artem Lobov (1986), UFC Fighter
- Igor Levit (1987), Russian-German pianist
- Ilya Maksimov (1987), football midfielder
- Ruslan Zakharov (1987), short-track speed-skater
- Nikolai Zhilyayev (1987), footballer
- Vladimir Galuzin (1988), professional ice hockey player
- Valeri Zhukov (1988), professional ice hockey player
- Denis Cheryshev (1990), footballer, Valencia CF forward
- Pavel Karelin (1990–2011), ski jumper
- Dmitri Radchuk (1990), ice hockey player

=== 1991–2000 ===
- Dmitriy Kokarev (1991), swimmer
- Alexander Sharychenkov (1991), professional ice hockey goaltender
- Daniil Trifonov (1991), concert pianist and composer
- Dmitri Karasyov (1992), professional football player
- Ekaterina Pushkash (1992), ice dancer
- Mikhail Maksimochkin (1993), ski jumper
- Rustam Yatimov (1998), professional football player
- Danila Chechyotkin (2000), football player

=== 21st century ===
- Anton Yefremov (2003), football player
- Daniil Shedko (2003), activist
- Dariia Sergaeva (2004), rhythmic gymnast
- Mark Eydelshteyn (2002), actor

== Lived in Nizhny Novgorod ==
- Damaskin (Rudnev) (1737–1795), Russian Orthodox Church bishop
- Alexander Dubček (1921–1992), Czechoslovak politician, in Nizhny Novgorod 1933–1938
- Nikolay Kruglov (born 1950), biathlete
- Nina Makarova (1908–1976), composer
- Anatoly Moskvin (1968), academic and linguist; arrested in 2011 after the bodies of 26 mummified young women were discovered in his home
- Andrei Rumyantsev (born 1969), professional footballer
- Aleksandr Shchukin (1969–2000), professional footballer (1987–1993: FC Lokomotiv Gorky)
- Igor Shelushkov (born 1946), mental calculator; postgraduate at Gorki Polytechnic Institute (now Nizhny Novgorod State Technical University)

== Exiles to Nizhny Novgorod ==
As a closed city that was inaccessible to foreign observers, this was a city for internal exiles.

- Andrei Sakharov (1980–1989), eminent Soviet nuclear physicist, dissident and human rights activist, 1975 Nobel Peace Prize winner
- Egidio Gennari (?–?), Italian exile who left Italy in 1926 due to the repression of the Fascist government and lived in the city

== See also ==
- List of Russian people
- List of Russian-language poets
