= Zhitomirsky =

Zhitomirsky is a Ukrainian Jewish toponymic surname derived from the Polish surname Żytomirski, derived from the adjectival form for the city of Żytomierz (Zhytomyr).

Notable people with the surname include:

- Daniel Zhitomirsky (1906–1992), Russian musicologist
- Eugeniusz Żytomirski (1911–1975), Polish poet
- Ilya Zhitomirskiy (1989–2011), American software developer
- Jacob Zhitomirsky (1880–?), Russian secret agent
- Konstantin Israel Zhitomirsky (1863–1918), Yiddish scholar and pedagogue
- Viktor Zhitomirsky (1894–1945), Soviet-Tajikistani microbiologist
- Zinaida Zhitomirskaya (1918–1980), Soviet-American bibliographer
