= Zhitomirsky family =

Ukrainian Jewish family known as a "dynasty of academics"

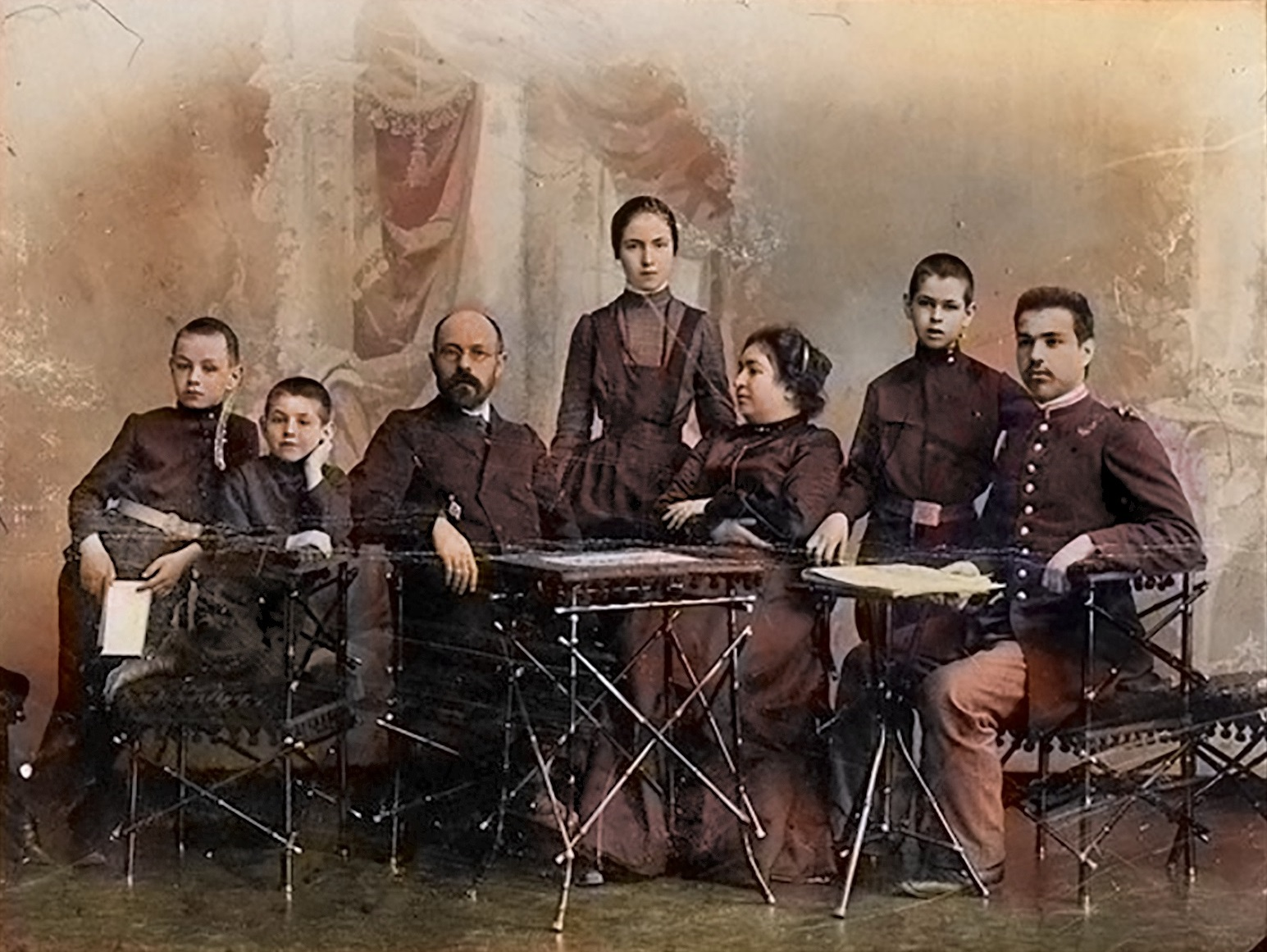
Konstantin Israel Zhitomirsky with his wife and children in Taganrog, 1903

The Zhitomirsky family (Yiddish: זשיטאָמירסקי) is a Jewish family originating from present-day Ukraine. The earliest known members of the family lived in Bakhmut and Mariupol. Their descendants moved to Taganrog, now part of Russia, where they became known as a "dynasty of academics" as many of them engaged in research.

== Tree of notable family members ==
- Hirsch Tzvi Zhitomirsky (1813–1874), Hebrew poet
  - Konstantin Israel Zhitomirsky (1863–1918), Yiddish scholar and pedagogue (son of Hirsch Tzvi)
    - Grigory Zhitomirsky (1888–1935), lawyer (son of Konstantin Israel)
      - Eugeniusz Żytomirski (1911–1975), Polish poet (son of Grigory)
    - Onufriy Zhitomirsky (1891–1942), mathematician (son of Konstantin Israel)
    - Viktor Zhitomirsky (1894–1954), Soviet-Tajikistani epidemiologist (son of Konstantin Israel)
      - Zinaida Zhitomirskaya (1918–1980), bibliographer and translator (daughter of Viktor)
        - Konstantin Erastov (1939–1996), linguist and translator (son of Zinaida)
  - Gitel Sinaiskaya (daughter of Hirsch Tzvi)
    - Viktor Sinaisky (1893–1968), Soviet sculptor (son of Gitel)

== Other notable relatives ==
Viktor Zhitomirsky's wife, Emilia Minukhina, was a niece of the Russian-Siwss Hebrew bibliographer Menahem Mendel Slatkine.

Viktor Zhitomirsky's grandson, Alexander Borun, is married to the Russian linguist Anna Dybo.

Konstantin Erastov's first wife, Tatiana Tankhilevich, was a daughter of the Soviet historian Olga Tankhilevich.
