= Erastov =

Erastov (feminine: Erastova) is a Russian surname. Notable people with the surname include:

- Konstantin Erastov (1939–1996), Soviet-American translator
- Yevgeny Erastov (born 1963), Russian author and poet
