= Zytomirski =

Zytomirski or Żytomirski (feminine: Zytomirska/Żytomirska, plural: Zytomirscy/Żytomirscy) is a Polish surname, derived from the adjectival form for the city of Żytomierz (Zhytomyr), and may refer to:

- Eugeniusz Żytomirski (1911–1975), Polish poet and author
- Henio Zytomirski (1933–1942), murder victim
- Shmuel Zytomirski (1900–1944), Lublin Jew

== See also ==
- Zhitomirsky
