= Vasily Baranshchikov =

Russian merchant and writer (c. 1755 – c. 1804)

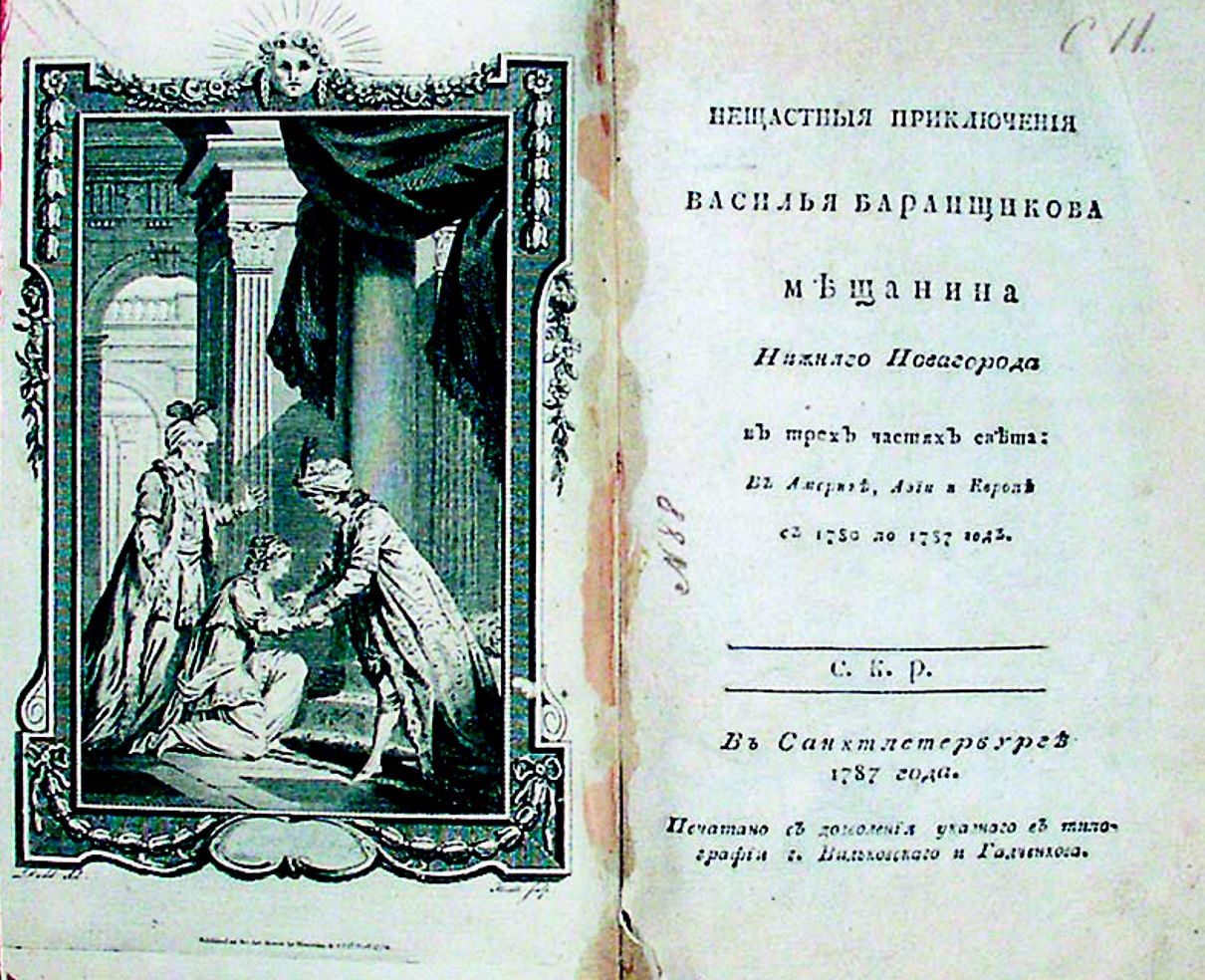
Frontispiece and title page of a printing of The Unfortunate Adventures of Vasily Baranshchikov, 1787

Vasily Yakovlevich Baranshchikov (Russian: Василий Яковлевич Баранщиков; 1755 or 1756 – after 1804) was a Russian merchant from Nizhny Novgorod who spent part of the 1780s as an adventurer in the Caribbean and the Mediterranean. In 1787 he published a short, highly successful travelogue, probably consisting of a mixture of fact and invention, which was reissued several times. His story was retold in an essay by Nikolai Leskov and a novel by Robert Shtilmark.

== Sources ==
Besides his travelogue, The Unfortunate Adventures of Vasily Baranshchikov, Burgher of Nizhny Novgorod, on Three Continents: in America, Asia and Europe from 1780 to 1787, Baranshchikov's story survives in the record of an interrogation by the local government of Nizhny Novgorod upon his return in March 1786, which was found and published in 1900. The two accounts are somewhat different, and moreover the events described in the travelogue do not fit in the allotted timeframe. Nonetheless, his tattoos, passports and knowledge of Spanish, Italian and Turkish demonstrated the truth of at least some of his account. The historian Alexei Vigasin, in his introduction to a scholarly edition of the Unfortunate Adventures, suggests a possible true sequence of events.

Before the discovery of the interrogation record, many observers argued that Baranshchikov was a fictional character; Pyotr Petrov believed the author of the Unfortunate Adventures to have been Fedor Karzhavin, another Russian who had spent time in the Caribbean, in spite of the fact that Karzhavin had not yet returned to Russia in 1787, the time of the book's publication, and had not been to the Middle East. Today, to what extent his travelogue (which is written in the third person) was ghostwritten and by whom remains a matter of speculation, as it already was upon publication. A lengthy appendix containing a description of contemporary Istanbul was probably not based on Baranshchikov's observations but on the same source as the Tsargrad letters attributed to Pavel Levashov.

== Biography ==
=== Early life and beginning of journey ===
In his March 1786 interrogation, Baranshchikov is stated to be 30 years old, meaning that he was born in 1755 or 1756. His parents, merchant Yakov Ignatiev Baranshchikov and Anna Petrova, died when he was a teenager; he and his two brothers were left to fend for themselves. By 1780, he had a wife and three children and was a member of the Second Merchant Guild of Nizhny Novgorod. That year, according to the Unfortunate Adventures, he set out for Rostov with a load of leather goods which he sold profitably at the local fair, however, he was robbed and all his money was taken, whereupon he sold his horses and traveled straight to Saint Petersburg to try to set right his finances. This episode is absent from the interrogation report; Vigasin suggests that Baranshchikov may not have wanted to mention his debts, which however were promptly remembered by his creditors.

In Saint Petersburg, Baranshchikov got hired as a sailor on a ship supplying logs to Bordeaux and Le Havre. He traveled as far as Copenhagen, where he was shanghaied by the Danish military.

=== Experiences in the Antilles ===
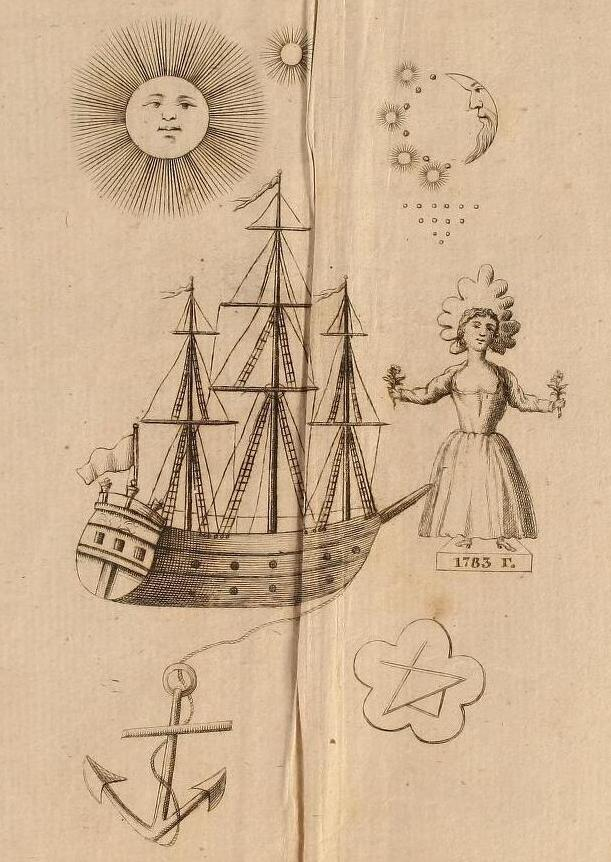
Frontispiece from Unfortunate Adventures depicting Baranshchikov's Puerto Rican tattoos

According to the book, he was first tricked into boarding a ship heading for Saint Thomas in the Danish West Indies, where he took part in military exercises. Due to Baranshchikov's difficulties in learning Danish (according to his book), or pretending not to understand it (according to the interrogation report), he was traded to Puerto Rico in exchange for two black slaves. Upon arriving, he was tattooed (Note: The process of tattooing is described in the travelogue, but called "branding") on the left arm and hand with nine devices including the year "1783". Baranshchikov spent over a year serving in the household of a "Spanish general" and learned to speak Spanish. After a conversation with the general's wife, he was released with a Spanish passport and got hired on an Italian ship headed to Genoa or Venice.

According to Vigasin, this narrative does not add up: the claim that Baranshchikov arrived in Puerto Rico in 1781 and served one master the whole time contradicts the number of tattoos and the inclusion of "1783" among them. Vigasin suggests that Baranshchikov may have wanted to forget certain aspects of his stay in Puerto Rico.

=== Experiences in the Mediterranean ===
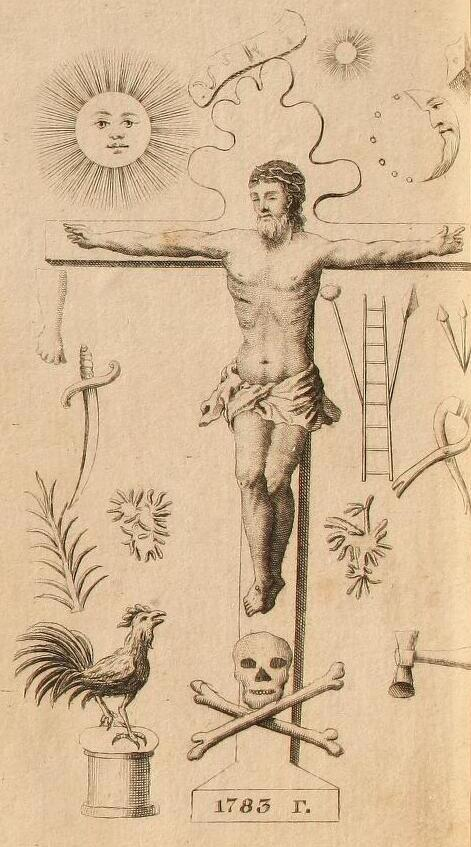
Frontispiece from Unfortunate Adventures possibly depicting Baranshchikov's Jerusalem tattoos

At this point the two narratives diverge significantly.

According to the interrogation report, Baranshchikov arrived in Venice and worked odd jobs there for three years before getting hired as a sailor on a ship bound for Jaffa. From Jaffa he and the rest of the ship's crew performed a pilgrimage to Jerusalem, where he received further tattoos including the crucifixion and a sun. Finally, back in Jaffa, instead of boarding the same ship back for Venice, Baranshchikov got himself hired on a Greek ship heading for Constantinople. He spent 10 weeks there before heading back to Russia over land.

According to the Unfortunate Adventures, the ship was attacked off the coast of Morocco by Barbary pirates who captured Baranshchikov and forcibly converted him to Islam, giving him the name Islam. Baranshchikov was then enslaved by the pirate captain and taken to his home in Bethlehem (depicted as a port in the narrative). There he was forced to brew coffee up to 15 times a day and entertained the captain, his four wives, and his houseguests with feats of gluttony and patriotic speeches about Russia. Upon his second attempt, he managed to escape and left on a Greek ship which took him to Jaffa, detoured for a pilgrimage to Jerusalem, where he received the pilgrim's tattoos as evidence of his reconversion to Christianity, and then went to Venice. There, he received a Venetian passport and boarded the same ship to Constantinople via Smyrna. However, the captain who allowed him to escape slavery left him in Constantinople without a penny. When Baranshchikov went to the Russian embassy for help, he was rebuffed: "there are many vagrants like you, and you all say it is out of necessity that you turned Turkish." Eventually, he met a Russian convert to Islam named Gusman who cajoled him into a new venture: with the help of a corrupt imam, Baranshchikov would pretend to be a new Muslim convert and gather alms. This way they gathered a significant sum and split it, however, Baranshchikov had to prove his faith by marrying Gusman's sister-in-law. While his new life was comfortable, Baranshchikov had to perform Muslim piety under his new wife and father-in-law's watchful eyes. He was also missing home, shocked by the cruelty of Ottoman law, and under pressure to marry a second wife. When, on the eve of Ramadan, Baranshchikov's father-in-law dressed him in his best outfit to receive a bonus from the Grand Vizier, after receiving the bonus, Baranshchikov did not return home, but traded his father-in-law's Turkish outfit for a Greek one and set out over land for Russia.

Among modern readers, Maltseva argues that the whole Turkish subplot is a novelistic interpolation. Vigasin takes a more subtle view. He proposes that the pirate attack and subsequent enslavement is a fabrication, given its lack of detail, geographical absurdities, and the impossibility of fitting it within the required timeline. On the other hand, given Baranshchikov's knowledge of Turkish, it is likely that he spent significant time in Constantinople. In this case, Baranshchikov probably described his itinerary accurately during the interrogation, while minimizing his stay in Constantinople to avoid questions about his conversion to Islam. On the other hand, for the book, he concocted the enslavement episode in order to convince his audience that the conversion had been forced while also entertaining them with mostly true details of his stay in Constantinople.

=== Return to Russia ===
Baranshchikov claimed he traveled on foot from Constantinople via Shumla to Ruschuk on the Danube. There, he said, he stayed some time with local Cossacks before moving on via Bucharest, Focșani and Iași, crossing the Polish border at Soroca. Passing through Ladyzhyn and Bila Tserkva, forced to beg for money along the way, he finally crossed into the Russian Empire at Vasylkiv by November 1785.

After an interrogation in Kiev, Baranshchikov was sent back to Nizhny Novgorod. There, the book states, he discovered that his family was living in poverty and one of his children had died, but his creditors had not forgotten him and demanded their money back with interest, as well as six years of guild membership payments. Baranshchikov was forced to sell his house and was sentenced to work off the rest at the saltworks in the nearby city of Balakhna, which would have taken at least 8 years. The intervention of local bishop Damaskin allowed him to travel to Saint Petersburg to raise funds, where he published his travelogue.

=== Later life ===
After using the royalties from his book to pay off his debts, Baranshchikov returned to Nizhny Novgorod and became a merchant once again. In 1801–1804, he was delegated by the tailors' guild to Nizhny Novgorod's city duma (parliament).

== Appraisal and legacy ==
Readers have found Baranshchikov to be a colorful figure, perhaps a victim of circumstances, but variously uneducated, greedy, lazy, ungrateful, opportunistic, and dishonest. His travelogue is generally agreed to have limited literary and historical value, its descriptions of places limited to quotidian details like the taste and preparation of bananas.

The Unfortunate Adventures were an 18th-century bestseller for a few years, as they provided a glimpse of exotic places and fit into a popular genre of "misfortune" literature, although a review from the time describes them as sloppily written and the author as an ungrateful whiner. By the beginning of the 19th century they were forgotten with the appearance of better-written and more erudite travelogues by figures such as Karamzin and Pushkin.

Baranshchikov's name appeared again in the 1890s, when Leskov wrote a polemic essay for the magazine Severny Vestnik in which he summarized Baranshchikov's exploits to compare them to those of a contemporary adventurer, Nikolai Ashinov. Leskov painted both as scoundrels who sought and, incomprehensibly, received patronage from high places ahead of law-abiding citizens. In the same era, Baranshchikov is mentioned in several encyclopedias.

In the Soviet era, Baranshchikov's adventures were novelized by Robert Shtilmark under the title Tale of a Russian Wanderer (Russian: Повесть о страннике российском). In his author's preface, Shtilmark describes Baranshchikov as an unsophisticated man, with a coarse sense of humor and a touch of cunning, but gifted with curiosity and an ability to accept foreign customs without prejudice.

Baranshchikov and his travelogue have been studied by academics in the context of other travel literature of the time as well as the local history of Nizhny Novgorod.

== See also ==
- Afanasy Nikitin, a 15th-century Russian merchant and traveler who lived as a Muslim in India

== Sources ==
- "Баранщиков, Василий" . Brockhaus and Efron Encyclopedic Dictionary (in Russian). 1906.
