= Konstantin Erastov =

- Born: 8 February 1939; Moscow, USSR
- Died: 21 January 1996 (aged 56); New York City, US
- Occupation: translator

Konstantin Erastov (1939–1996) was a Soviet intellectual, linguist and translator primarily known for his Moscow salon, a center for dissident life and independent arts.

== Early life ==
Erastov's mother, Zinaida Zhitomirskaya, was a native of Dnipro, Ukraine, and a member of the Zhitomirsky family, a Jewish "dynasty of academics" from Taganrog. She named her son after her grandfather Konstantin Israel Zhitomirsky, a Yiddish scholar and pedagogue. Konstantin Erastov's father, Oleg Erastov, was a lecturer at the Moscow Planetarium.

Konstantin was born in Moscow but spent his childhood in Dushanbe, Tajikistan, where his grandfather Viktor Zhitomirsky worked as an epidemiologist. After returning to Moscow, he studied linguistics. In 1960, he joined the USSR's first machine translation lab at Moscow State Linguistic University as a researcher. He wrote several papers on early methods of machine translation and translated a number of works by Joseph Greenberg and other Western linguists for the Soviet journal The New in Foreign Linguistics.

== The Erastovs' house in Moscow ==
In the 1960s and 1970s, Konstantin Erastov, his first wife Tatiana Tankhilevich (Milman) and their seven children lived in a historic building on Bolshoy Gnezdnikovsky Lane in downtown Moscow. Their house was an important gathering point for Soviet dissidents and independent artists of their generation. The Erastovs' house has been featured in several tourist guides and local history books as an unusually late example of salon culture which was largely wiped out by the Bolsheviks.

A detailed description of the Erastovs' house and its notable frequenters such as the Soviet human rights activist and political prisoner Victor Krasin was written by the Russian linguist Georgy Lesskis.

In 1960, Gennadiy Aygi, another frequent guest of the Erastovs' house, dedicated his poem House of Friends to Konstantin Erastov and his wife Tatiana.

In 2010, Moscow-based XL gallery hosted an exhibition by Igor Makarevich featuring photos of and objects from the Erastovs' salon with a special focus on the emigration of the Erastov family to the United States in 1978.
