= Peter Hermann Stillmark =

Russian-born Estonian-Swedish microbiologist (1860–1923)

- Stillmark in 1888
- Born: 22 July 1860; Penza, Russian Empire
- Died: 23 June 1923 (aged 62); Pärnu, Estonia
- Known for: Discovery of ricin, Lectins
- Scientific career
- Thesis: Über Ricin, ein giftiges Ferment aus den Samen von Ricinus comm. L. und einigen anderen Euphorbiaceen (1888)
- Doctoral advisor: Rudolf Kobert

Peter Hermann Stillmark (22 July 1860 – 23 June 1923) was a Russian-born Estonian-Swedish microbiologist and physician known for his discovery of the castor seed toxin ricin, as well as its broader category of carbohydrate-binding proteins now know as lectins.

== Early life ==
Stillmark was born 22 July 1860 in Penza, Russian Empire, the second of four children born to Barthold Stillmark, an Estonian-Swedish physician and either his first (Luise Willert) or second (Emma Bach) wife. His father had relocated from Dorpat (now Tartu), Estonia to the Penza Governorate in Imperial Russia to work as a provincial physician. He had an older brother Edmund (1840–1887), and two younger brothers Alexander (1865–1889) and Friedrich Wilhelm (1870–1943).

== Education and discovery of ricin ==
Stillmark returned to Tartu at some point prior to the early 1880s when he enrolled at Imperial University of Dorpat, now the University of Tartu. His PhD advisor was the German toxicologist Rudolf Kobert, under whom he completed his doctoral thesis which contained the first chemical description and isolation of ricin, a ribosome-poisoning toxin from castor seeds. Caston seed extract (including ricin and other compounds) strongly coagulates red blood cells, making it a hemagglutinin. This led to the assumption for many decades that Stillmark's compound was responsible for this as well as the extreme toxicity. However, it is actually a separate compound in ricin seeds (Ricinus communis agglutinin or RCA) which creates the vast majority of the agglutinizing effect, while ricin creates the extreme cytotoxicity by interfering with ribosome activity. Nevertheless, ricin is still a weak hemagglutinin and coagulates red cells, by binding the glycosylated carbohydrates on red cells (i.e., glycoproteins), which Stillmark observed. Thus, it remains the first lectin discovered as well as the first definition of that category of cell-adhesion molecules, and a major step in the development of glycobiology.

== Legacy ==
In 1988, the University of Tartu established the Stillmark Medal in Lectin Research to commemorate the centennial of Stillmark's discovery. It was awarded to Samuel H. Barondes in September 1988 at the 12th meeting of the International Lectin Society (Interlec-12) in Davis, California for his pioneering studies of the multiple biological functions of galectins, a large family of lectins found in many animals, including humans. The following year it was awarded to the plant glycobiologist Marilynn Etzler, a former President of the Society for Glycobiology and editor of the first open access textbook, Essentials of Glycobiology.

== Family ==
Stillmark married his second cousin once removed, Elisa Olga Julie Stillmark, the two having shared a great-grandfather Mikael Stillmark. The couple had two sons, Hermann Robert Alexander Stillmark (1895-1914) and Werner Barthold Maximilian Stillmark (1889-1941), a career educator and director of the Association of German Societies in Estonia from 1930 to 1936.

=== In Russia ===
Like his father Barthold, another branch of the family immigrated to the Russian interior and adopted a Russified surname, "Shtilmark", beginning with Stillmark's second cousin once removed, Bruno-Alexander Aleksandrovich Shtilmark, a chemical engineer He studied at the Imperial University of Moscow (now Moscow State University), before entering a decorated military service from 1906 until 1916, when the Imperial Russian Army was dissolved by the new Soviet state. After this, he worked in chemical engineering in Moscow. In 1938 he was accused and convicted of espionage for Nazi Germany by the NKVD. He executed in the same year, at the NKVD mass execution site of Butovo, near Drozhzhino in Moscow Oblast.

Bruno-Alexander's son was the Russian-born author and journalist Robert Shtilmark, who wrote the pirate adventure novel The Heir from Calcutta while imprisoned in a Soviet gulag in Krasnoyarsk Krai from 1945 to 1953 for "counter-revolutionary agitation". The novel was suggested to Shtilmark by a fellow inmate in Yenisei Corrective Labor Camp, a workcrew manager named Vasily Pavlovich Vasilevsky. Vasilevsky hoped to publish the book under both men's names and send it to Stalin to secure their clemency, as the Soviet leader was known to be a fan of adventure novels. He offered to trade Shtilmark his grueling construction duties on the Salekhard–Igarka Railway by assigning him instead to the bath house, and providing him materials to write. Shtilmark accepted the deal and the book was later published after his release, under both mens names despite the publishers request for Vasilevsky to be removed. It was alleged that Vasilevsky tried to have him murdered once Shtilmark was back in Moscow.
