= Rudolf Kobert =

German pharmacologist and toxicologist

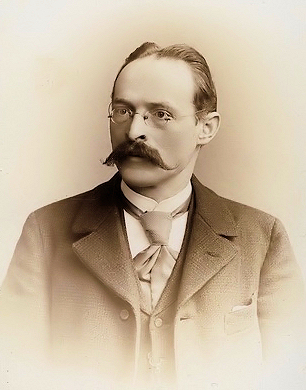
Rudolf Kobert (1854-1918)

Rudolf Kobert (3 January 1854 – 27 December 1918) was a German pharmacologist and toxicologist born in Bitterfeld.

In 1877 he graduated from the University of Halle, afterwards working as an assistant to physiologist Friedrich Goltz (1834-1902) and pharmacologist Oswald Schmiedeberg (1838–1920) at the University of Strasbourg. In 1887 he was appointed professor of pharmacology, dietetics and history of medicine at the Imperial University of Dorpat. One of his students was Peter Hermann Stillmark who was the founder of lectinology with the publication of his thesis about ricin.

Due to "Russification" of the university, Kobert left Dorpat in 1896, subsequently becoming director of the Brehmerschen Heilanstalten (a sanatorium founded decades earlier by Hermann Brehmer) in Gorbersdorf. In 1899 he was appointed to the chair of pharmacology, pharmacognosy, chemistry and physiological history of medicine at the University of Rostock, a position he kept until his death.

Kobert's work largely involved investigations of ergot alkaloids, scopolamine, saponins and various plant and animal poisons. He was the author of popular textbooks, and was especially known for his release of Historischen Studien aus dem Pharmakologischen Institut der Universität Dorpat (Historical studies in the Institute of Pharmacology at the University of Dorpat; 5 volumes 1889–96).

== Selected writings ==
- Beiträge zur Terpentinölwirkung . [s.l.] 1877 Digital edition by the University and State Library Düsseldorf
- Compendium der praktischen Toxikologie zum Gebrauche für praktische Ärtze und Studierende, 1894 - Compendium of practical toxicology and numerous other particulars for physicians and students.
- "Practical toxicology for physicians and students"; translated and edited by Ludwig Heinrich Friedburg. New York, W. R. Jenkins (1897)
- Görbersdorfer Veröffentlichungen, 1898 - Görbersdorf publications.
- Beiträge zur Kenntnis der Saponinsubstanzen für Naturforscher, Ärzte, Medizinalbeamte, 1904 Digital edition by the University and State Library Düsseldorf
- Lehrbuch der intoxikationen, 1902-06 - Textbook of intoxications. Digital edition by the University and State Library Düsseldorf
- Lehrbuch der pharmakotherapie, 1906, - Textbook of pharmacotherapy.
- Einige Notizen über die Bedeutung und den biologischen Nachweis von vegetabilischen Agglutininen und Hämolysinen, 1909 Digital edition by the University and State Library Düsseldorf
- Über Amanita phalloides, [1911] Digital edition by the University and State Library Düsseldorf
- Beiträge zur Kenntnis der vegetabilischen Hämagglutinine : eine auf Veranlassung der Königl. Bayerischen Akademie der Wissenschaften ausgeführte und durch Verleihung des Liebigstipendiums unterstützte Experimentaluntersuchung, Vol. 1–2, 1913 Digital edition by the University and State Library Düsseldorf
- Kleine Mitteilungen, 1916 Digital edition by the University and State Library Düsseldorf
- Über kieselsäurehaltige Heilmittel, insonderheit bei Tuberkulose, 2nd ed. 1918 Digital edition by the University and State Library Düsseldorf
- Aus der Geschichte der Tollkirsche und der Pupillenerweiterung durch Gifte, 1920 Digital edition by the University and State Library Düsseldorf
