= Zinaida Zhitomirskaya =

Soviet-American librarian and bibliographer

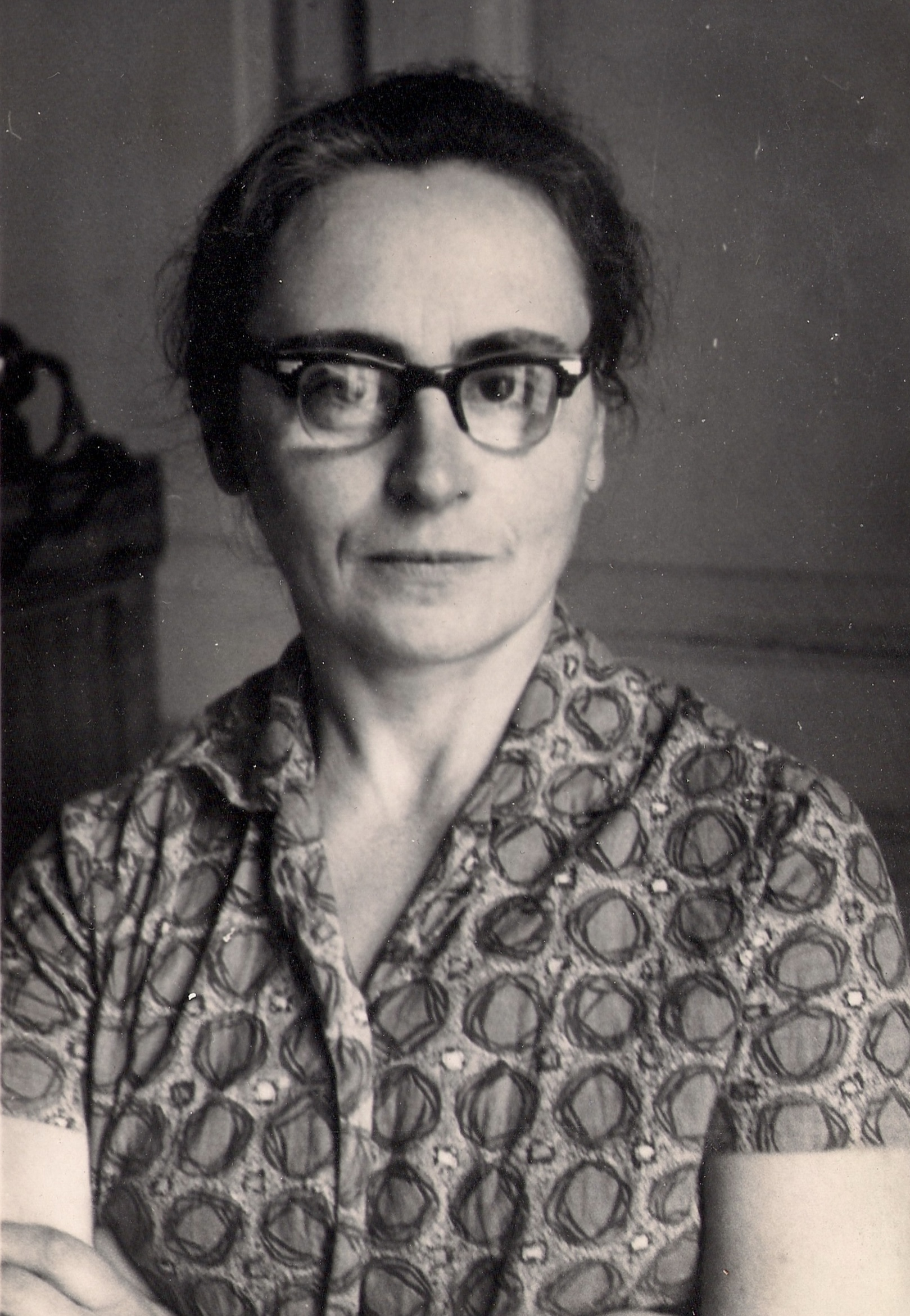
- Born: 26 November 1918; Dnipro, Ukrainian State
- Died: 1 March 1980 (aged 61); New York City, US
- Occupations: librarian, bibliographer

Zinaida Zhitomirskaya (1918–1980) was a Soviet librarian, translator and bibliographer who researched German literature.

== Biography ==
Zinaida Zhitomirskaya was born in a Jewish family in Dnipro, modern-day Ukraine. In the 1920s, she moved to Moscow with her parents. She studied Germanic languages at the Moscow Institute for Philosophy, Literature and History which was later merged with the Moscow State University.

In the 1930s, Zhitomirskaya married Oleg Erastov who worked as a lecturer at the Moscow Planetarium. Soon after the birth of her only child, Konstantin Erastov, Zhitomirskaya moved to Dushanbe, Tajikistan, where her father worked as a microbiologist.

After returning to Moscow in 1944, she started working at the All-Union Library for Foreign Literatures. Her work at the library included compiling bibliographic indexes and reference books on the works of German authors as well as the Russian translations of their books and critical responses to them. She has also translated a number of adventure books from English into Russian.

In 1978, she emigrated from the USSR to the United States with her son Konstantin.

== Family ==
Zinaida's father Viktor Zhitomirsky, a native of Taganrog, was a son of the renowned Yiddish scholar and pedagogue Konstantin Israel Zhitomirsky. He studied medicine in Kharkiv and took part in the Russian Civil War as a military physician. Later, he became one of the first microbiologists in Tajikistan and helped prevent the spread of epidemics in the region during World War II. Zinaida was named after her late paternal grandmother, Konstantin's wife, Tzina Zhitomirskaya (née Vikteshmayer). The Zhitomirsky and Vikteshmayer families had been living in Taganrog for generations.

Zinaida's mother, Emilia Zhitomirskaya (née Minukhina), was born in Dnipro. Her father, Zelman Minukhin, was a merchant and a scholar at the Ohel Mattityahu synagogue. Emilia's maternal grandfather, Moisei Zlatkin, was a rabbi in Rostov-on-Don and father to the early Hebrew bibliographer Menahem Mendel Slatkine.

== Publications ==
=== Reference books ===
- Житомирская, З. В. (1964). Э. Т. А. Гофман: библиография русских переводов и критической литературы на русском языке. Москва: Всесоюзная государственная библиотека иностранной литературы.
- Житомирская, З. В. (1972). Иоганн Вольфганг Гете: Библиографический указатель русских переводов и критической литературы на русском языке. Москва: Всесоюзная государственная библиотека иностранной литературы.
- Житомирская, З. В. (1976). Стефан Цвейг. Биобиблиографический указатель. Москва: Всесоюзная государственная библиотека иностранной литературы.

=== Translations ===
- Kent, R. (1965). В диком краю (Дневник мирных приключений на Аляске) [Wilderness: A Journal of Quiet Adventure in Alaska. Russian translation by Zinaida Zhitomirskaya]. Москва: Мысль.
- Stevenson, F.; Stevenson, R. L. (1969). Жизнь на Самоа [Our Samoan Adventure. Russian translation by Zinaida Zhitomirskaya]. Москва: Мысль.
