= Robert Shtilmark =

Soviet writer (1909–1985)

Robert Alexandrovich Shtilmark
- Born: April 3, 1909; Moscow, Russian Empire
- Died: September 30, 1985 (aged 76); Moscow, Russian SFSR, Soviet Union
- Citizenship: Soviet Union
- Occupation: Writer
- Writing career
- Language: Russian
- Notable awards: Order of the Patriotic War; Order of the Red Star; Medal "For Courage"; Medal "For the Defence of Leningrad"

Robert Aleksandrovich Shtilmark (Russian: Роберт Александрович Штильмарк; April 3, 1909 – September 30, 1985) was a Russian-born writer and journalist of Estonian-Swedish descent. He was known as the author of the adventure novel The Heir From Calcutta.

== Biography ==
Shtilmark was born 3 April 1909 in Moscow, to the family of Tartu-born chemical engineer Bruno-Alexander Aleksandrovich Shtilmark, who immigrated from Estonia to the Russian Empire for work. The family were Estonian-Swedes, and Shtilmark was a second counsin once removed of the Estonian-Swedish microbiologist and discoverer of ricin, Peter Hermann Stillmark. In 1929, he graduated from the Higher Literary and Art Institute Named After Valery Bryusov. In the same year, he married Evgenia Belago. Evgenia was an expert on Japanese economics, and in the early 1920s she worked in Japan with her first husband, a diplomat. Soon they had a son, Felix, a future ecologist and conservation biologist.

A 1938 mugshot of Shtilmark's father, Bruno-Alexander Alexandrovich Shtilmark, prior to his execution by the NKVD in the same year.

Shtilmark worked as an assistant and head of the department of the Scandinavian countries in the All–Union Society of Cultural Relations with Abroad. Subsequently, he was an international journalist in the newspaper Izvestia, in the Telegraph Agency of the Soviet Union, worked as an editor in the magazines "Foreign Literature", "Young Guard".

He published a collection of his poems and a book of essays "Draining the Sea" (1932). In 1937, he joined the Department of Foreign Languages at the Valerian Kuibyshev Military Academy, as a researcher and teacher. The following year, his father was executed by the NKVD at the Butovo execution site, near Drozhzhino, after being accused of espionage for his native Germany.

=== During the war ===
During the Great Patriotic War, he was the assistant commander of a reconnaissance company. He was wounded in the battles near Leningrad. In 1942, after a serious injury and concussion, he was sent as a teacher to the Tashkent Infantry School, then transferred to Moscow, taught at the Higher Command Courses of the Workers' and Peasants' Red Army. In 1943, he graduated from the Leningrad Red Banner Military Topographic School, was a senior teacher of military topography. With the rank of captain, he served in the Military Topographic Directorate of the General Staff.

For military services he received awards:

- Order of the Patriotic War, 1st Class;
- Order of the Red Star;
- Medal "For Courage";
- Medal "For the Defence of Leningrad".

In 1944, his wife died.

=== Arrest and imprisonment ===
In April 1945, Shtilmark was arrested on charges of "counter–revolutionary agitation" and sentenced to 10 years in prison.

He was arrested a month before the end of the war, during the war he worked in the editorial and publishing department of the General Staff, a military officer who fought under besieged Leningrad was convicted (under Article 58–10) "for chatter": he named a building in Moscow "matchbox", did not approve of the demolition of the Sukharev Tower and the Red Gate and the renaming of old cities, and so on.

Was sent to the Yenisei Correctional Labour Camp; here he worked as a topographer, then as head of the literary part of the camp theater. Shtilmark sat in the 33rd, 25th and 10th columns near Janov Stan. Released in 1953, he first settled in Yeniseisk. Fully rehabilitated in 1955, then he lived in Moscow.

=== The Heir From Calcutta ===
Shtilmark is the author of the pirate adventure novel The Heir from Calcutta, written while he was imprisoned in a Soviet gulag in Krasnoyarsk Krai from 1945 to 1953 for "counter-revolutionary agitation". The novel was suggested to Shtilmark by a fellow inmate in Yenisei Corrective Labor Camp, a workcrew manager named Vasily Pavlovich Vasilevsky. Vasilevsky hoped to publish the book under both men's names and send it to Stalin to secure their clemency, as the Soviet leader was known to be a fan of adventure novels. He offered to trade Shtilmark his grueling construction duties on the Salekhard–Igarka Railway by assigning him instead to the bath house, and providing him materials to write. Shtilmark accepted the deal and the book was later published after his release, under both mens names despite the publishers request for Vasilevsky to be removed.

Work on the creation of the novel took a year and two months; it was completed on July 15, 1951. While Shtilmark was writing the novel, Vasilevsky needed him. When the novel was finished, Vasilevsky decided to eliminate Shtilmark to appropriate the authorship. Vasilevsky turned to professional killers. By a lucky coincidence, the murder did not take place: the bed on which Shtilmark was supposed to lie was torn apart at night, torn to pieces, the blanket was punctured in several places, and the pillow was cut with an ax. A second attempt on his life did not take place, since at that moment the fate of the writer brought Shtilmark to the criminal, and in the future by the famous writer Mikhail Demin, who, using his authority among the thieves, warned Vasilevsky not to touch Shtilmark again. Demin described the details of the failed murder in his autobiographical novel Thug.

Vasilevsky signed the text with two surnames – his own and Shtilmark, and sent the novel to Moscow, the writer's son. In Moscow, the manuscript was lost, and only after a long search did Shtilmark manage to find it.

The novel has received rave reviews from several well–known writers, including Ivan Efremov. It was first published in 1958 by the Children's State Publishing House (in the Library of Adventures and Science Fiction series) and immediately went through several reprints (in Irkutsk, Alma–Ata).

In 1959, Vasilevsky, also released under an amnesty, tried to sue himself half of the fees, but it turned out that Shtilmark had prudently embedded a cipher text into one of the chapters of the novel, proving his authorship.

A new wave of interest in the novel came during 1989 to 1993.

=== Last years ===
From 1970 to 1981, Shtilmark worked on his autobiographical chronicle A Handful of Light, part of which was first published in his four–volume collected works in 2001. Shtilmark, despite the lack of money and great ability to work, treated everything that came out of his pen with high exactingness, as a result of which most of his plans were not completed and remained either in drafts or in the memory of the audience (Shtilmark was recognized as an excellent storyteller): novels "The Gem of Feroniera", "Koptevskiy Gentleman", stories about the artists Pavel Korin and Mikhail Nesterov. Stories "The Feat of Love" (about Vladimir Dal) and "The Winged Prisoner" (another name: "The Fighter Seeks Battle"; about the honored pilot Vyacheslav Valentey who escaped from Nazi captivity), as well as an extensive epistolary legacy remained unpublished.

In the late 1970s, Shtilmark married Alexandra Shtilmark, née Zernova. In this marriage, a daughter, Maria Shtilmark, and a son, Alexander Shtilmark, were born.

Robert Shtilmark died on September 30, 1985. He was buried at the Vvedenskoye Cemetery (section 14).

== Bibliography ==
- Robert Shtilmark (1932). Drainage of the Sea (Holland). Moscow: Young Guard.
- Robert Shtilmark. Heir From Calcutta – Moscow: Children's State Publishing House, 1958 – 840 Pages
- Robert Shtilmark. The Story of the Russian Wanderer (based on a memoir by Vasily Baranshchikov) – Moscow: State Publishing House of Geographical Literature, 1962 – 240 Pages
- Robert Shtilmark (1967). Images of Russia. Sergei Pozharsky (artist). Moscow: Young Guard.
- Robert Shtilmark. Passenger on the Last Flight – Moscow: Young Guard, 1974
- Robert Shtilmark. The Ringing Bell of Russia: Herzen. Pages of Life – Moscow, 1976
- Robert Shtilmark. Beyond the Moscow River: Alexander Ostrovsky. Pages of Life – Moscow, 1983
- Robert Shtilmark (2001). A Handful of Light. Chronicle Novel in Two Parts. Moscow: Terra – Book Club. ISBN 5-275-00278-5.

== Sources ==
- Robert Shtilmark. "And Here I Am Sitting in the Turukhansk Territory" in the Magazine "Polar Horizons", No. 3, 1990
- Felix Shtilmark (1993). "A Small Detective Story About a Big Novel". Robert Shtilmark. Heir From Calcutta. Adventure Novel Library. Nizhny Novgorod: Volgo–Vyatka Book Publishing House. pp. 5–12. ISBN 5-74200554-7. Biography of the Author and His Main Book.
