= Dmitri Radchuk =

Russian ice hockey player

- Born: 26 May 1990 (age 35) Nizhny Novgorod, Russia
- Height: 6 ft 2 in (188 cm)
- Weight: 190 lb (86 kg; 13 st 8 lb)
- Position: Right wing
- Shoots: Left
- KHL team: Torpedo Nizhny Novgorod
- NHL draft: Undrafted
- Playing career: 2009–present

Dmitri Radchuk (born 26 May 1990) is a Russian ice hockey player. He is currently playing with Torpedo Nizhny Novgorod of the Kontinental Hockey League (KHL).

Radchuk made his Kontinental Hockey League (KHL) debut playing with Torpedo Nizhny Novgorod during the 2009–10 KHL season.
