= Natalia Pankova =

Russian painter

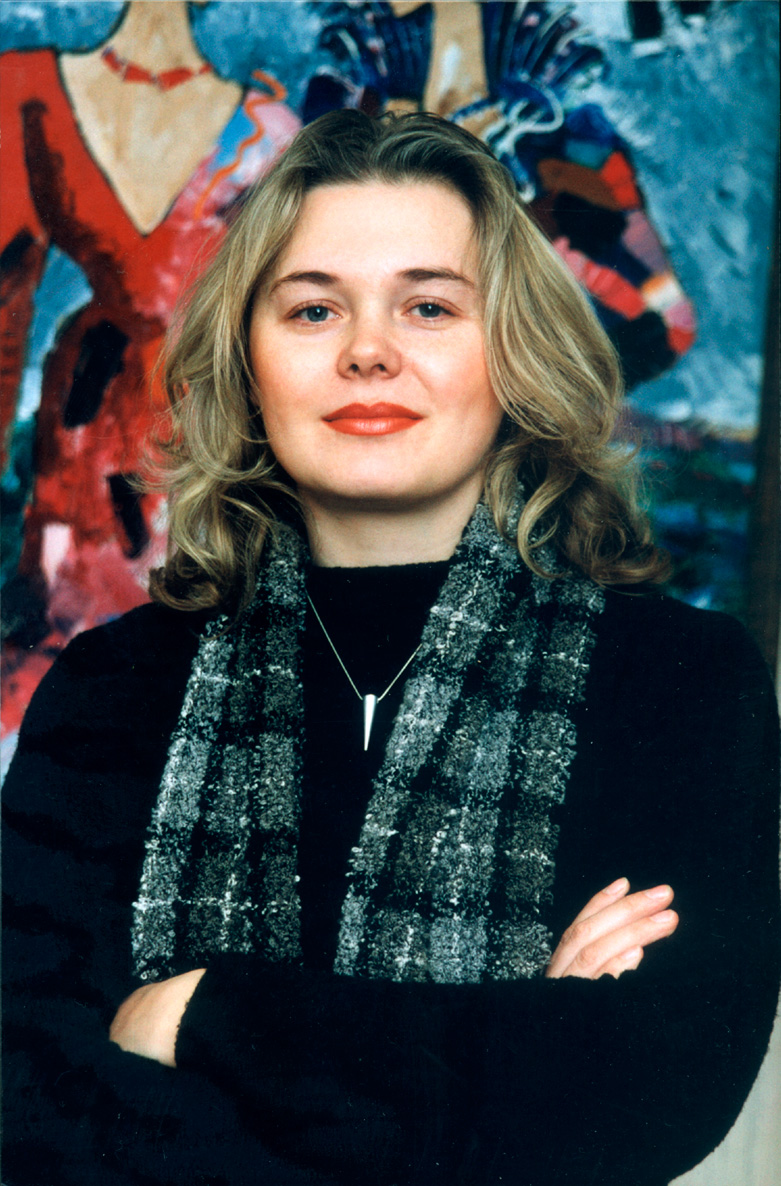
- Born: 28 June 1965 (age 59); Gorky, Russian SFSR, Soviet Union
- Known for: Painting

Natalia Yurievna Pankova (Russian: Наталия Юрьевна Панкова; born 28 June 1965, Nizhny Novgorod) is a Russian artist, art manager, member of the Russian Union of Artists, chairperson of the Executive Committee of the Nizhny Novgorod, Russian Art Foundation, and Counselor to the Representative of the Ministry of Foreign Affairs of Russia in Nizhny Novgorod, Master of Arts.

== Biography ==
Natalia Pankova was born in the city of Gorky (now known as Nizhny Novgorod) in 1965. She was educated at the Gorky Art School and the Moscow External University of the Humanities.

Since 1988, she has held exhibitions in Moscow and Nizhny Novgorod and participated in international projects in Spain, Luxembourg, Great Britain, Austria, Hungary, and Algeria. She has shown personal exhibitions in Moscow (Central Artist's House, Institute of Arts Studies, State Duma and others), Nizhny Novgorod (Nizhny Novgorod State Museum of Fine Arts, Nizhny Novgorod Exhibition Centre and others), Samara, Saransk, Cheboksary, Sarov, and internationally in Luxembourg, London, Vienna, Budapest, Algiers, Annaba, and Constantina.

== Achievements ==
- 1995 – Journey to Paris on an engagement from French Prime Minister Alain Juppe, followed by a trip to Spain where she was invited by a private gallery and worked for a few months on her Spanish Series project in Barcelona.
- A joint Russian-British art project called Conversion. Pankova was the manager and participator of the event held in Great Britain in 1998–2000 and sponsored by the Russian Embassy in the United Kingdom and the UK Ministry of Defence. A number of art exhibitions were held in London within the framework of the project.
- 2002 — Visit to Algeria on an engagement from the Algerian Ministry of Culture.
- 2003 — Participation in an art conference in Caux, Switzerland.
- 2001–2004 — Manager of the «High Tension» artistic project hosted by the Nizhny Novgorod State Museum of Fine Arts and the Nizhny Novgorod Exhibition Center, which united more than 50 artists.
- 2004–2006 — Personal exhibitions «Philosophy of Color» in Russian museums: the Nizhny Novgorod State Museum of Fine Arts, the Mordovia State Museum of Fine Arts, the Chuvashia State Fine Arts Museum.
- 2007–2008 — Color and Rhythm personal exhibitions in Vienna and Budapest.
- 2008 — Rhythm of Summer personal exhibitions in Helsinki and Tampere. Finland.
- 2008, 2009 — Participation at the Dorotheum Auction in Vienna, Austria.
- 2009 — Exhibition of artists from six countries, Beijing World Art Museum

== See also ==
- List of Russian artists
