= Monokov =

Russian internet activist (born 2003)

Daniil Andreyevich Shedko (Russian: Даниил Андреевич Шедько; born 21 June 2003), better known as Monokov, is a Russian internet activist.

== Biography ==
Daniil Shedko was born in Nizhny Novgorod, Russia, on June 21, 2003, At the age of six, he went to Italy, since his parents decided to move to the peninsula, precisely to San Ginesio. After attending schools in the Italian municipality, precisely to the Comprehensive Institute "Vincenzo Tortoreto", and working as a mechanic in the afternoon, in 2022 he began to publish his activities on the major social networks, Facebook, Instagram and TikTok, simultaneously cultivating a passion for cycling. As he published, the idea was to leave for a trip to European capitals in a bicycle, only to change due to tensions between Russia and Ukraine.

Since 6 March 2022, since the beginning of the Russian-Ukrainian war, he decided to travel Europe with his bike to try to fight Russophobia and spread a message of peace. Its mission, also supported by the Polish actress Kasia Smutniak, has reached and involved numerous European states, such as Slovenia, Croatia, Hungary, Slovakia, Austria, the Czech Republic, Germany, Poland, Lithuania, Latvia and Estonia. Condemned by the Russian authorities, according to Russian Law, can no longer return to his native country, as he would risk 15 years in prison.

Its mission is called "Navalny Project" (Italian: Progetto Navalny), name inspired by Putin's greatest political opponent, Alexei Navalny. Hosted and supported by the populations where he goes, he is accompanied by the white-blue-white flag, banned in Russia because it is the symbol of the protests against the war. In addition, it is accompanied by slogans "NO WAR", "RUSSIAN ARE NOT PUTIN" and "NO RUSSO PHOBIA". Interviewed by numerous newspapers and televisions, Monokov admits that during his trip he often came across Russophobic attitudes. As he himself admits on the social Instagram, during his mission he was arrested twice.

The initial plan was to end the journey by entering Russia and evading the guards. His mind then changed after some Belarusian refugees explained to him what happened to those who were against the political ideas of the government. The final destination is simply the Russian border.

Monokov today no longer engages in activism, in entering all his activities into online trading and coaching.
