= Andrej Krementschouk =

Andrej Krementschouk (Russian: Андрей Кременчук, Andrei Krementschuk; born 2 May 1973 in Gorki, Soviet Union) is a photographer who is based in Leipzig. His first book, No Direction Home, received several awards and international attention.

== Works ==
- 2008–2011 Zone Chernobyl
- 2005–2007 No Direction Home
- 2006–2010 Come Bury Me

== Bibliography ==
=== Books by Krementschouk ===
- No Direction Home. Heidelberg: Kehrer, 2009. ISBN 978-3-86828-056-2. With text by Krementschouk and Boris Mikhailov. (in German, English, and Russian)
- Come Bury Me. Heidelberg: Kehrer, 2010. ISBN 978-3-86828-120-0. (in English)
- Chernobyl Zone I, Kehrer, 2011. ISBN 978-3-86828-200-9
- Chernobyl Zone II, Author: Wolfgang Kil, Esther Ruelfs, Andrej Krementschouk, Kehrer Verlag, 2011. ISBN 978-3-86828-210-8 (in German and English)

=== Books with contributions by Krementschouk ===
- Die Stadt. Vom Werden und Vergehen / The City. Becoming and Decaying. Ostfildern: Hatje Cantz Verlag, 2010. ISBN 978-3-7757-2659-7. (in German and English)

== Exhibitions ==
=== Solo exhibitions ===
- 2009 — "No Direction Home", Filipp Rosbach Galerie (Leipzig); Galerie Clara Maria Sels (Düsseldorf)
- 2009 — "Krementschouk Andrej, Photographie", Kunstverein Recklinghausen (Recklinghausen)
- 2011 — »Heimat – Chernobyl«, Galerie Clara Maria Sels (Düsseldorf)
- 2011 — »Zone Heimat. Chernobyl«, Reiss-Engelhorn-Museen, ZEPHYR – Raum für Fotografie / C4.9b, (Mannheim)
- 2011 — »No Direction Home«, in Studio im Hochhaus – Kunst und Literaturwerkstatt, Berlin
- 2011 — «No Direction Home», Blue Sky, the Oregon Center for the Photographic Arts, Portland USA

=== Group exhibitions ===
- 2008 — "Friction and Conflict", Kalmar Konstmuseum (Kalmar)
- 2008 — "Russische Variationen", Painting and Photography. Drostei, Pinneberg bei Hamburg
- 2008 — "Good prospects: Young German photography 2007—2008", Martin-Gropius-Bau (Berlin); Deichtorhallen (Hamburg)
- 2010 — "The City. Becoming and Decaying", C/O Berlin, International Forum For Visual Dialogues, Berlin; Bayrischen Versicherungskammer (Munich)
- 2010 – FotoDoks 2010 – Documentary Photofestival, Munich
- 2010 – F/STOP 4. Internationales Fotografiefestival, Leipzig
- 2011 — "The City. Becoming and Decaying", Lindenau-Museum, Altenburg
- 2011 — "The Street of Enthusiasts", exhibition by Heinrich-Böll-Stiftung and Morat Institute, Berlin, Kiew, Warschau, Gartow, Freiburg, Hamburg, Brussel

== Awards / Grants ==
- 2010 PDN Photo Annual 2010 — «No Direction Home»
- 2009 Deutscher Fotobuchpreis 2010 silver prize winner, No Direction Home
- 2007–2008 No Direction Home at "Gute Aussichten – junge deutsche Fotografie" ("Good prospects: Young German photography") 2007–2008
