= Igor Yamushev =

Russian footballer

Personal information
- Full name: Igor Yuryevich Yamushev
- Date of birth: 21 August 1981 (age 45)
- Place of birth: Gorky, Russian SFSR
- Height: 1.89 m (6 ft 2 1/2 in)
- Position: Defender

Youth career
- FC Lokomotiv Nizhny Novgorod

Senior career*
Years	Team	Apps	(Gls)
1999–2001	FC Torpedo-Viktoriya Nizhny Novgorod	46	(4)
2001–2005	FC Energetik Uren	102	(3)
2006–2007	FC Alnas Almetyevsk	31	(1)
2008	FC SOYUZ-Gazprom Izhevsk	27	(2)
2009	FC Rotor Volgograd	12	(1)
2009	FC Zvezda Serpukhov	5	(0)
2010	FC Metallurg Vyksa (amateur)		
2011–2013	FC Spartak Bogorodsk		
- * Club domestic league appearances and goals

Igor Yuryevich Yamushev (Russian: Игорь Юрьевич Ямушев; born 21 August 1981) is a former Russian professional football player.

== Club career ==
He played in the Russian Football National League for FC Torpedo-Viktoriya Nizhny Novgorod in 1999.

== See also ==
- Football in Russia
