= Menahem Mendel Slatkine =

Russian-Swiss bibliographer (1875–1965)

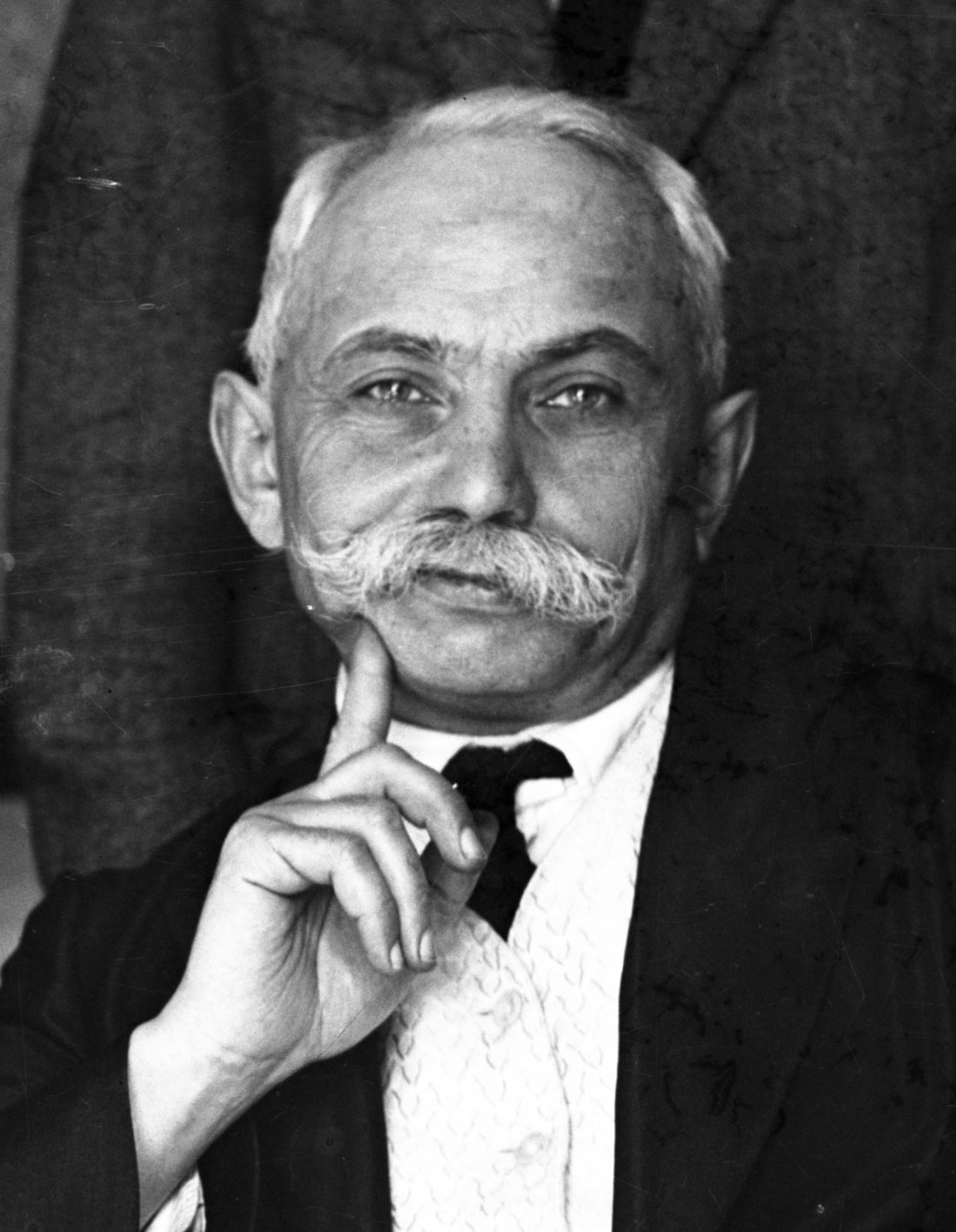
- Born: 1875; Rostov-on-Don, Russian Empire
- Died: 1965 (aged 89–90); Geneva, Switzerland
- Education: Volozhin Yeshiva
- Occupation: Bibliographer

Menahem Mendel Slatkine (1875–1965) was a Russian-Swiss Hebrew bibliographer and the founder of the Slatkine publishing house in Geneva.

== Early life ==
Menahem Mendel Slatkine was born in Rostov-on-Don, close to the modern-day Russia–Ukraine border. His father, Moisei Zlatkin, was a rabbi at the city's main synagogue and a member of the local society for the study and promotion of the Hebrew language. His mother, Emilia (Etke) Spitznadel, was born in Ludza, modern-day Latvia. He studied at the Volozhin Yeshiva.

== Work ==
After finishing his studies, Slatkine returned to Rostov-on-Don and started a marine insurance business. In 1903, he published his first article on Hebrew bibliography in the Russian-Jewish daily newspaper HaMelitz. In 1905, he moved to Geneva, Switzerland, fleeing pogroms. There he opened a bookstore and, later, a publishing house which operates to this day under the name Slatkine and is owned by his descendants.

While living in Geneva, he continued his bibliographical research and wrote several books, including Shemot ha-Sefarim ha-Ivrim on titles of Hebrew books and Bikkurei ha-Bibliografyah ba-Safrut ha-Ivrit on Shabbethai Bass, the first Hebrew bibliographer. He also published Mi-Sefer ha-Zikhronot shel Rav Litai, featuring "selected chapters" from the "memoirs" of Lithuanian rabbis, which some believe to be a mystification entirely written by Slatkine himself.

== Family ==
Menahem Mendel's great-grandson, Ivan Slatkine, was a member of the Grand Council of Geneva and the head of the Federation of Romande Enterprises. He is currently a co-owner of the Slatkine publishing house and bookstore.

Zinaida Zhitomirskaya, also a bibliographer, was Slatkine's great-niece.
