= Yevgeny Erastov =

Russian author and poet

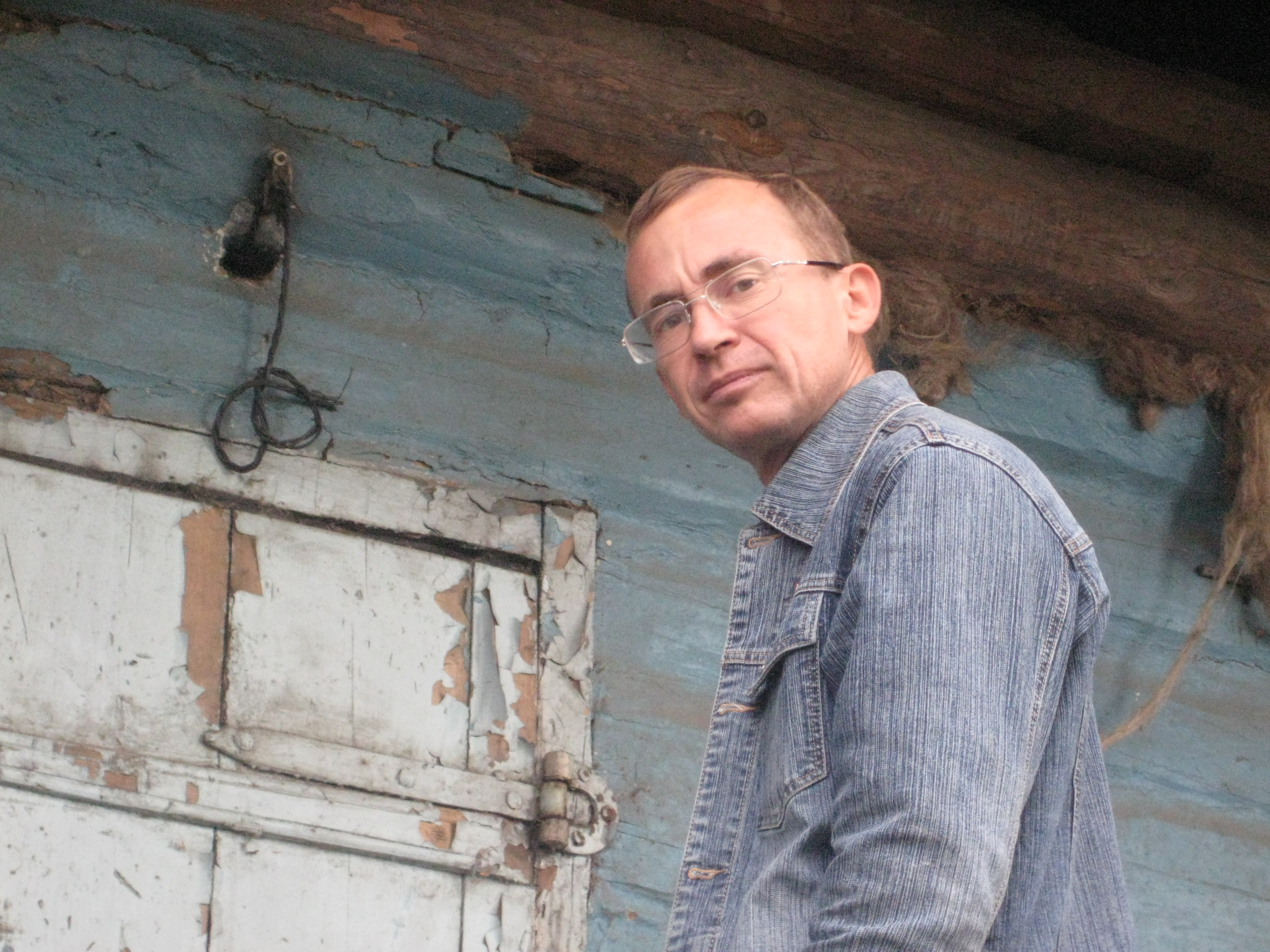
- Born: 1 June 1963 (age 63); Nizhny Novgorod
- Occupation: Writer

Yevgeny Erastov (born 1963 in Gorky, Russia) is a Russian author and poet. His poems were translated into English, Spanish, Bulgarian, German.

== Early life ==
He entered Gorky Medical Institute in 1980, wherein a largely circulated newspaper, the world was given his poetry for the first time. In his second year, he began to attend associations such as "Danko", "Volozka", "Stryna", "Marafon".

Eugene has a medical degree.

== Career ==
In 1989, he was a member of IX All-Union Conference of young writers. As a result of this, his poetry book "Oblako" (Cloud) was recommended to the publishing house "Molodaya Gvardia". But because of the USSR's collapse, the editorial office ceased to exist.

In 1992, Eugene entered Maxim Gorky Literature Institute (Correspondence Department) in Moscow. One of his teachers was writer Yuri Kyznecov. Eugene was allowed to enter "The Union of Russia's Writers" in 1998. At this time, in parallel, he defended two theses on medicine.

His poems were published in magazines as such as: Volga, Moscow, Friendship of Nations, The Star, and New World. He has been published abroad – in journals in the US, Germany and Cuba. He is the author of five poetry and four prose books.

== Recognition ==
He won the Nizniy Novgorod's Award (2008). He won international poetry competitions "The Christmas Star" (2011) and "Tsvetaeva's Fall" (2011).

== List of publications ==
=== Magazines ===
- «Вертикаль» (Н. Новгород) (вып.14, 2005: вып.36, 2012)
- «Волга» (№ 1, 1992)
- «Дружба народов» (№ 3, 1996)
- «Звезда» (№ 2, 2000)
- «Литературен свят» (Болгария) ( вып.45, 2012)
- "Matanzas" (Куба) (№ 1, 2007)
- «Москва» (№ 12, 1994; № 12, 1995; № 7, 1997; № 11, 2003;№ 5, 2004; № 4, 2006; № 5, 2006; № 3, 2007; № 7, 2007; № 3, 2009; № 4, 2010; №5, 2011; №12, 2011; №7, 2012)
- «Московский вестник» (№ 5–6, 1996)
- «Наш современник» (№ 4, 2003; № 5, 2004; № 1, 2006; № 6, 2006; № 7, 2010; №9, 2011; №8, 2012)
- «Нижний Новгород» (№ 10, 1997; № 7, 1998; № 12, 1998; № 6, 1999; № 7, 1999; № 3, 2000)
- «Новый мир» (№ 4, 2004)
