= Damaskin Rudnev =

Russian Orthodox bishop (1737–1795)

Bishop Damaskin (secular name Dmitry Efimovich Semenov-Rudnev Russian: Дмитрий Ефимович Семёнов-Руднев; January 1737 – 18 (29) December 1795) — was a bishop of the Russian Orthodox Church, appointed the Orthodox Church Bishop of Nizhny Novgorod province, the diocese of Nizhny Novgorod and Arzamas. A prominent specialist in the study of early texts, bibliographer and scholar.

Born to a family of a Russian orthodox priest in January 1737 in Tula province, the Russian Empire. In 1750 Damaskin joined the Kolomna seminary and then in 1752 the Moscow clerical academy. Upon graduation in 1761 he was appointed a tutor into the Kolomna seminary. In 1765 he submitted a petition to continue education in England.

In 1766, he was among four students of the Moscow clerical academy Damaskin and was sent to study at the University of Göttingen, Lower Saxony, Germany till 1772 when he returned to Russia.

In December 1774, he was appointed to the position of tutor in the Slavic Greek Latin Academy in Moscow. Since 1775 Damaskin is the prefect and professor of philosophy at the academy. On 8 September 1775 he took monastic vows.

In April 1778, he was promoted to be the archimandrite of the Epiphany Monastery in Moscow and on 24 May 1778 was appointed rector of the Slavic Greek Latin Academy. Is renowned for introducing significant improvements in the way of tutoring, deliberation of the study process from scholasticism, widening of the library and introduction of solemn assembly and public debate at the academy.

Since 19 April 1779, he is a member of the Moscow Synodal Office.

Since 1780 Damaskin is a superintendent of ecclesiastical printing. He also participated in the Free Russian Assembly, established at the Moscow State University.

Он 5 May 1782, archimandrite Damaskin was appointed bishop of Sevsk, a vicar of the diocese of Moscow that soon was followed by ordination of him on 5 July.

Being the bishop of Sevsk, Damaskin was able to improve deanery accounting, elevate sermon and introduce some improvements in the choir.

On 22 September 1783, he moved to Nizhny Novgorod.

Education was the top priority for bishop Damaskin, he cultivated affinity to science among priesthood and used it as the main criteria while appointing new priests within the diocese. He is also known for putting in order local theological seminaries, expanding of teaching of theology, introducing of study of some local languages and extending the libraries.

He was so devoted to science so requested for a number of times from his superiors and even from metropolite Gabriel (Petrov) of St Petersburg to be released of his duty to be able to focus entirely on studying and science.

On 2 January 1794, he was retired and spent the rest of his life at the Intercession (Pokrovsky) Monastery of Moscow where he died on 18 December 1795.

For sparse but valuable academic works of his Damaskin was affiliated to the University of Göttingen as well as become a member of the Russian Academy of Sciences.

His works are mostly related to linguistics, theology, antique literature and translation to German and Latin. He also composed a dictionary of various languages of peoples populating Nizhny Novgorod province like Tatars, Chuvash, Mordvinians and Cheremis.
