= Konstantin Zhitomirsky =

Yiddish scholar and pedagogue

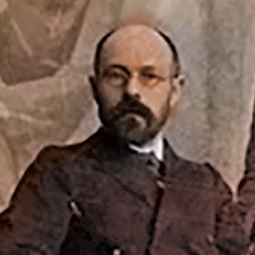
- Born: January 13, 1863; Mariupol, Ukraine
- Died: December 19, 1918; Taganrog, Don Republic

Academic background
- Education: Odessa University

Konstantin Zhitomirsky (born Israel Zhitomirsky) was a Jewish pedagogue and Yiddish scholar born in Ukraine, then part of the Russian Empire.

== Publications ==
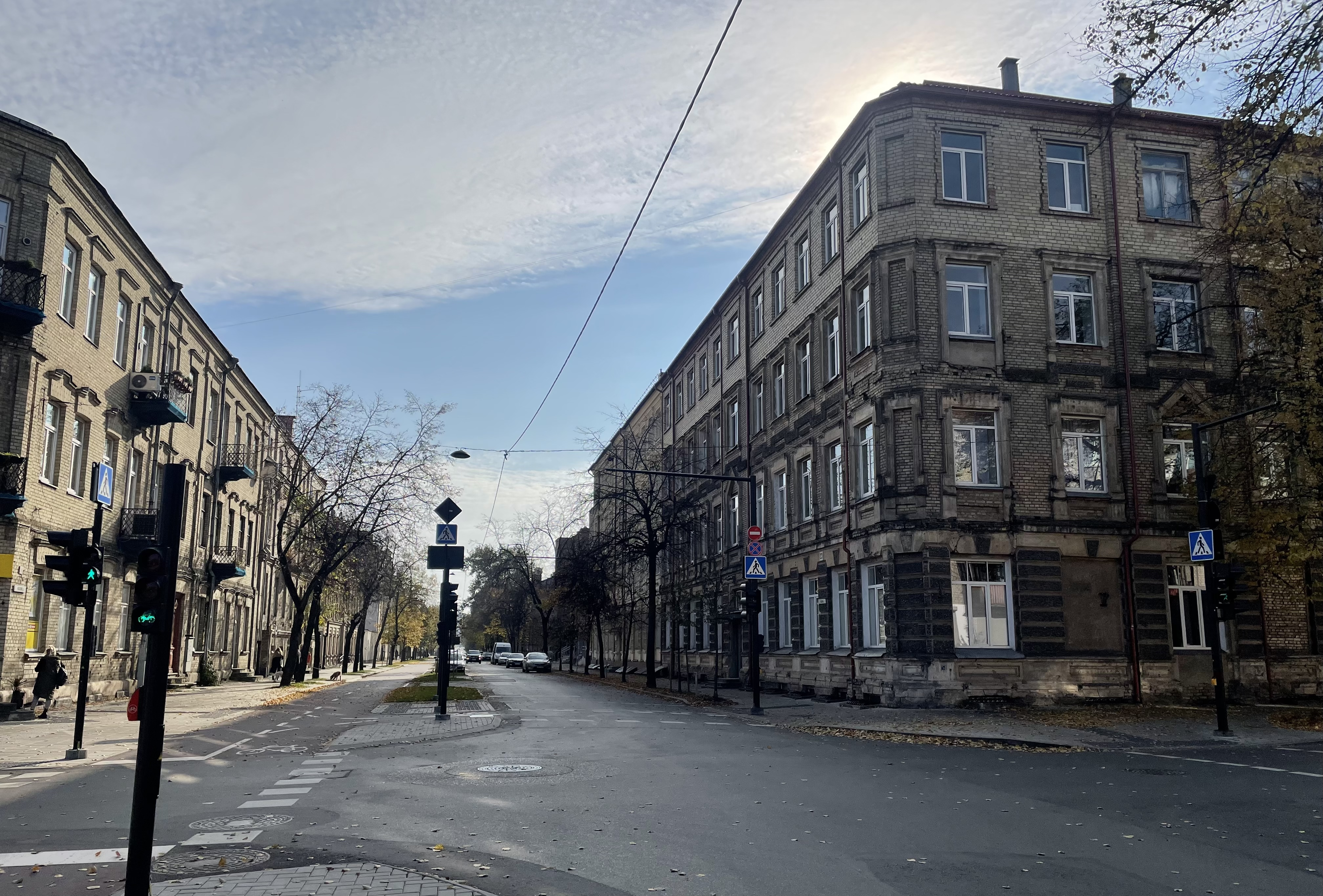
P. I. Kagan's Jewish Gymnasium in Vilnius where Zhitomirsky worked as a teacher in the 1910s

Zhitomirsky was a regular writer for the Saint Petersburg-based journal Courier of the Society for the promotion of enlightenment among the Jews of Russia. Between the years 1910 and 1912, he published a series of articles on the "Judeo-German dialect, its essence and significance" and “What Jews live with, issues in Jewish cultural history".

He co-authored the Yiddish textbook Di naye shul ("The New School") with Dmitri Hochberg. It was published in Vilnius, Lithuania in 1913. He also published a supplement to the book called Di vizuel-fonetishe metode tsu lernen leyenen af yidish ("The visual-phonetic method of learning to read in Yiddish") and intended for use by teachers working with illiterate Yiddish-speaking children. Another supplement to the book entitled Bamerkung un metodishe onvayzungen tsu der "nayer shul" ("Observation and methodical instructions for the "New school") was published in 1918 in Kyiv after he was evacuated to Ukraine during the First World War.

== Family ==
Konstantin Zhitomirsky was a member of the Zhitomirsky family, known as a "dynasty of academics from Taganrog". He was married to Zinaida Vikteshmayer. He was father to the Soviet-Tajikistani epidemiologist Viktor Zhitomirsky and grandfather to the Polish poet Eugeniusz Żytomirski.
