= Eugeniusz Żytomirski =

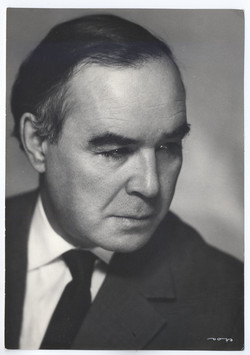
Image of Eugeniusz Żytomirski

Eugeniusz Żytomirski (1911–1975) was a prominent Polish poet, playwright, novelist and essayist.

== Life ==
Born in Taganrog, Russia Empire, Żytomirski died in Toronto, Canada. He became a member of the literary group Kadra.

Żytomirski was a grandson of the Jewish pedagogue and Yiddish scholar Konstantin Zhitomirsky.
