= Viktor Zhitomirsky =

Soviet-Tajikistani epidemiologist

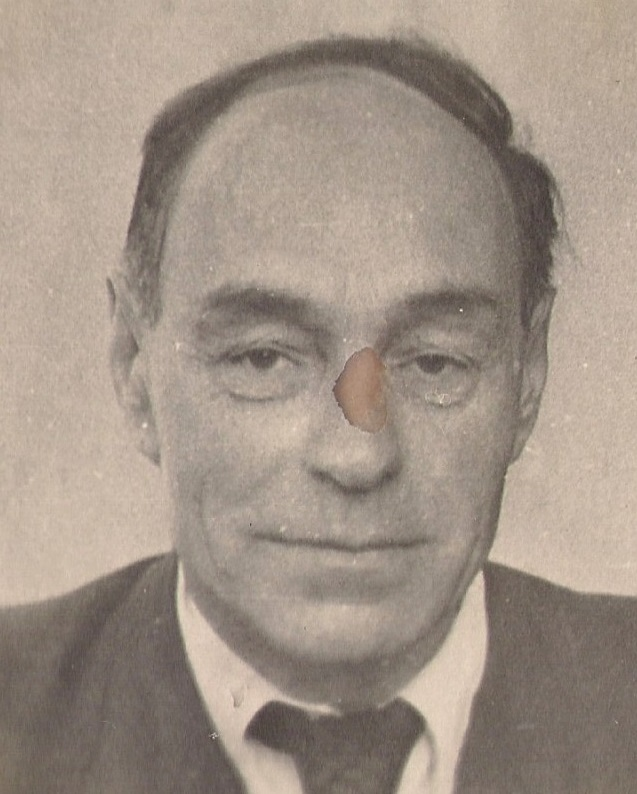
- Born: 30 January 1894; Taganrog, Russian Empire
- Died: 22 November 1954 (aged 60); Moscow, USSR
- Occupation: epidemiologist
- Years active: 1919–1954
- Medical career
- Institutions: Stalinabad Medical Institute
- Research: infectious diseases

Viktor Zhitomirsky (1894–1954) was a Soviet physician, infectious disease scientist and epidemiologist who pioneered the study of microbiology in Tajikistan.

== Biography ==
Viktor Zhitomirsky was born in a Jewish family in Taganrog close to the modern-day Russia–Ukraine border. His father, Konstantin Israel Zhitomirsky, was a Yiddish scholar and pedagogue. His mother, Zinaida Vikteshmayer, was a daughter of a local merchant who owned a coal warehouse.

He graduated from the Kharkiv University in 1919 and took part in the Russian Civil War as a military doctor. Later, he lived in Rostov-on-Don and Moscow where he worked at a research institute which developed vaccines. In 1938, he organized a field trip to Tajikistan where he researched the potential threat of a cholera epidemic which was spreading in neighboring Afghanistan. In 1939, he was offered a job as lecturer at a medical institute in Khabarovsk in the Russian Far East and became a professor.

In the beginning of World War Two, he moved to Dushanbe, then called Stalinabad, which was the capital of the Tajik SSR. In June 1941, he became the first head of the newly established Microbiology Department at the Stalinabad Medical Institute which was later renamed to Avicenna Tajik State Medical University.

According to the Tajik journalist and historian Gafur Shermatov, Zhitomirsky was one of the doctors whose work had helped stop the rapid spread of epidemics in Dushanbe of the 1940s, when the city became a destination for over a hundred thousands evacuees from the European part of the USSR.

Along with his work at the Stalinabad Medical Institute as a lecturer, he was a leading researcher at the local Institute for Tropical Diseases. In this capacity, he co-authored a book on viral hemorrhagic fevers with Samuil Shapiro.

He was fired from both institutions in 1953 under the Soviet anti-cosmopolitan campaign which has been widely described as a thinly disguised antisemitic purge. The formal reason for his dismissal was that one of his research papers on malaria in Central Asia was allegedly offensive to the Tajik people, as he mentioned that their traditional houses made of clay provided a good environment for the disease-carrying marsh mosquitoes.

== Writing ==
Viktor Zhitomirsky was also an amateur writer. His book The Pamir Diary (1943) is a recollection of his field trip to Vanj District in Tajikistan's Pamir Mountains where he helped fight a typhus epidemic.
