= Benildo Sousa Cavada =

Brazilian biochemist and professor (b. 1953)

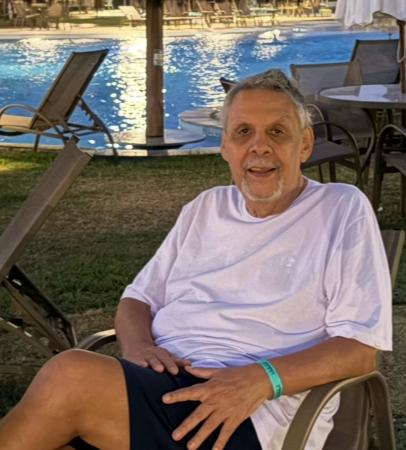
- Born: 12 December 1953 (age 72); Pelotas, Rio Grande do Sul, Brazil
- Education: Federal University of Pelotas, Federal University of Ceará, Toulouse III - Paul Sabatier University
- Known for: Structural studies of plant lectins; legume lectins
- Awards: Commander of the National Order of Scientific Merit (2006); Member of the Brazilian Academy of Sciences (2010)
- Scientific career
- Fields: Biochemistry; Protein Chemistry and Structural Biology
- Workplaces: Federal University of Ceará

Benildo Sousa Cavada (born 12 December 1953) is a Brazilian biochemist and professor, who is recognized for his research on plant lectins and structural biology. Cavada is a professor at the Department of Biochemistry and Molecular Biology at the Federal University of Ceará, where he leads the Laboratory of Biologically Active Molecules (BioMol-Lab). His research advanced the understanding of plant lectins, particularly their structural diversity and biological functions. It established structural and functional data for an entire family of lectins, namely legume lectins. Cavada is a member of the Brazilian Academy of Sciences and a recipient of Brazil's National Order of Scientific Merit.

== Early life and education ==
Benildo Sousa Cavada was born on 12 December 1953 in Pelotas, Rio Grande do Sul, Brazil. He completed his primary education at Grupo Escolar Cassiano do Nascimento and his secondary education at Colégio Agrícola Visconde da Graça, both in Pelotas.

In 1976, Cavada earned a degree in Agronomic Engineering from the Federal University of Pelotas. In 1980, he completed a master's degree in Biochemistry at the Federal University of Ceará. In 1985, he obtained a Doctorat d'État in Sciences Pharmaceutiques (Biochimie Végétale) from the Toulouse III - Paul Sabatier University, France. He later completed three post-doctoral stays in France funded by CAPES, at the Université des Sciences et Technologies de Lille (2004), and at the Centre de Recherches sur les Macromolécules Végétales (CERMAV) in Grenoble (2007 and 2009).

== Academic career ==
Cavada began his academic career at the Federal University of Ceará, where he has served as a faculty member in the Department of Biochemistry and Molecular Biology since the 1980s and has been promoted to full professor in 2011. Cavada has been a productivity fellow of the National Council for Scientific and Technological Development (CNPq) since 1987, currently at the highest level (1A). His primary institutional contribution has been the creation of the BioMol-Lab (Laboratory of Biologically Active Molecules) in 1991, which he has led continuously since its founding. The laboratory has become a reference center for lectin studies of Brazilian biodiversity, focusing on bioprospection, protein chemistry, structural biology and X-ray crystallography of lectins from Brazilian flora.

From 2009 to 2016, He coordinated the National Institute of Science and Technology for NanoBioStructures and NanoBioMolecular Simulation (INCT NANO(BIO)SIMES), with a focus on interdisciplinary research in nanobiotechnology. Cavada was the founder and first coordinator of the Graduate Program in Biotechnology of Natural Resources at UFC (2013–2015).

== Research contributions ==
=== Plant lectins and structural biology ===
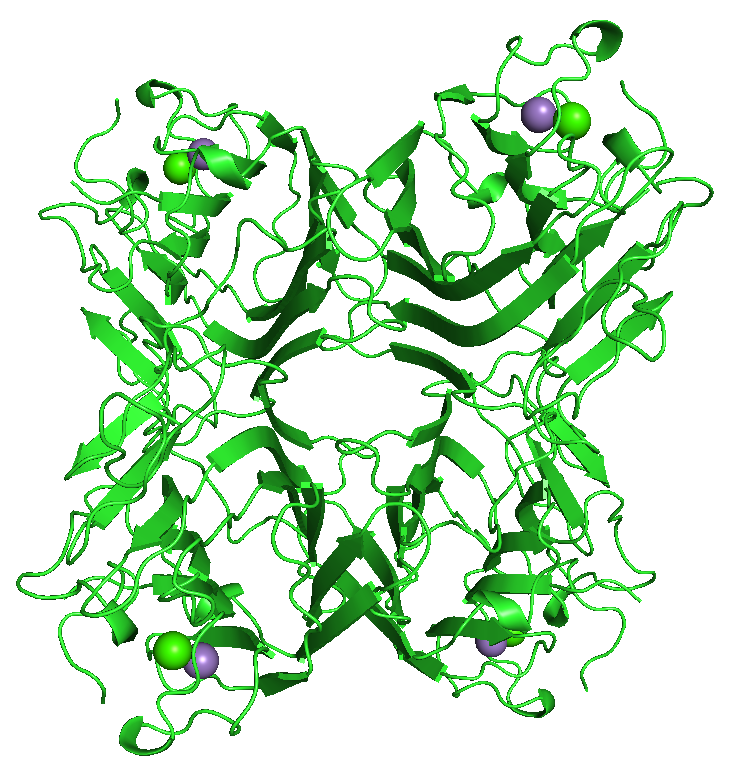
Ribbon diagram of the tetrameric structure of Canavalia brasilensis lectin (PDB ID: 1AZD; structure published in 1997), showing the canonical legume lectin quaternary assembly and the bound Ca²⁺ and Mn²⁺ ions.

Cavada’s research is internationally recognized for its focus on plant lectins and their structural and functional diversity. His work has elucidated the purification methods and molecular architecture of numerous legume lectins, particularly those seeds of the Brazilian flora, and explored their biological activities and potential applications in biotechnology and medicine.

A landmark achievement was the determination of the crystal structure of Canavalia brasiliensis lectin (ConBr), which revealed distinct quaternary conformations compared to the closely related Concanavalin A (ConA). This structural difference was shown to correlate with unique biological properties, such as differential induction of inflammatory responses and immune cell activation. The study, has been published in FEBS Letters in 1997.

Cavada’s laboratory has pioneered the crystallography of plant lectins in Northeast Brazil, establishing the first protein crystallization facility outside the country’s Southeast and contributing to the decentralization of advanced structural biology research in Brazil.

=== Functional and applied studies ===
Beyond structural studies, Cavada has investigated the biological activities of lectins, including their anti-inflammatory, antimicrobial, and antitumor properties. His research has demonstrated the potential of plant lectins as tools for the diagnosis and treatment of cancer, particularly through their ability to recognize specific glycan patterns on tumor cells. Recent studies from his group have highlighted the use of lectins in drug delivery, and as agents with direct antiproliferative effects on cancer cells.

Cavada has also contributed to the understanding of lectin-mediated modulation of immune responses, the development of biotechnological applications such as biosensors, and the exploration of lectins from underexplored legume groups, such as Mimosoideae and Caesalpinioideae.

== Selected publications ==
- Sanz-Aparicio, J.; Hermoso, J.; Grangeiro, T.B.; Calvete, J.J.; Cavada, B.S. (1997). "The crystal structure of Canavalia brasiliensis lectin suggests a correlation between its quaternary conformation and its distinct biological properties from Concanavalin A". FEBS Letters. 405 (1): 114–118. Bibcode:1997FEBSL.405..114S. doi:10.1016/S0014-5793(97)00137-3. hdl:10261/246795. PMID 9094437.
- Cavada, B.S.; Barbosa, T.; Arruda, S.; Grangeiro, T.B.; Barral-Netto, M. (2001). "Revisiting proteus: do minor changes in lectin structure matter in biological activity? Lessons from and potential biotechnological uses of the Diocleinae subtribe lectins". Current Protein & Peptide Science. 2 (2): 123–135. doi:10.2174/1389203013381152. PMID 12370020.
- Cavada, B.S.; Pinto-Junior, V.R.; Osterne, V.J.S.; Nascimento, K.S. (2018). "ConA-Like Lectins: High Similarity Proteins as Models to Study Structure/Biological Activities Relationships". International Journal of Molecular Sciences. 20 (1): 30. doi:10.3390/ijms20010030. PMC 6337138. PMID 30577614.
- Cavada, B.S.; Osterne, V.J.S.; Pinto-Junior, V.R.; Nascimento, K.S. (2019). "ConBr, the Lectin from Canavalia brasiliensis Mart. Seeds: Forty Years of Research". Current Protein & Peptide Science. 20 (6): 600–613. doi:10.2174/1389203720666190104123210. PMID 30608039.
- Cavada, B.S.; Nascimento, K.S.; Osterne, V.J.S. (2025). "Revisiting Proteus 2.0: Two Decades of Pioneering Lectin Crystallography at BioMol-Lab in Northeast Brazil". ACS Omega. 10 (24): 25176–25191. doi:10.1021/acsomega.5c03011. PMC 12199033. PMID 40584308.

== Awards and honors ==
- Commander of the National Order of Scientific Merit in 2006: In recognition of his contributions to agricultural sciences and scientific development.
- Member of the Brazilian Academy of Sciences in 2010: To reflect his standing in the national scientific community.
- National Council for Scientific and Technological Development Productivity Fellowship (Level 1A), since 1987: For research excellence.
