= Jacalin-like lectin domain =

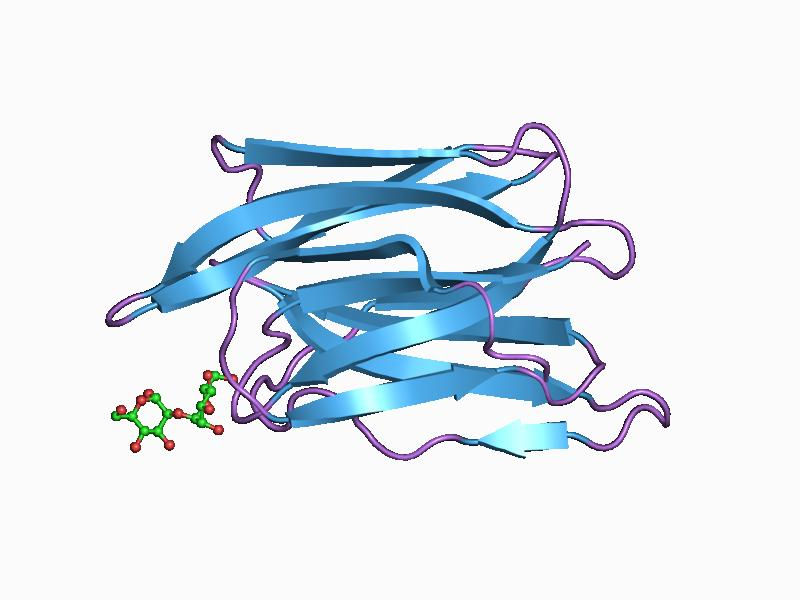
- crystal structure of helianthus tuberosus lectin complexed to man(1-2)man

Identifiers
- Symbol: Jacalin
- Pfam: PF01419
- InterPro: IPR001229
- SCOP2: 1jac / SCOPe / SUPFAM
Available protein structures:
- PDB: IPR001229 PF01419 (ECOD; PDBsum)
- AlphaFold: IPR001229; PF01419

In molecular biology, the jacalin-like lectin domain is a mannose-binding lectin domain with a beta-prism fold consisting of three 4-stranded beta-sheets, with an internal pseudo 3-fold symmetry. Some lectins in this group stimulate distinct T- and B-cell functions, such as Jacalin, which binds to the T-antigen and acts as an agglutinin. This domain is found in 1 to 6 copies in lectins. The domain is also found in the salt-stress induced protein from rice and an animal prostatic spermine-binding protein.

Database of jacalin like lectins and structure function relations. Proteins containing this domain include:

- Jacalin, a tetrameric plant seed lectin and agglutinin from Artocarpus heterophyllus (jackfruit), which is specific for galactose.
- Artocarpin, a tetrameric plant seed lectin from A. heterophyllus.
- Lectin MPA, a tetrameric plant seed lectin and agglutinin from Maclura pomifera (Osage orange).
- Heltuba lectin, a plant seed lectin and agglutinin from Helianthus tuberosus (Jerusalem artichoke).
- Agglutinin from Calystegia sepium (Hedge bindweed).
- Griffithsin, an anti-viral lectin from red algae (Griffithsia species).
