= Okara (food) =

Byproduct of soy milk and tofu production

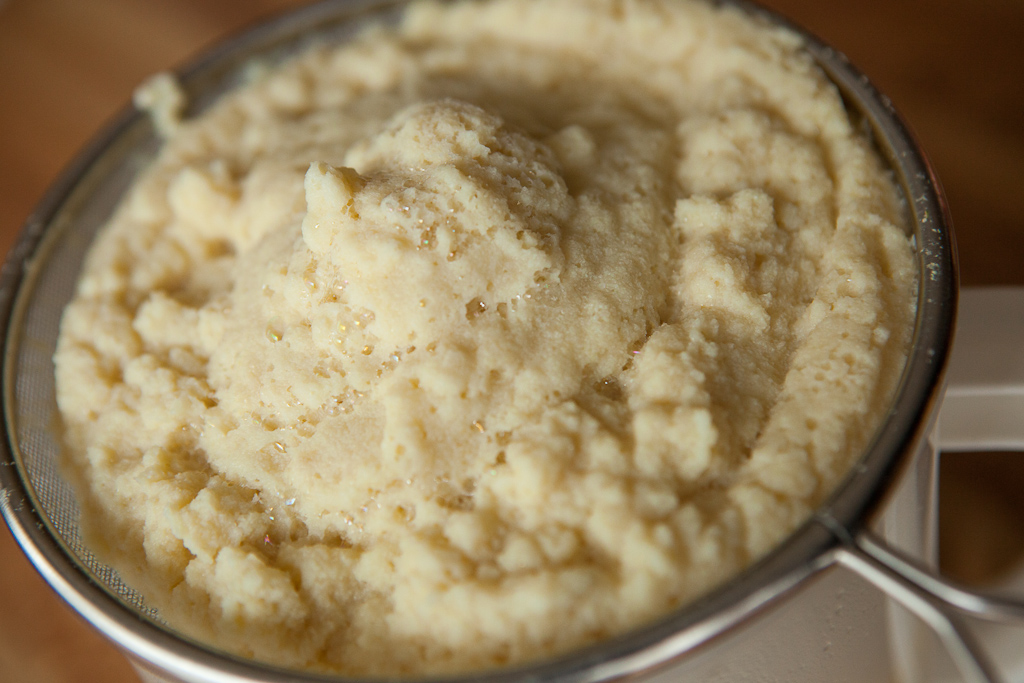
- Filtering okara from a fresh batch of homemade soymilk

Chinese name
- Chinese: 豆渣 / 豆腐渣
Transcriptions
Standard Mandarin
- Hanyu Pinyin: dòu zhā / dòufu zhā
- Gwoyeu Romatzyh: dow ja / dowfu ja
- Wade–Giles: tou^{4} cha^{1} / tou^{4}fu cha^{1}
- IPA: [tôʊ ʈʂá] / [tôʊ.fu ʈʂá]
Yue: Cantonese
- Yale Romanization: dauh jā / dauh-fuh jā
- Jyutping: dau6 zaa1 / dau6 fu6 zaa1
- IPA: [tɐw˨ tsa˥] / [tɐw˨ fu˨ tsa˥]

Japanese name
- Kanji: 雪花菜 / 御殻
- Kana: おから
Transcriptions
- Revised Hepburn: okara

Korean name
- Hangul: 비지 / 콩비지
Transcriptions
- Revised Romanization: biji / kongbiji
- McCune–Reischauer: piji / k'ongbiji

Okara, soy pulp, or tofu dregs is a pulp consisting of insoluble parts of the soybean that remain after pureed soybeans are filtered in the production of soy milk and tofu. It is generally white or yellowish in color. It is part of the traditional cuisines of Japan, Korea, and China. Since the 20th century, it has been used in the vegetarian cuisines of other cultures.

It is called dòuzhā or dòufuzhā in Chinese, okara in Japanese, and biji or kongbiji in Korean.

Okara is the oldest of three basic types of soy fiber. The other two are soy bran (finely ground soybean hulls) and soy cotyledon/isolate fiber (the fiber that remains after making isolated soy protein, also called "soy protein isolate").

== Production ==
Okara is a food by-product from tofu and soy drink production. In 1983 it was estimated that the annual yield for okara in Japan was approximately 70,000 metric tons.

Due to its high moisture and nutrient content, okara is highly prone to biodegradation, and this has limited its commercial use.

== Composition ==
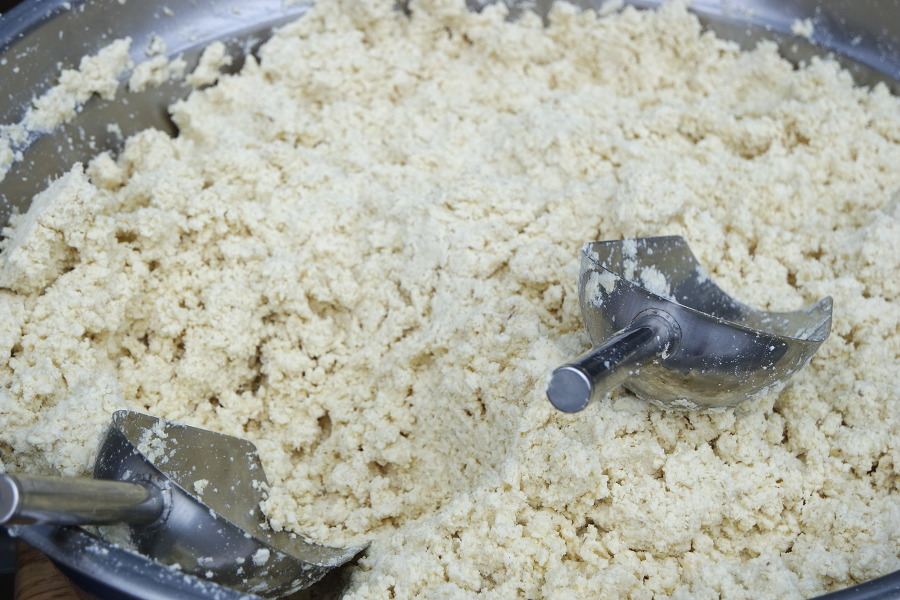
Soy pulp

Okara that is firmly packed consists of 3.5 to 4.0% protein, 76 to 80% moisture and 20 to 24% of solids. When moisture free, the gritty okara contains 8 to 15% fats, 12 to 14.5% crude fiber and 24% protein, and contains 17% of the protein from the source soybeans. It also contains potassium, calcium, and niacin. Most of the soybean isoflavones are left in okara, as well as vitamin B and the fat-soluble nutritional factors, which include soy lecithin, linoleic acid, linolenic acid, phytosterols, tocopherol, and vitamin D.

Okara contains some antinutritional factors: trypsin inhibitors (mostly destroyed by cooking), saponins, and soybean agglutinins, which cannot be easily digested.

Fermentation (by proper species of bacteria) of okara is conducive to digestion and absorption of okara nutrients, and it further improves the nutritional value. It can eliminate the bean's odor, increase the amount of edible fiber, free amino acids and add sugars, fatty acids, vitamin B2, vitamin B12 and flavoprotein.

== Uses ==
Most okara worldwide is used as feed for livestock, especially hogs and dairy cows. Most of the rest is used as a natural fertilizer or compost, which is fairly rich in nitrogen. A small amount is used in cookery.

=== Culinary use ===
In Japan, it is used in a side dish called unohana which consists of okara cooked with soy sauce, mirin, sliced carrots, burdock root and shiitake mushrooms.

Okara can be used to make tempeh, by fermenting with the fungus Rhizopus oligosporus, using a tempeh starter. It can make press cake tempeh using ingredients such as brown rice, bulgur wheat, soybeans and other legume and grain combinations. Okara is also eaten as red oncom by the Sundanese people on Java in Indonesia after fermentation by Neurospora.

Okara is eaten in the Shandong cuisine of eastern China by steaming a wet mixture of okara that has been formed into blocks of zha doufu (also known as xiao doufu or cai doufu).

The product is sometimes used as an ingredient in vegetarian burger patties. Additional uses include processing into a granola product, as an ingredient in soysage, as an egg replacement in vegan quiche, and as an ingredient in pâtés.

In Japan, there have been experiments with incorporating okara into ice cream.

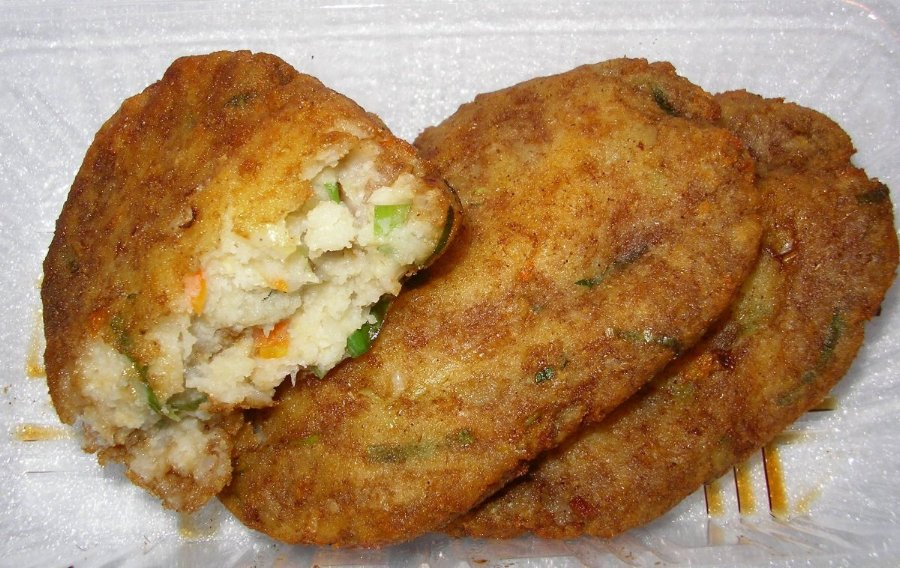
Japanese zerii furai, fried soy pulp and potatoes

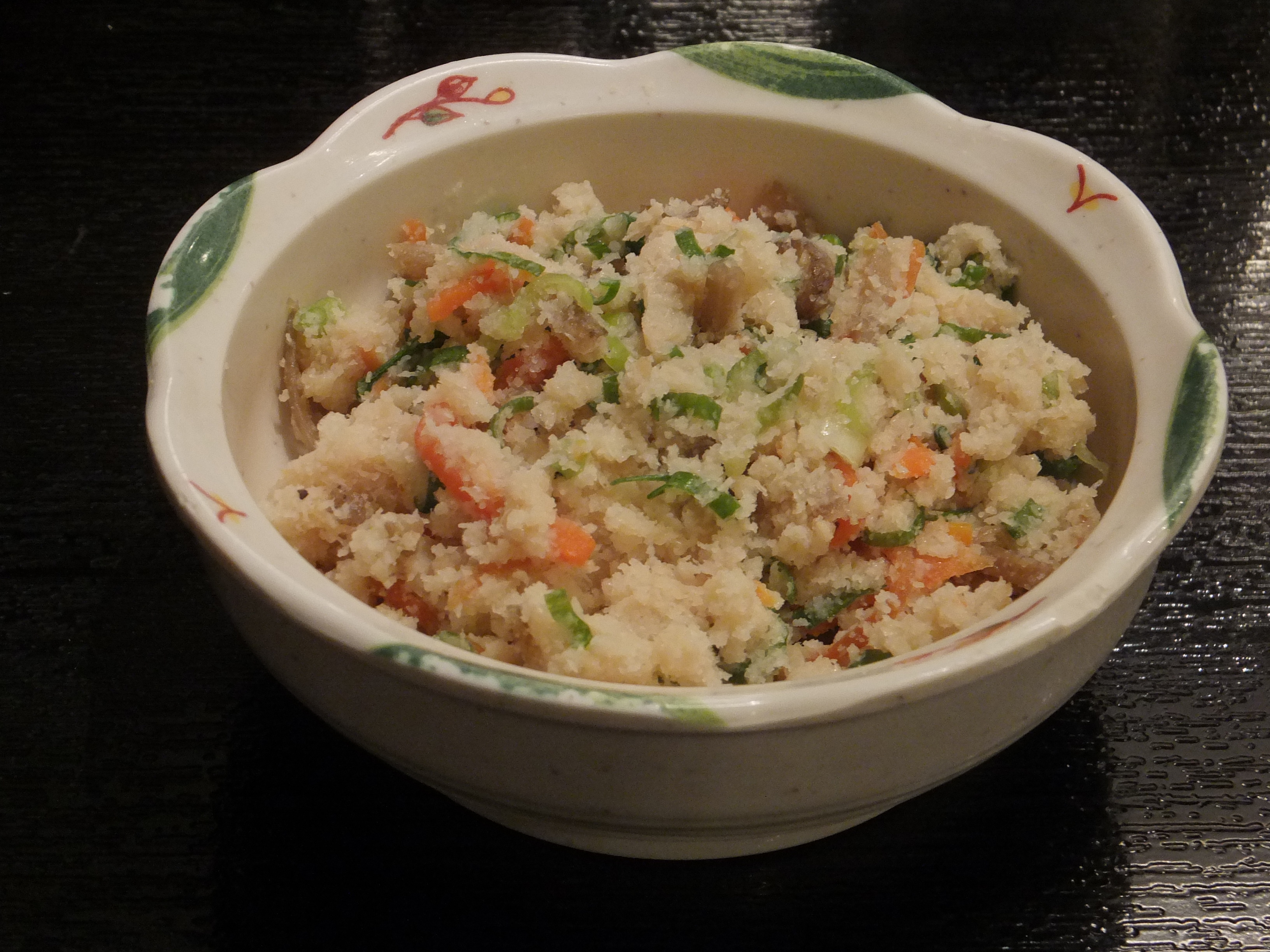
Japanese unohana, stirred fried with vegetables

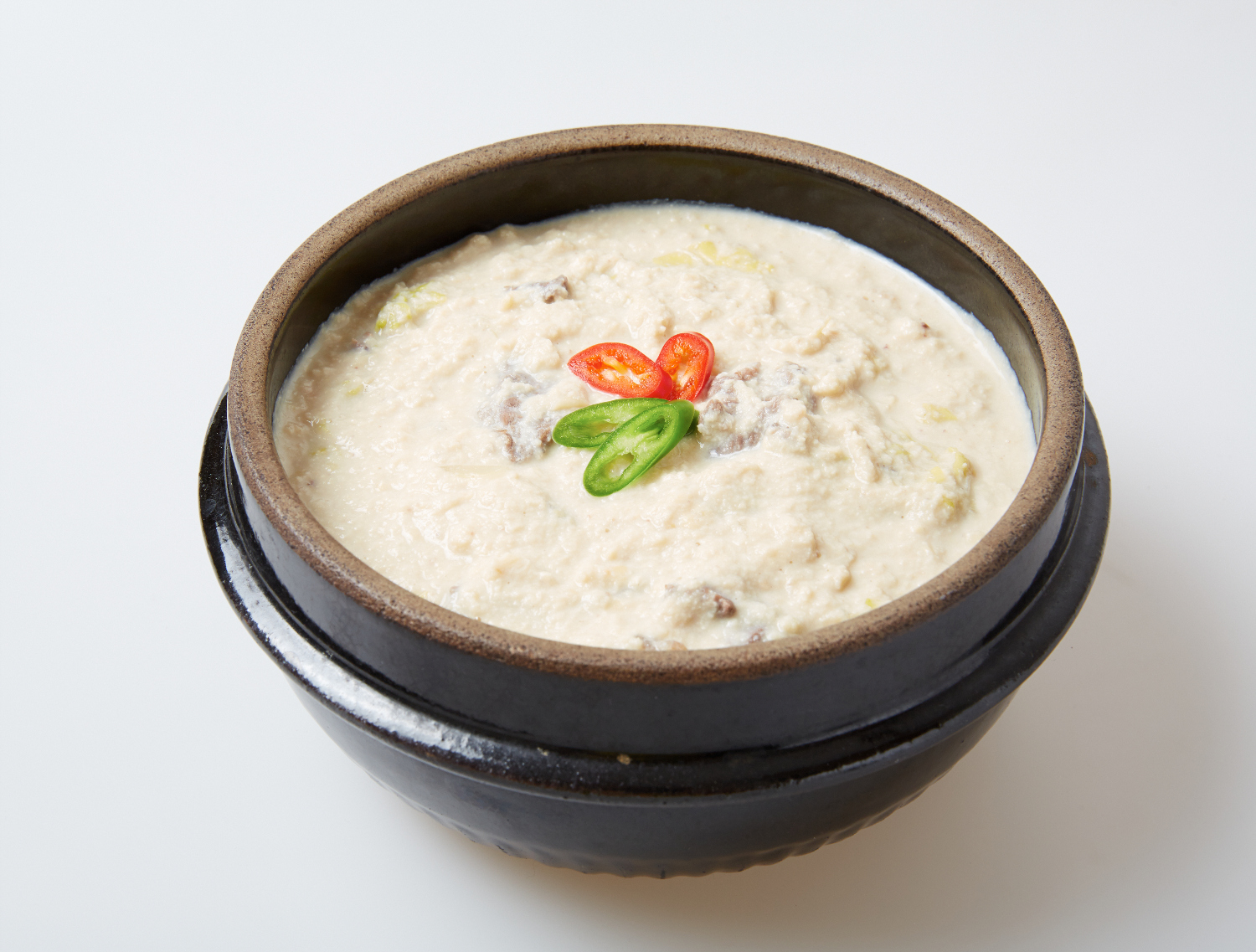
Korean biji jjigae, soy pulp soup

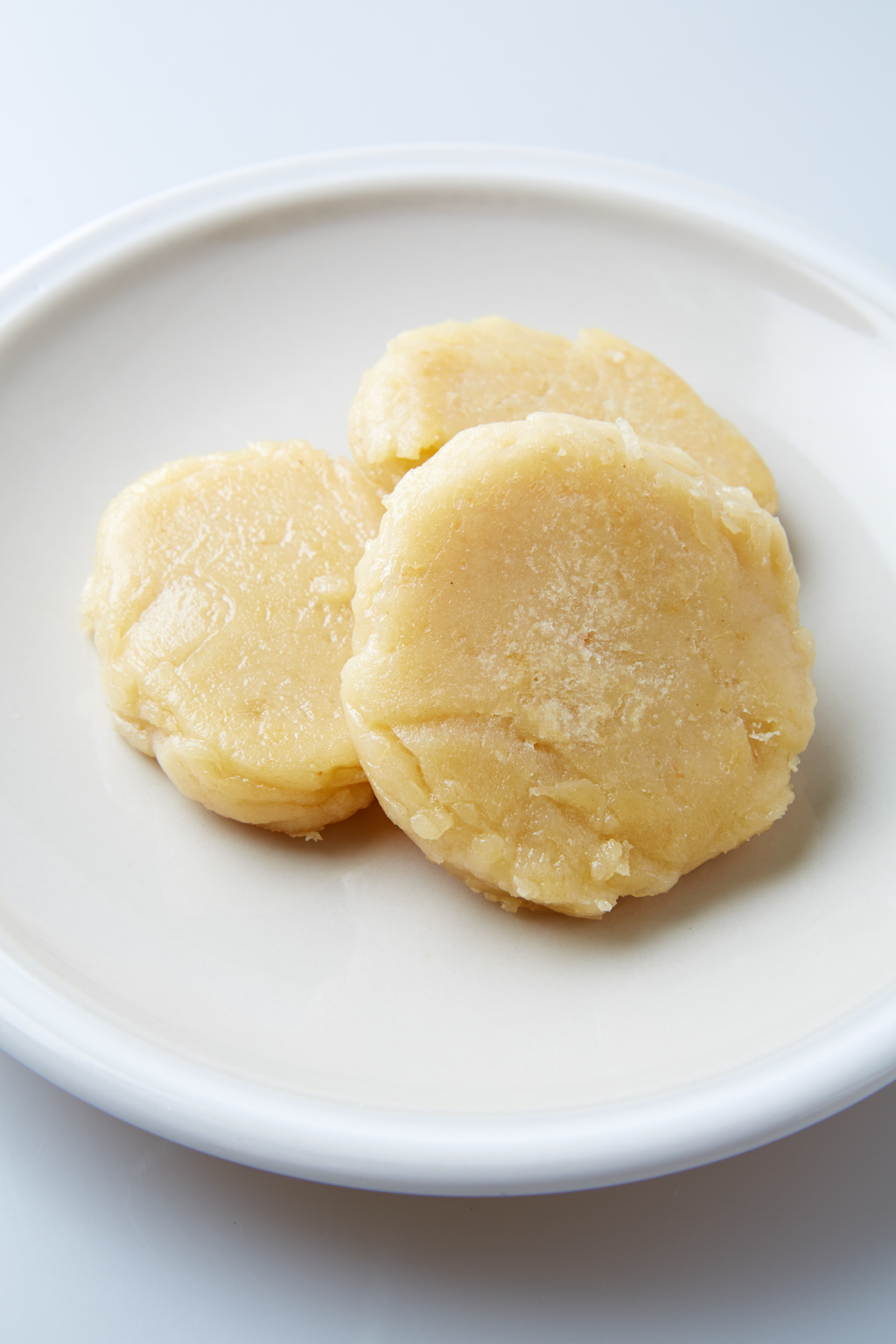
Korean bijitteok, soy pulp rice cakes

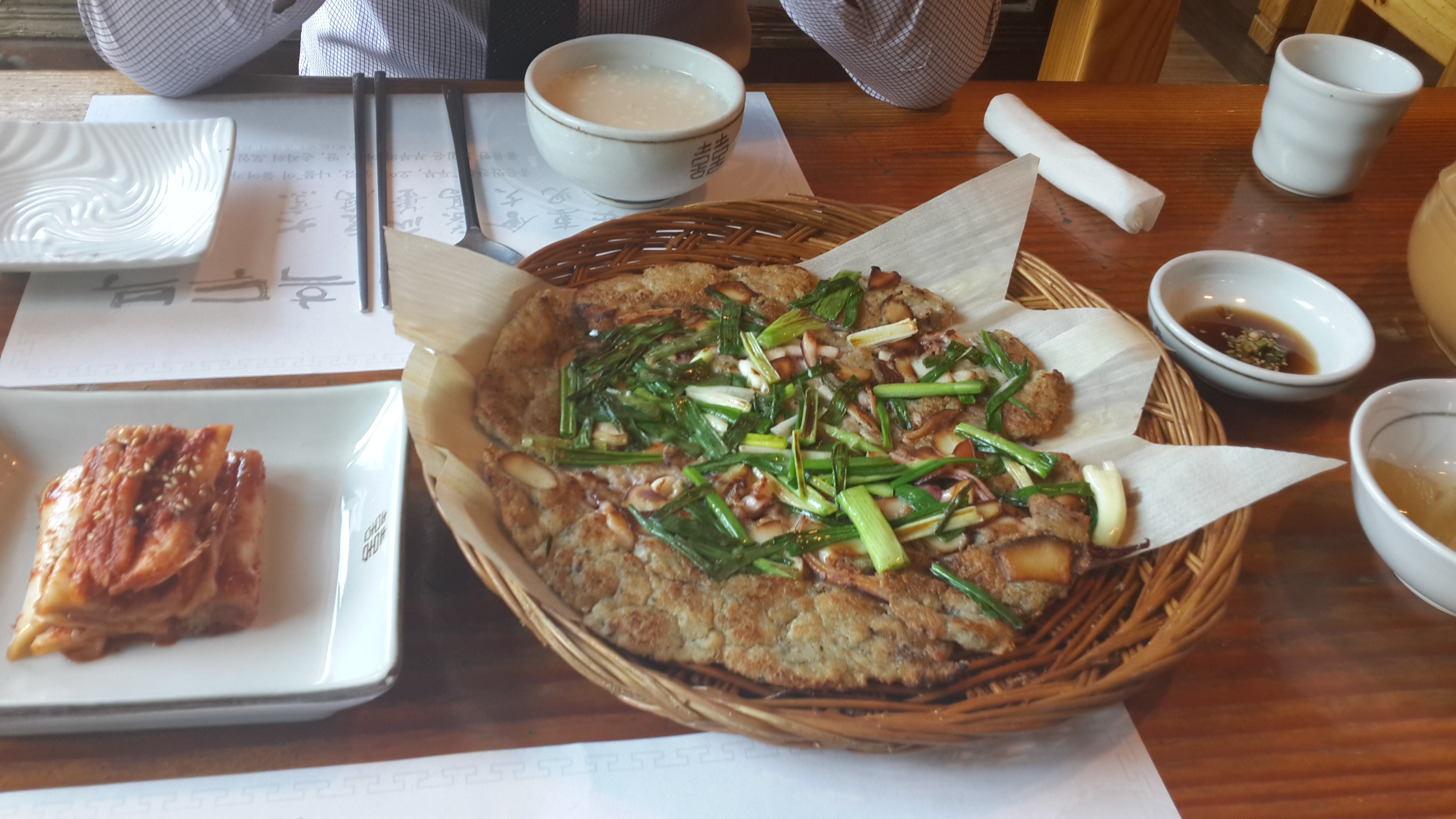
Korean kongbiji jeon, soy pulp pancakes

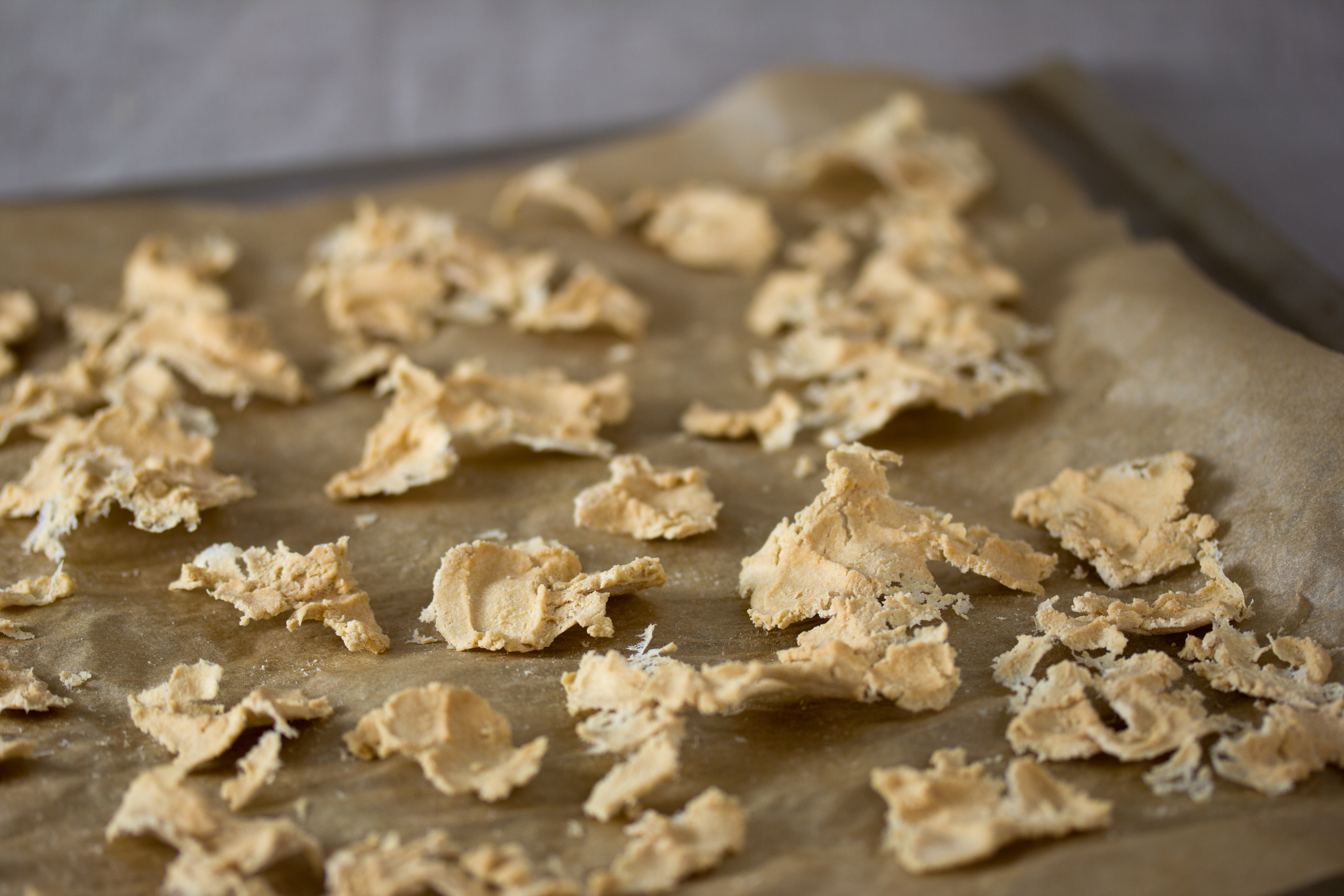
Baked soy pulp curls

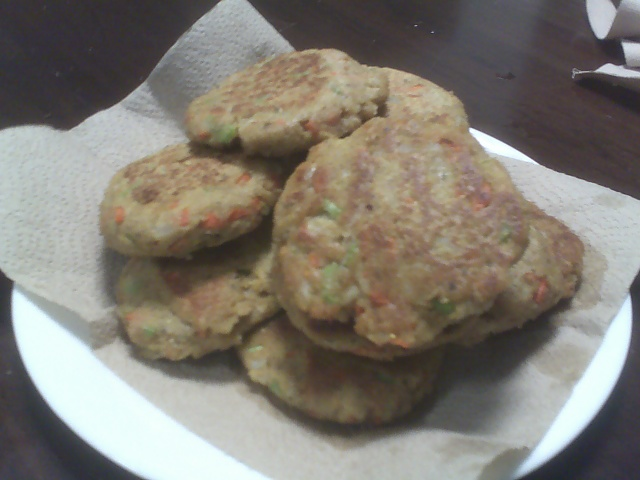
Vegan okara burgers

=== Livestock feed ===
Most okara is used as animal feed, especially for farms in vicinity of soy milk or tofu factories.

=== Pet food ===
The product is used as an ingredient in pet foods.

=== Gardening and agricultural use ===
Okara is sometimes spread on fields as a natural nitrogen fertilizer. It adds tilth to the soil. Likewise, it can be added to compost to add organic nutrients and nitrogen.

== Waste/environment ==
When not considered foodstuff, it may be deemed 'soybean curd residue' (SCR). Some 800,000 tons of soybean curd residue is disposed annually as tofu production byproducts in Japan. As mass waste, it is a potential environmental problem because it is highly susceptible to putrefaction.

The protein in SCR is of better quality than from other soy products; for example, the protein efficiency ratio of SCR is 2.71 compared with 2.11 for soymilk. The ratio of essential amino acids to total amino acids is similar to tofu and soymilk. Nevertheless, it remains a challenge to current processes to commercially extract the proteins and nutrients from SCR waste.

== See also ==
- Tofu-dreg project - a phrase used in the Chinese-speaking world to describe a poorly constructed building.
