= William C. Boyd =

American scientist

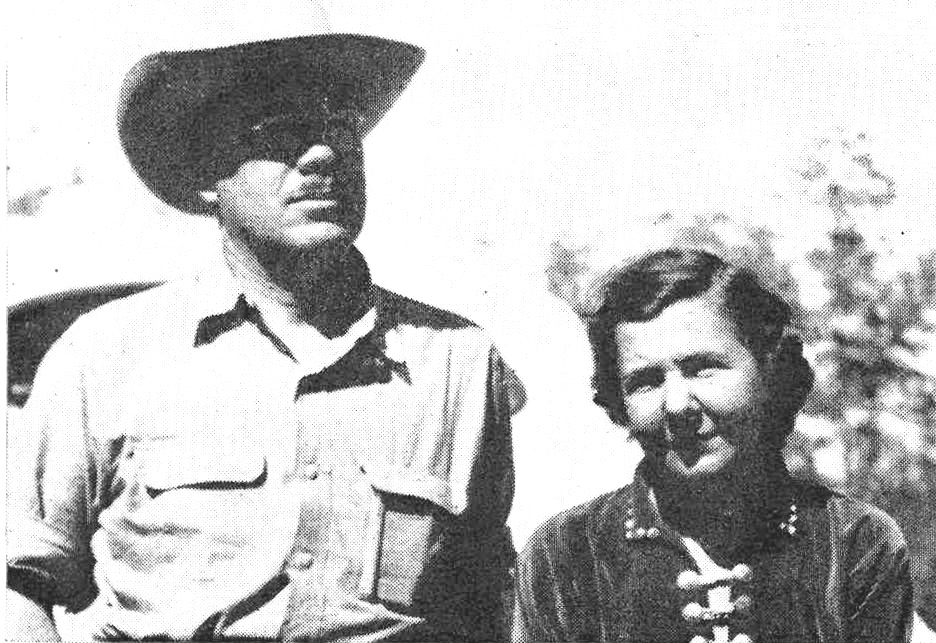
- William C. Boyd and Lyle G. Boyd c. 1953
- Born: William Clouser Boyd; March 4, 1903; Dearborn, Missouri
- Died: February 19, 1983 (aged 79); Falmouth, Massachusetts
- Education: Harvard University (1925); Boston University (Ph.D. 1930)
- Known for: Blood type, Lectin
- Scientific career
- Fields: Immunologist
- Workplaces: Boston University School of Medicine (1926-1968)

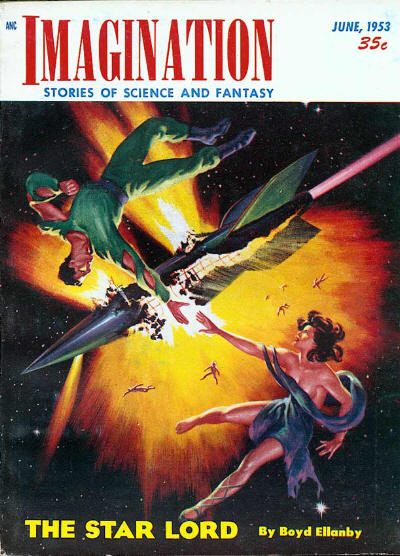
The "Boyd Ellanby" novella "The Star Lord" was the cover story for the June 1953 issue of Imagination

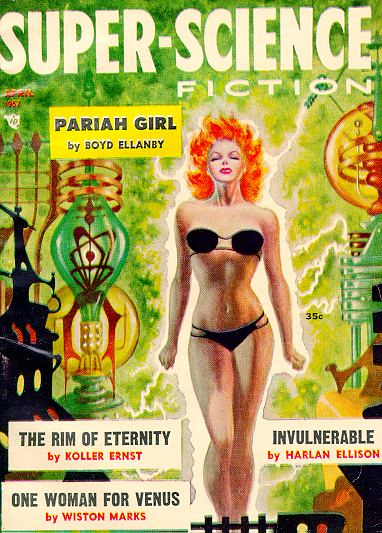
Another "Boyd Ellanby" story, "Pariah Girl" was cover-featured on the April 1957 issue of Super-Science Fiction

William Clouser Boyd (March 4, 1903 – February 19, 1983) was an American immunochemist. In the 1930s, with his wife Lyle, he made a worldwide survey of the distribution of blood types.

== Biography ==
Born in Dearborn, Missouri, Boyd was educated at Harvard and Boston University. His career led to appointment as Professor of Immunochemistry at Boston University.

Boyd's signal contribution was to discover that human blood groups are inherited and not influenced by environment. By genetic analysis of blood groups he hypothesized that human races are populations that differ by alleles. On that basis, he divided the world population into 13 geographically distinct races with different blood group gene profiles. In 1955, Boyd co-published the book Races and People with Isaac Asimov; they were both then professors at Boston University School of Medicine.

Later, Boyd coined the term lectin. He also studied the blood groups of mummies.

Boyd also wrote and published several science fiction short stories in collaboration with his wife Lyle Boyd under the name "Boyd Ellanbee" (obviously standing for "Boyd, L and B", for Lyle and Bill). Once in 1957 he dared Asimov to invent a science-fiction story plot on the spot, and Asimov looked at Boyd's desk calculator and came up with the premise of "The Feeling of Power".

Boyd's papers were donated to the National Library of Medicine by Mrs. Cassandra Boyd in 1983.

== Selected bibliography ==
- Races and People, by Isaac Asimov and William C Boyd, 1955.
- Genetics and the races of man: An introduction to modern physical anthropology, William C Boyd, 1950.
