= Griffithsin =

Protein found in red algae

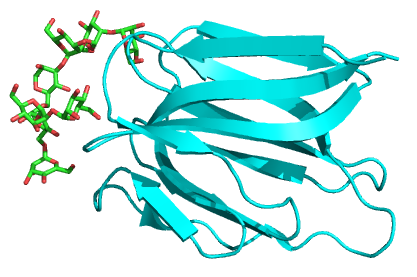
- Griffithsin in complex with a high-mannose branched carbohydrate. PDB 3ll2

Identifiers
- Organism: Griffithsia sp. (Red alga)
- Symbol: GRFT
- Orthologs: OMA: entry
- PDB: 3ll2More structures
- UniProt: P84801
Search for
- Structures: Swiss-model
- Domains: InterPro

Griffithsin is a protein isolated from the red algae Griffithsia. It has a 121-amino acid sequence which exhibits a Jacalin-like lectin fold. Several structures of this protein have been solved by X-ray crystallography and deposited in the PDB. It has been shown in vitro to be a highly potent HIV entry inhibitor. It is currently being investigated as a potential microbicide for use in the prevention of the transmission of HIV.

Griffithsin shows a broad spectrum ability to bind to the glycoproteins of other viruses, such as the coronavirus. Griffithsin's three identical carbohydrate binding sites bind to oligosaccharides present on some envelopes of viral glycoproteins. This was demonstrated by in vitro and in vivo studies. For instance, it was shown that griffithsin binds to the SARS-CoV spike glycoprotein to inhibit entry of the SARS virus and thus inhibit infection. A 2014 study showed griffithsin to also possess useful antiviral activity against Ebolavirus.

As reported in March 2009, Kenneth Palmer and coworkers modified the tobacco mosaic virus to incorporate the griffithsin gene and infected more than 9,300 tobacco plants. They were able to extract enough griffithsin to produce about 100,000 HIV microbicide doses from the leaves.
