= Soybean agglutinin =

Type of protein in soybeans

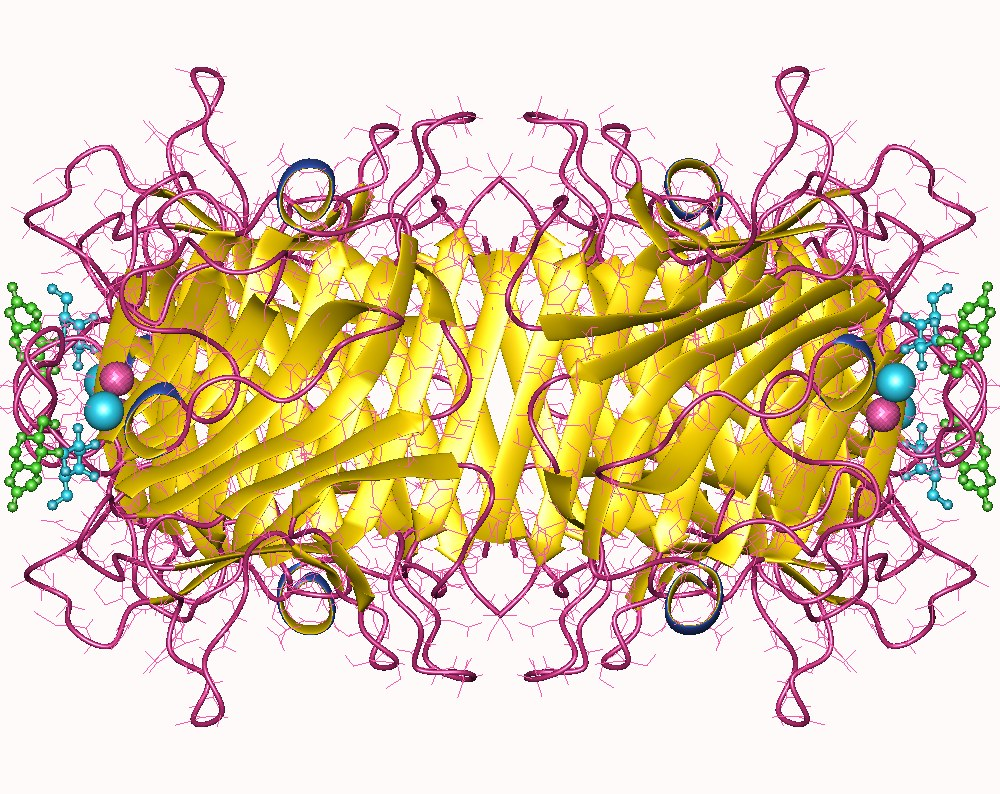
Soybean agglutinin, Glycine max.

Soybean agglutinins (SBA) also known as soy bean lectins (SBL) are a carbohydrate-binding protein (known as lectins) family found in soybeans, making them a subroup of legume lectins.

== Characteristics ==
SBAs have a molecular weight of 120 kDa and an isoelectric point near pH 6.0 SBA preferentially binds to oligosaccharide structures with terminal α-helix or β-sheet linked N-acetylgalactosamine, and to a lesser extent, galactose residues. Binding can be blocked by substitutions on penultimate sugars, such as fucose attached to the penultimate galactose in blood group B. Soybean lectin has a metal binding site, which is conserved among beans.

SBA binds to intestinal epithelial cells, causing inflammation and intestinal permeability, and is a major factor in acute inflammation from raw soybean meal fed to animals. The same study concludes "The data indicate that soybean lectin is able to induce a local inflammatory reaction but has an anti-inflammatory effect when present in circulating blood".

Studies on rats fed SBA had complex changes: With increasing doses of soybean agglutinin, the activities of aspartate aminotransferase linearly increased in plasma and decreased plasma insulin content without decrease in blood glucose levels. Consumption of soybean agglutinin resulted in a depletion of lipid and an overgrowth of small intestine and pancreas in rats. Meanwhile, poor growth of spleen and kidneys and pancreatic hypertrophy was observed in the soybean agglutinin-fed rats.

== Applications ==
An important application for SBA is the separation of pluripotent stem cells from human bone marrow. Cells fractionated by SBA do not produce graft vs host disease and can be used in bone marrow transplantation across histocompatibility barriers.

SBA binding has been investigated as a useful tool for detection of stomach cancer.
