= CLEC11A =

Protein-coding gene in humans

Identifiers
- Aliases: CLEC11A, CLECSF3, LSLCL, P47, SCGF, C-type lectin domain family 11 member A, C-type lectin domain containing 11A
- External IDs: OMIM: 604713; MGI: 1298219; GeneCards: CLEC11A

Gene location (Human)
Chr.	Chromosome 19 (human)
Band	19q13.33	Start	50,723,364 bp
Band	19q13.33	End	50,725,708 bp

Gene location (Mouse)
Chr.	Chromosome 7 (mouse)
Band	7|7 B3	Start	43,952,111 bp
Band	7|7 B3	End	43,956,326 bp
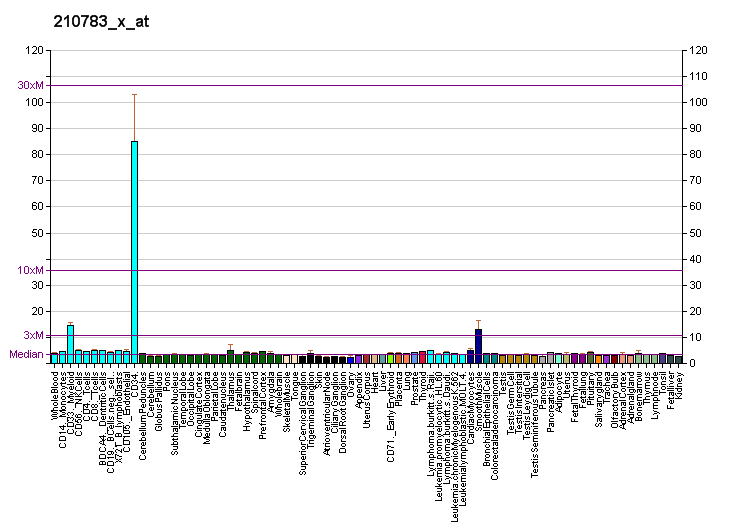

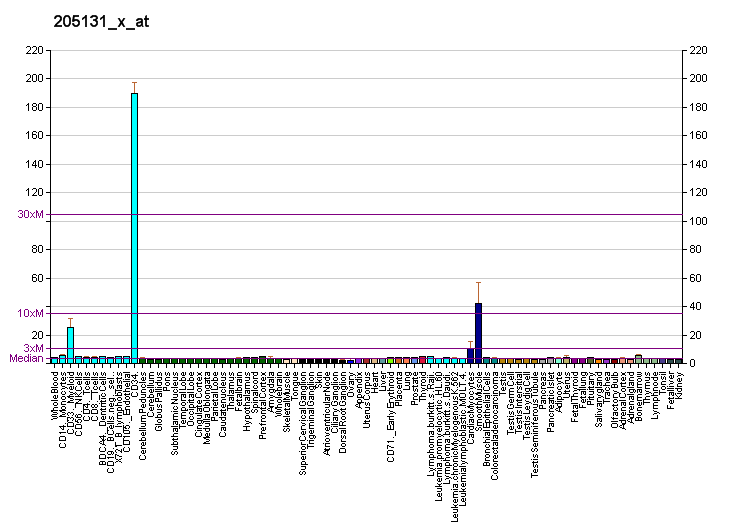

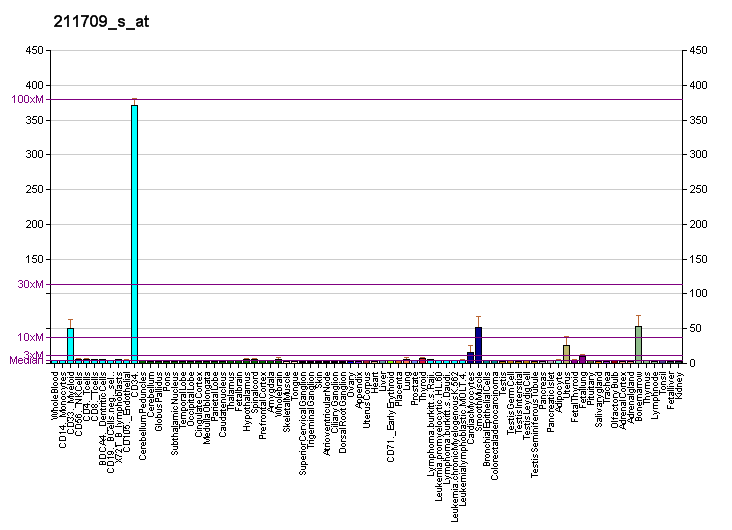
RNA expression pattern
Bgee	Human / Mouse (ortholog); Top expressed in: stromal cell of endometrium; tibia; periodontal fiber; trabecular bone; canal of the cervix; bone marrow; right ovary; left uterine tube; left ovary; right uterine tube / Top expressed in: calvaria; body of femur; fossa; condyle; umbilical cord; molar; ankle; vestibular sensory epithelium; ascending aorta; carotid body; More reference expression data
BioGPS	More reference expression data
Gene ontology
Molecular function	growth factor activity; carbohydrate binding
Cellular component	cytoplasm; extracellular region; extracellular space
Biological process	positive regulation of cell population proliferation; ossification; regulation of signaling receptor activity; signal transduction
Sources:Amigo / QuickGO
Orthologs
Databases	NCBI: entry; OMA: entry
Species	Human	Mouse
Entrez	6320	20256
Ensembl	ENSG00000105472	ENSMUSG00000004473
UniProt	Q9Y240	O88200
RefSeq (mRNA)	NM_002975	NM_009131
RefSeq (protein)	NP_002966	NP_033157
Location (UCSC)	Chr 19: 50.72 – 50.73 Mb	Chr 7: 43.95 – 43.96 Mb
PubMed search
- Wikidata
View/Edit Human	View/Edit Mouse

C-type lectin domain family 11 member A is a protein that in humans is encoded by the CLEC11A gene.

== Function ==
This gene encodes a member of the C-type lectin superfamily. The encoded protein is a secreted sulfated glycoprotein and functions as a growth factor for primitive hematopoietic progenitor cells. An alternative splice variant has been described but its biological nature has not been determined.
