= Jacalin =

Lectin found in jackfruit

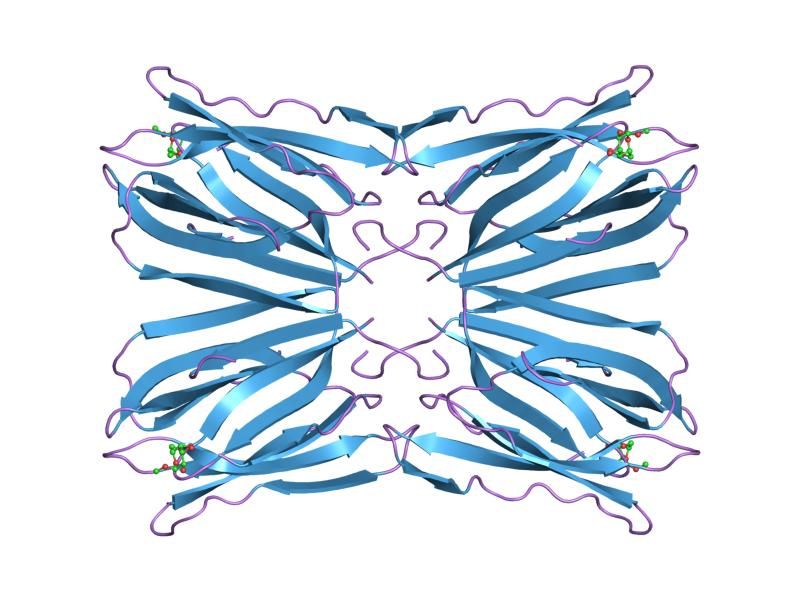

Jacalin is a plant-based lectin, but not a legume lectin, found in jackfruit. It has been studied for capturing O-glycoproteins such as mucins and IgA1, for potential applications in human immunology.

Jacalin belongs to a family of galactose-binding lectins containing the Jacalin-like lectin domain and it has a tetrameric two-chain structure with a weight of 66 kDa

Jacalin is preferably used in applications to isolate IgA from human serum, isolating human plasma glycoproteins and for applications in histochemistry. The lectin is blood group non-specific after neuraminidase treatment and agglutinates human erythrocytes at a concentration of ≥ 7,8 μg/mL.

A post-translational proteolytic modification of Jacalin gives the lectin a novel carbohydrate-binding site involving the N-terminus of the a-chain. The relative affinities of the lectin for galactose derivatives, as well as the structural basis of its T-antigen specificity, are explained by its protein structure

== See also ==
- Common Bean
