= Concanavalin domain =

Protein structural motif

Concanavalin
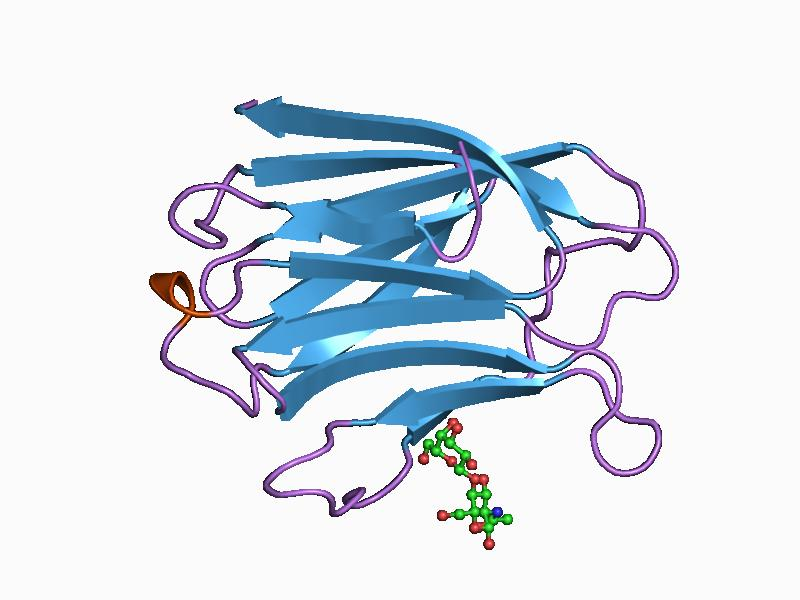
- Cartoon representation of the molecular structure of the crystal structure of the human galectin-3 carbohydrate recognition domain (PDB: 1a3k)

Identifiers
- Symbol: Concanavalin
- Pfam clan: CL0004
- ECOD: 10.1
- InterPro: IPR013320
Available protein structures:
- PDB: IPR013320
- AlphaFold: IPR013320

In molecular biology the superfamily concanavalin is named after Concanavalin A (ConA), a well-studied lectin originally extracted from the jack-bean (Canavalia ensiformis). This superfamily includes a diverse range of carbohydrate binding domains and glycosyl hydrolase enzymes that share a common structure.

== Structure ==
The superfamily is characterised by a sandwich structure arranged in two sheets with a complex topology.

== Examples ==
- Concanavalin A (ConA): A homotetramer that binds specifically to certain sugars, glycoproteins, and glycolipids. It has applications in biology and biochemistry for characterising glycoproteins and purifying glycosylated macromolecules.
- CHS1/LYST Protein: Contains a ConA-like lectin domain, suggesting a role in oligosaccharide binding associated with protein traffic and sorting along the secretory pathway.
- Lectin Receptor-like Kinases: Some plant proteins, such as LecRK-I.9, combine a ConA-like lectin domain with a protein kinase domain, involved in protein-protein interactions and cell wall-plasma membrane signalling.

== Clinical significance ==
- The ConA-like domain in CHS1/LYST is critical for lysosome function. Its disruption leads to Chediak-Higashi syndrome, characterised by immune dysfunction and albinism.
- ConA promotes autophagy in glioblastoma cells.
- ConA enhances endothelial cell proliferation and angiogenesis, potentially aiding tumour vascularisation. This contrasts with its tumour-suppressive effects in hepatoma, highlighting context-dependent roles.
