= Proliferative vitreoretinopathy =

Eye disease

- Specialty: Ophthalmology

Proliferative vitreoretinopathy (PVR) is a disease that develops as a complication of rhegmatogenous retinal detachment. PVR occurs in about 8–10% of patients undergoing primary retinal detachment surgery and prevents the successful surgical repair of rhegmatogenous retinal detachment. PVR can be treated with surgery to reattach the detached retina but the visual outcome of the surgery is very poor. A number of studies have explored various possible adjunctive agents for the prevention and treatment of PVR, such as methotrexate, although none have yet been licensed for clinical use.

PVR was originally referred to as massive vitreous retraction and then as massive periretinal proliferation. The name proliferative vitreo retinopathy was provided in 1989 by the Silicone Oil Study group. The name is derived from proliferation (by the retinal pigment epithelial and glial cells) and vitreo retinopathy to include the tissues which are affected, namely the vitreous humor (or simply vitreous) and the retina.

== Predisposing factors ==
Predisposing factors for Postoperative PVR are preoperative PVR, aphakia, high levels of vitreous proteins, duration of retinal detachment before corrective surgery, the size of the retinal hole or tear, intra-ocular inflammation, vitreous hemorrhage, and trauma to the eye. An equation to calculate the patient's risk for acquiring PVR is:

PVR score = 2.88 × (Grade C PVR)+ 1.85 × (Grade B PVR) + 2.92 × (aphakia) + 1.77 × (anterior uveitis) + 1.23 × (quadrants of detachment) + 0.83 × (vitreous haemorrhage) + 23 × (previous cryotherapy)

1 is added if the risk factor is present and 0 if the risk factor is absent. A patient is at a high risk for developing PVR if their PVR score is >6.33.

== Pathology ==
During rhegmatogenous retinal detachment, fluid from the vitreous humor enters a retinal hole. The mechanisms by which retinal holes or tears form are not fully understood yet. The accumulation of fluid in the subretinal space and the tractional force of the vitreous on the retina result in rhegmatogenous retinal detachment. During this process the retinal cell layers come in contact with vitreous cytokines. These cytokines trigger the ability of the retinal pigmented epithelium (RPE) to proliferate and migrate. The process involved resembles fibrotic wound healing by the RPE cells. The RPE cells undergo epithelial-mesenchymal transition (EMT) and develop the ability to migrate out into the vitreous. During this process the RPE cell layer-neural retinal adhesion and RPE-ECM (extracellular matrix) adhesions are lost. The RPE cells lay down fibrotic membranes while they migrate and these membranes contract and pull at the retina. All these finally lead to secondary retinal detachment after primary retinal detachment surgery. A number of studies have also shown that arachidonic acid metabolic cascade (one of the major inflammatory cascades) is important in the development of PVR. COX-2 expression was found in human idiopathic epiretinal membranes. Phospholipase A2 and cyclooxygenase blocking reduced structural abnormalities of the rat retina in concanavalin model of PVR and reduced the frequency of membrane formation by 43% in the dispase model of PVR and by 31% in the concanavalin one. Lornoxicam not only normalized the expression of cyclooxygenases in both models of PVR, but also neutralized the changes of the retina and the choroid thickness caused by the injection of pro-inflammatory agents.

PVR is graded as Grade A, B, or C by the Silicone Oil Study and as Grade A, B, C, or D by the Retina Society Terminology Committee.

- Grade A is characterized by the appearance of vitreous haze and RPE cells in the vitreous.
- Grade B is characterized by wrinkling of the edges of the retinal tear or the inner retinal surface.
- Grade C is characterized by the presence of retinal membranes.

== Retinal membranes ==
The RPE cells migrate out into the vitreous, proliferate excessively and lay down ECM on both side sides of the detached retina. The ECM laid on the vitreous side of the retina are referred to as epiretinal or preretinal membranes (ERM) and those laid down between the RPE layer and the photoreceptors are referred to as subretinal or retroretinal membranes (SRM) . The two membranes differ in composition in that the ERM is composed of RPE cells, glial cells, macrophages and fibrocytes, while the SRM is rich in RPE cells. The subretinal membranes are of two types. One forms as diffuse sheets, which are not contractile and either lack or contain very little ECM. The presence of this type of membrane does not usually affect retinal reattachment surgery. The retina can be reattached even with the membrane in place. The other type forms as very thick contractile membranes which pull at the retina. These are opaque and block the light falling on the retina so the retinal reattachment surgery needs to be performed after manually peeling the membrane off.

== Cytokines involved in PVR ==
A number of cytokines such as tumor necrosis factor alpha (TNFα), transforming growth factor beta 2 (TGFβ_{2}), platelet derived growth factor (PDGF) and interleukins have been shown to play a role in PVR progression.

TGFβ_{2} levels have been shown to be elevated up to three times normal during the progression of PVR. TGFβ_{2} is the most predominant isoform in the eye and is secreted as a latent inactive peptide into the vitreous by epithelial cells of the ciliary body and the lens epithelium and is also produced by the RPE cells and the Muller cells of the retina. TGFβ_{2} is known to induce EMT in RPE cells and fibrosis in the eye. Expression of PDGF in particular PDGF-AA is triggered during ocular injury and contributes to PVR pathology. RPE cells express the receptor for hepatocyte growth factor (HGF). HGF stimulates RPE cell migration and its presence is also strongly detected in retinal membranes. Interleukin 6 levels are elevated in the vitreous humor during PVR.
