= Concanavalin A =

Lectin (carbohydrate-binding protein)

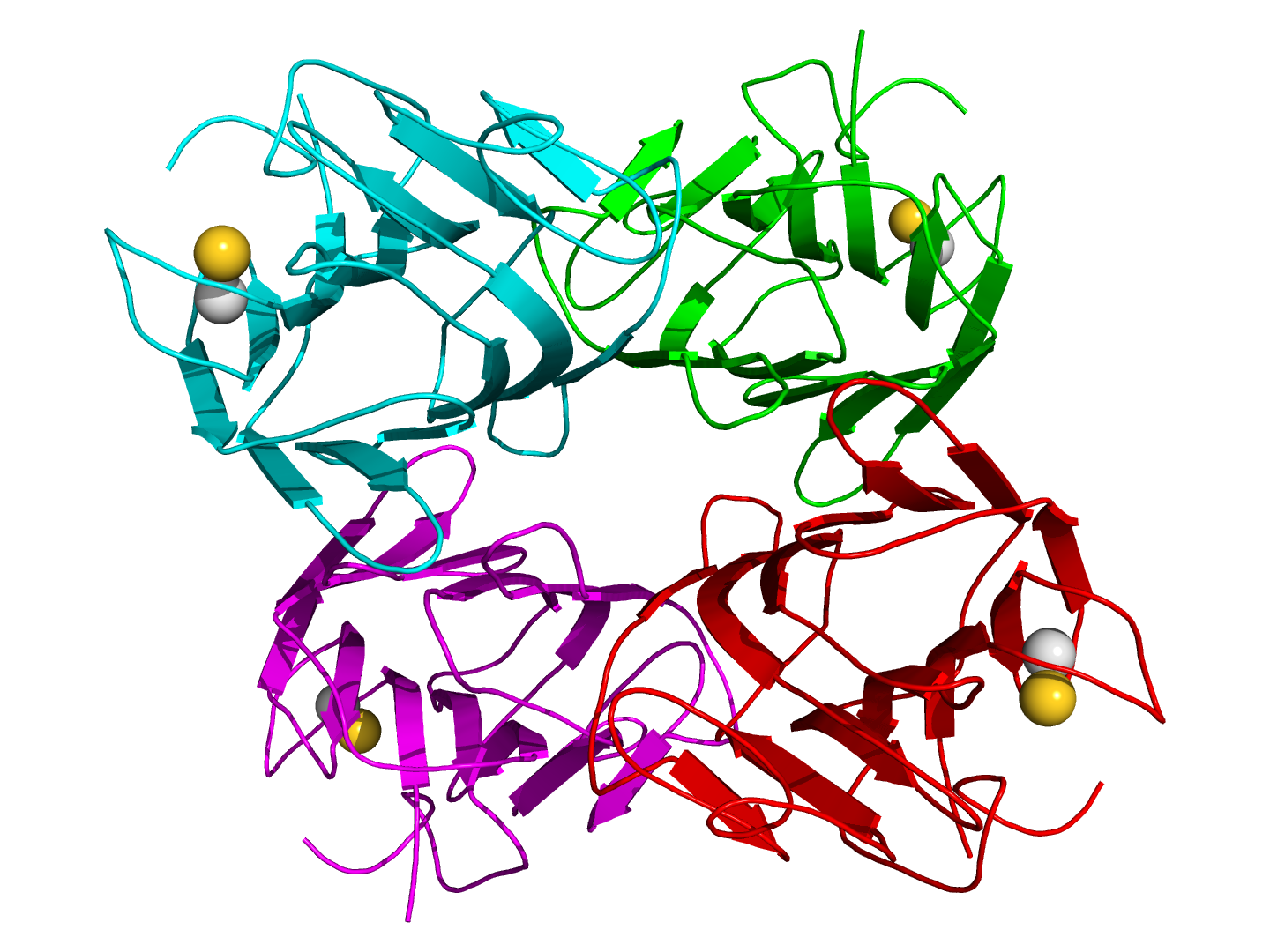
- Crystallographic structure of a tetramer of jack bean concanavalin A (the monomers are colored cyan, green, red, and magenta respectively). Calcium (gold) and manganese cations (grey) are depicted as spheres.

Identifiers
- Organism: Canavalia ensiformis (jackbean)
- Symbol: ConA
- Orthologs: OMA: entry
- PDB: 3CNA
- UniProt: P81461
Search for
- Structures: Swiss-model
- Domains: InterPro

Concanavalin A (ConA) is a lectin (carbohydrate-binding protein) originally extracted from the jack-bean (Canavalia ensiformis). It is a member of the legume lectin family. It binds specifically to certain structures found in various sugars, glycoproteins, and glycolipids, mainly internal and nonreducing terminal α-D-mannosyl and α-D-glucosyl groups. Its physiological function in plants, however, is still unknown. ConA is a plant mitogen, and is known for its ability to stimulate mouse T-cell subsets giving rise to four functionally distinct T cell populations, including precursors to regulatory T cells; a subset of human suppressor T-cells is also sensitive to ConA. ConA was the first lectin to be available on a commercial basis, and is widely used in biology and biochemistry to characterize glycoproteins and other sugar-containing entities on the surface of various cells. It is also used to purify glycosylated macromolecules in lectin affinity chromatography, as well as to study immune regulation by various immune cells.

== Structure and properties ==
Like most lectins, ConA is a homotetramer: each sub-unit (26.5kDa, 235 amino-acids, heavily glycated) binds a metallic atom (usually Mn^{2+} and a Ca^{2+}). It has the D_{2} symmetry. Its tertiary structure has been elucidated, as have the molecular basis of its interactions with metals as well as its affinity for the sugars mannose and glucose are well known.

ConA binds specifically α-D-mannosyl and α-D-glucosyl residues (two hexoses differing only in the alcohol on carbon 2) in terminal position of ramified structures from B-Glycans (rich in α-mannose, or hybrid and bi-antennary glycan complexes). It has 4 binding sites, corresponding to the 4 sub-units. The molecular weight is 104–112 kDa and the isoelectric point (pI) is in the range of 4.5–5.5.

ConA can also initiate cell division (mitogenesis), primarily acting on T-lymphocytes, by stimulating their energy metabolism within seconds of exposure.

== Maturation process ==
ConA and its variants (found in closely related plants) are the only proteins known to undergo a post-translational sequence arrangement known as Circular permutation in proteins whereby the N-terminal half of the ConA precursor is swapped to become the C-terminal half in the mature form; all other known circular permutations occur at the genetic level. ConA circular permutation is carried out by jack bean asparaginyl endopeptidase, a versatile enzyme capable of cleaving and ligating peptide substrates at a single active site. To convert ConA to the mature form, jack bean asparaginyl endopeptidase cleaves the precursor of ConA in the middle and ligates the two original termini.

== Biological activity ==
Concanavalin A interacts with diverse receptors containing mannose carbohydrates, notably rhodopsin, blood group markers, insulin receptors, the immunoglobulins and the carcino-embryonary antigen (CEA). It also interacts with lipoproteins.

ConA strongly agglutinates erythrocytes irrespective of blood-group, and various cancerous cells. It was demonstrated that transformed cells and trypsin-treated normal cells do not agglutinate at 4 °C, thereby suggesting that there is a temperature-sensitive step involved in ConA-mediated agglutination.

ConA-mediated agglutination of other cell types has been reported, including muscle cells, B-lymphocytes (through surface immunoglobulins), fibroblasts, rat thymocytes, human fetal (but not adult) intestinal epithelial cells, and adipocytes.

ConA is a lymphocyte mitogen. Similar to phytohemagglutinin (PHA), it is a selective T cell mitogen relative to its effects on B cells. PHA and ConA bind and cross-link components of the T cell receptor, and their ability to activate T cells is dependent on expression of the T cell receptor.

ConA interacts with the surface mannose residues of many microbes, including the bacteria E. coli, and Bacillus subtilis and the protist Dictyostelium discoideum.

It has also been shown as a stimulator of several matrix metalloproteinases (MMPs).

ConA has proven useful in applications requiring solid-phase immobilization of glycoenzymes, especially those that have proved difficult to immobilize by traditional covalent coupling. Using ConA-couple matrices, such enzymes may be immobilized in high quantities without a concurrent loss of activity or stability. Such noncovalent ConA-glycoenzyme couplings may be relatively easily reversed by competition with sugars or at acidic pH. If necessary for certain applications, these couplings can be converted to covalent bindings by chemical manipulation.

A report from Taiwan (2009) demonstrated potent therapeutic effect of ConA against experimental hepatoma (liver cancer); in the study by Lei and Chang, ConA was found to be sequestered more by hepatic tumor cells, in preference to surrounding normal hepatocytes. Internalization of ConA occurs preferentially to the mitochondria after binding to cell membrane glycoproteins, which triggers an autophagic cell death. ConA was found to partially inhibit tumor nodule growth independent of its lymphocyte activation; the eradication of the tumor in the murine in-situ hepatoma model in this study was additionally attributed to the mitogenic/lymphoproliferative action of ConA that may have activated a CD8+ T-cell-mediated, as well as NK- and NK-T cell-mediated, immune response in the liver.

ConA intravitreal injection can be used in the modeling of proliferative vitreoretinopathy in rats.

== See also ==
- Concanavalin domain – Protein structural motif
