= Legume lectin =

Legume lectin domain (or L-type lectin domain)
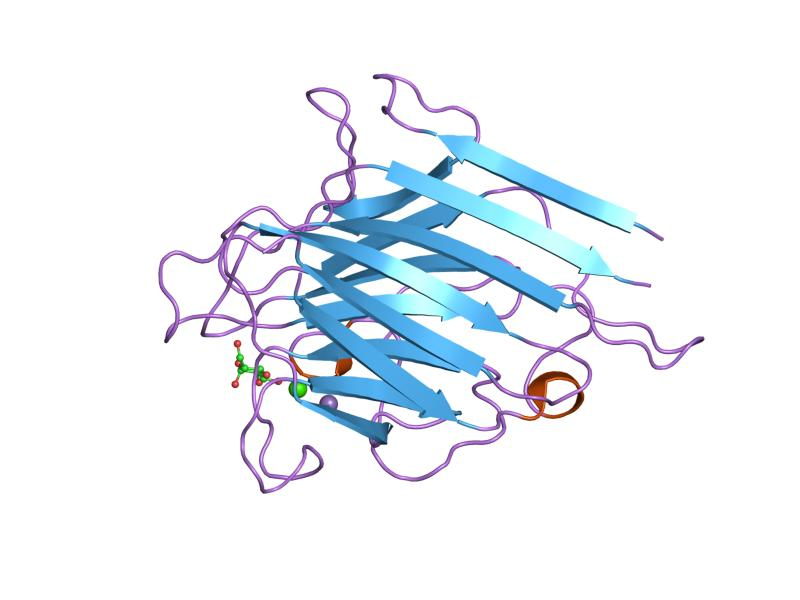
- Structure of the monosaccharide binding site of lentil lectin.

Identifiers
- Symbol: Lectin_legB
- Pfam: PF00139
- Pfam clan: CL0004
- InterPro: IPR001220
- PROSITE: PDOC00278
- SCOP2: 1lem / SCOPe / SUPFAM
Available protein structures:
- PDB: 1apn, 1avb, 1ax0, 1ax1, 1ax2, 1axy, 1axz, 1azd, 1bjq, 1bqp, 1bxh, 1bzw, 1ces, 1ciw, 1cjp, 1cn1, 1con, 1cq9, 1cr7, 1cvn, 1dbn, 1dgl, 1dhk, 1dq0, 1dq1, 1dq2, 1dq4, 1dq5, 1dq6, 1dzq, 1enq, 1enr, 1ens, 1f9k, 1fat, 1fay, 1fny, 1fnz, 1fx5, 1fyu, 1g7y, 1g8w, 1g9f, 1gic, 1gkb, 1gnz, 1gsl, 1gz9, 1gzc, 1h9p, 1h9w, 1hkd, 1hql, 1hqw, 1i3h, 1ioa, 1jbc, 1jn2, 1joj, 1jui, 1jw6, 1jxn, 1jyc, 1jyi, 1lec, 1led, 1lem, 1len, 1les, 1lgb, 1lgc, 1loa, 1lob, 1loc, 1lod, 1loe, 1lof, 1log, 1lte, 1lu1, 1lu2, 1lul, 1mvq, 1n3o, 1n3p, 1n3q, 1n47, 1nls, 1nxd, 1ofs, 1ona, 1q8o, 1q8p, 1q8q, 1q8s, 1q8v, 1qdc, 1qdo, 1qf3, 1qgl, 1qmo, 1qnw, 1qny, 1qoo, 1qos, 1qot, 1rin, 1rir, 1rit, 1s1a, 1sbd, 1sbe, 1sbf, 1scr, 1scs, 1sfy, 1tei, 1ukg, 1uzy, 1uzz, 1v00, 1v6i, 1v6j, 1v6k, 1v6l, 1v6m, 1v6n, 1v6o, 1val, 1vam, 1viw, 1vln, 1wbf, 1wbl, 1wuv, 2a7a, 2ar6, 2arb, 2are, 2arx, 2auy, 2b7y, 2bqp, 2cna, 2ctv, 2cwm, 2cy6, 2cyf, 2d3p, 2d3r, 2d3s, 2d7f, 2dh1, 2dtw, 2dty, 2du0, 2du1, 2dv9, 2dva, 2dvb, 2dvd, 2dvf, 2dvg, 2e51, 2e53, 2e7q, 2e7t, 2ef6, 2eig, 2enr, 2fmd, 2g4i, 2gdf, 2gme, 2gmm, 2gmp, 2gn3, 2gn7, 2gnb, 2gnd, 2gnm, 2gnt, 2jdz, 2je7, 2je9, 2jec, 2lal, 2ltn, 2ovu, 2ow4, 2p2k, 2p34, 2p37, 2pel, 2phf, 2phr, 2pht, 2phu, 2phw, 2phx, 2sba, 2tep, 2uu8, 2zbj, 2zmk, 2zml, 2zmn, 3cna, 3d4k, 3enr, 5cna IPR001220 PF00139 (ECOD; PDBsum)
- AlphaFold: IPR001220; PF00139

The legume lectins (or L-type lectins) are a family of sugar-binding proteins or lectins found in the seeds and, in smaller amounts, in the roots, stems, leaves and bark of plants of the family Fabaceae. The exact function of the legume lectins in vivo is unknown but they are probably involved in the defense of plants against predators. Related proteins in other plant families and in animals have also been found. They have been used for decades as a model system for the study of protein-carbohydrate interactions, because they show a wide variety of binding specificities and are easy to obtain, purify, and characterize the structure of. Well-studied members of this protein family include phytohemagglutinin, soybean agglutinins, and concanavalin A.

== Sugar binding by legume lectins ==
The legume lectins use an ingenious framework for binding specific sugars. This framework consists of a conserved monosaccharide binding site in which four conserved residues from four separate regions in the protein confer affinity (see figure), a variable loop that confers monosaccharide specificity and a number of subsites around the monosaccharide binding site that harbour additional sugar residues or hydrophobic groups.

== Quaternary structure ==
The legume lectins are also interesting from the point of view of protein structure. Despite the conserved structure of the legume lectin subunit, they can adopt a wide range of quaternary structures. The reason behind this remarkable variability is probably to be found in the interaction with multivalent ligands.

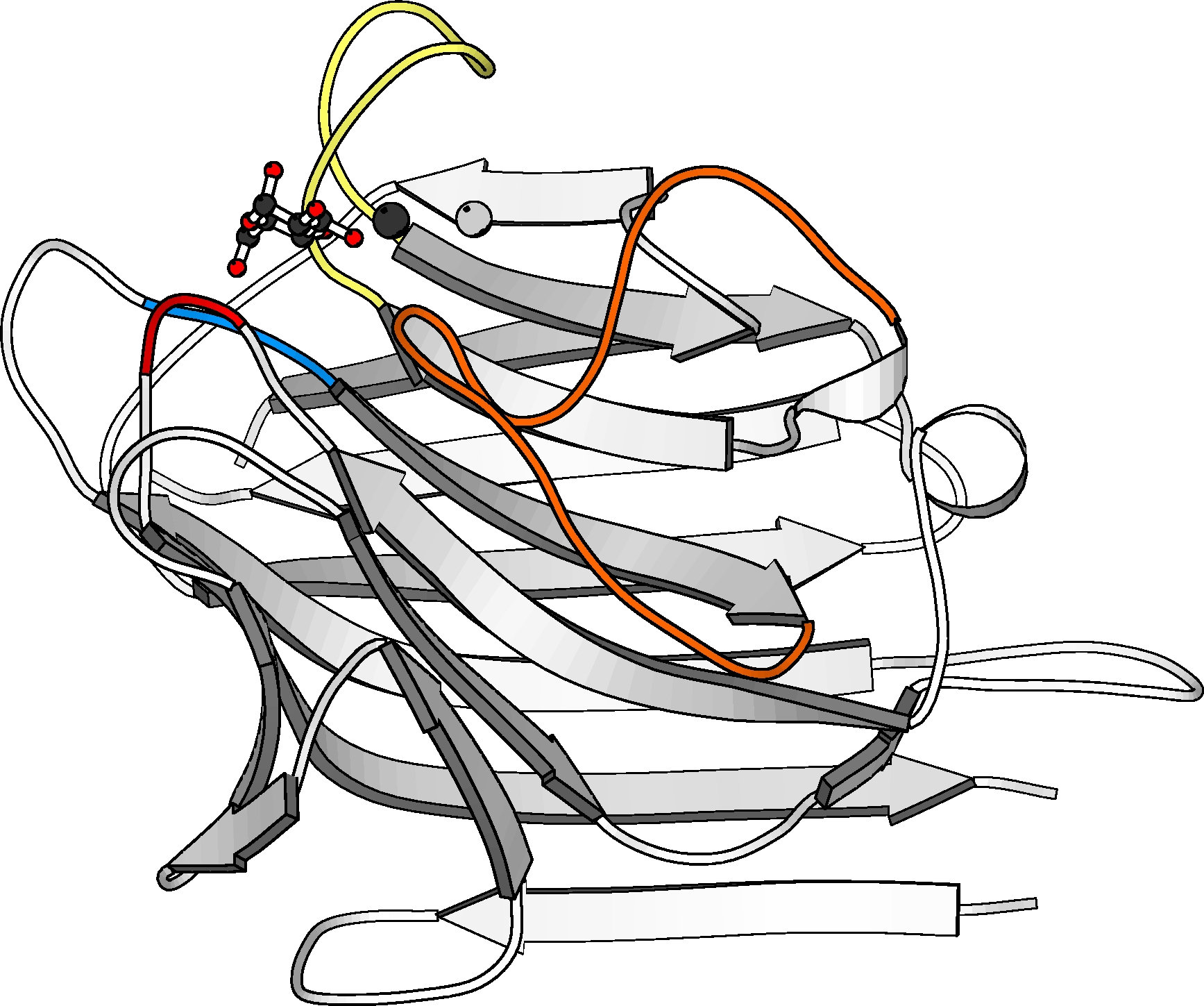
A typical legume lectin monomer (lentil lectin), complexed with a sugar (glucose). The four sugar-binding loops are shown in different colours. The variable loop that confers monosaccharide specificity is shown in orange.

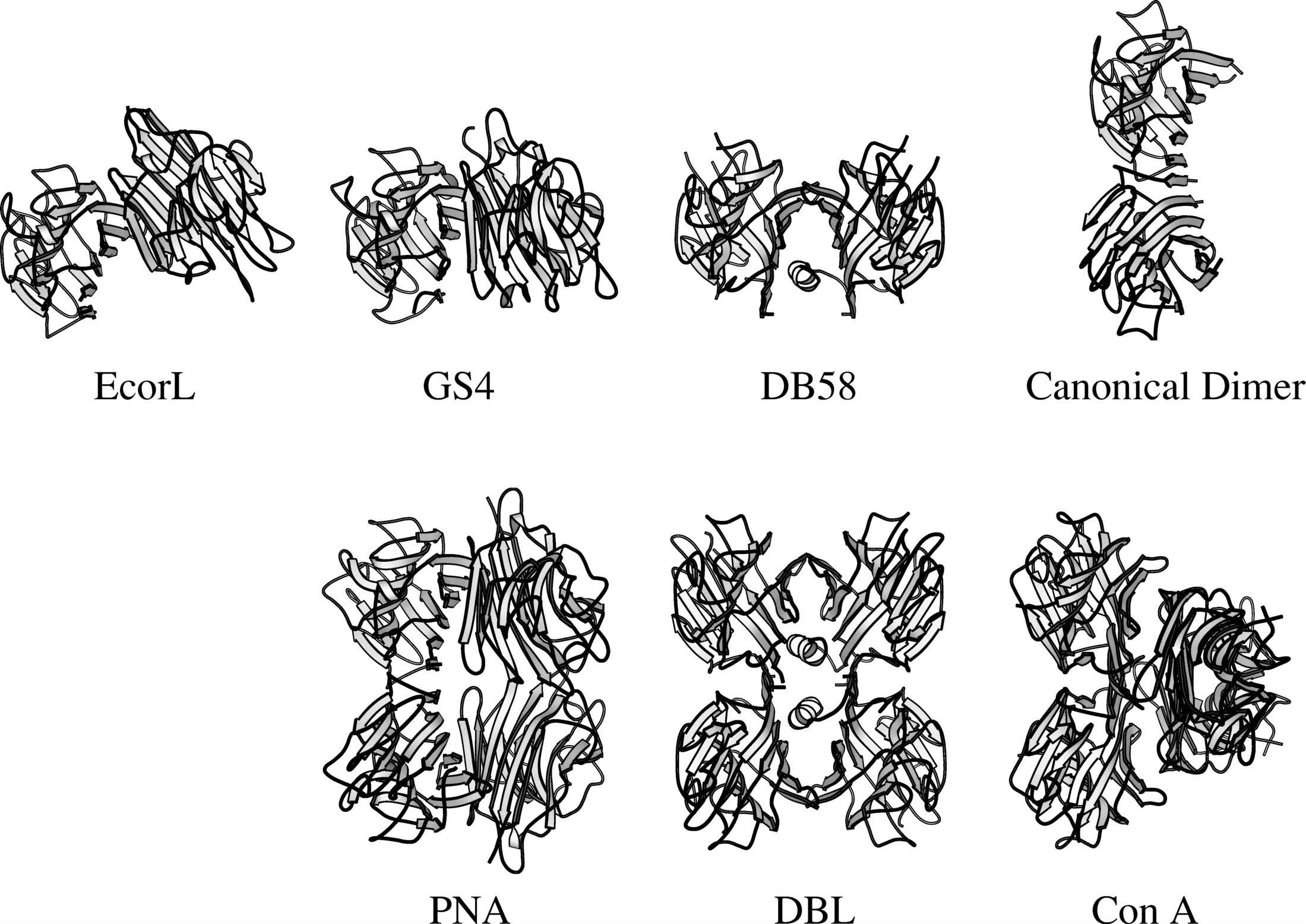
Quaternary structures of some legume lectins. One of the subunits is in the same orientation in all structures for ease of comparison.
