= Glycomimetic =

Glycomimetic is a term used to refer to molecules that have structures similar to carbohydrates, but with some variation. This will normally result in modified biological properties.

== Introduction ==
Often, modification of the structure will take place around the glycosidic linkage. Replacement of one or other of the glycosidic oxygen atoms by carbon, sulfur, nitrogen etc. will alter the properties of the glycosidic bond. The molecules produced in this way would be called carbasugars or C-glycosides, thiosugars or thioglycosides, or iminosugars or glycosylamines.

When nitrogen is introduced, the glycomimetic may become positively charged at physiological pH, meaning that it may act as an enzyme inhibitor, either by Coulombic interaction with carboxylate amino acid side-chains in the enzyme active site, or by mimicking positive-charge build-up at the transition state of the reaction, or both. Iminosugars (sometimes referred to erroneously as azasugars) are classic examples of molecules with this behaviour. Glycosylamines typically have a lower stability, being easily hydrolysed, which means that to exploit an exocyclic nitrogen substituent at C-1, further modification is necessary. An example of this would be the additional substitution of the ring-oxygen for carbon as is seen in valienamine.

Altering the structure of a carbohydrate will normally result in several changes to the properties of the molecule. As well as changing the stability of the glycosidic bond, the ring-conformation may be affected. Also the conformation of the glycosidic bond may be affected. As well as obvious changes in the immediate vicinity of the substitution, e.g. that replacement of an acetal oxygen by methylene (CH2) would result in loss of a hydrogen-bond participatory atom, such a substitution is expected to have more subtle effects resulting from a change in the dipole of the molecule, such as slight changes in hydrogen bonding or pKa values of the unchanged hydroxyl groups. Substitution by CF2 rather than methylene has been explored in efforts to address this and come up with better mimetics while still retaining the hydrolytic stability gained by the modification.

== Examples of commercially relevant glycomimetic molecules ==
=== Tamiflu ===
Tamiflu is a carbocyclic mimic of the cell-surface carbohydrate sialic acid. Tamiflu is an enzyme inhibitor that blocks the action of influenza virus neuraminidases (sialidases).

=== Acarbose ===
Acarbose is a pseudotetrasaccharide mimicking maltotetraose (a substructure of starch). One of the glucose units has been replaced by valienamine - a carbasugar, linked to the next carbohydrate by an amine bridge. Another of the glucose units appears as a 6-deoxy variant. Acarbose is an enzyme inhibitor that is used as a drug against type 2 diabetes.

=== Miglustat ===
Miglustat is an iminosugar in which the ring oxygen is replaced by nitrogen. Miglustat a drug used to treat some rare lysosomal storage disorder diseases.
