= Phytohaemagglutinin =

Toxic lectin

Legume lectin domain
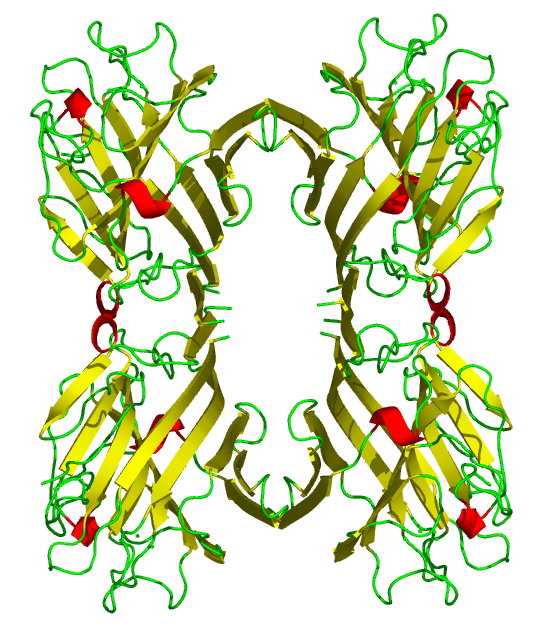
- Crystal structure of PHA-L (PDB 1fat)

Identifiers
- Symbol: Lectin_legB
- Pfam: PF00139
- Pfam clan: CL0004
- InterPro: IPR001220
- PROSITE: PDOC00278
- SCOP2: 1lem / SCOPe / SUPFAM
Available protein structures:
- PDB: IPR001220 PF00139 (ECOD; PDBsum)
- AlphaFold: IPR001220; PF00139

Phytohaemagglutinin (PHA, or phytohemagglutinin) is a lectin found in plants, especially certain legumes. PHA actually consists of two closely related proteins, called leucoagglutinin (PHA-L) and PHA-E. These proteins cause blood cells to clump together. PHA-E cause erythrocytes (red blood cells) to clump. PHA-L causes leukocytes (white blood cells) to clump. Phytohaemagglutinin has carbohydrate-binding specificity for a complex oligosaccharide containing galactose, N-acetylglucosamine, and mannose.

PHA is found in the highest concentrations in uncooked red kidney beans (Phaseolus vulgaris) and another variety of Phaseolus vulgaris, white kidney beans (also known as cannellini), and it is also found in lower quantities in many other types of common green beans, such as broad beans (Vicia faba) also known as fava beans. PHA has a number of physiological effects and is used in medical research. In high doses, it is a toxin.

The lectin has a number of effects on cell metabolism; it induces mitosis, and affects the cell membrane in regard to transport and permeability to proteins. It agglutinates most mammalian red blood cell types.

== Toxicity ==
As a toxin, PHA can cause poisoning in monogastric animals, such as humans, through the consumption of raw or improperly prepared legumes, e.g., beans. Measured in haemagglutinating units (hau), a raw red kidney bean may contain up to 70,000 hau, but this is reduced to between 200 and 400 hau when properly cooked. Studies by British scientists recommend soaking beans for at least five hours, discarding the water, and then boiling the beans in fresh water at 100 °C (212 °F) for at least thirty minutes. A pressure cooker at 15 psi may be used to cook beans in 45 minutes without presoaking. Insufficient cooking, such as in a slow cooker at 75 °C/ 167 °F, may not completely destroy the toxins.

Beans also contain alpha amylase inhibitor, but not in sufficient quantities to affect the digestion of starch after consumption of beans.

Symptoms can be induced from as few as four to five raw beans. Symptoms usually begin with extreme nausea and vomiting within one to three hours of ingestion, followed by diarrhea. Abdominal pain has been reported in some people. Recovery is usually spontaneous and rapid, occurring within three to four hours after onset of symptoms, although some cases have required hospitalization.

== Uses ==
=== Lymphocyte division ===
In medicine these proteins are useful and are used as a mitogen to trigger T-lymphocyte cell division and to activate latent HIV-1 from human peripheral lymphocytes. Lymphocytes cultured with phytohaemagglutinin can be used for karyotype analysis. Stimulation of peripheral blood lymphocytes by phytohaemagglutinin presents a classic model of transition of cells from the quiescent G_{0} phase of the cell cycle into G1-, and subsequently progression through S-, G2- and M- phases of the cycle.

PHA activates T cells by binding to sugars on glycosylated surface proteins including the T cell receptor. Binding by PHA crosslinks these proteins, causing T cell activation and the downstream NFAT pathway. HIV-1 replication is enhanced with T cell activation, hence the observed ability to activate the virus from latency.

=== Neuron tracing ===
In neuroscience, anterograde tracing is a research method that uses the protein product phytohaemagglutinin PHA-L as a molecular tracer that can be taken up by the cell and transported across the synapse into the next cell thereby tracing the path of axonal projections and relative connections that nerve impulses travel beginning with the source located at the perikaryon (cell body or soma) and through the presynaptic part located on neuron's efferent axon all the way to the point of termination at the efferent synapse which then provides input to another neuron.

== History ==
Prior to 1960, crude extracts of PHA were known to coat the surface of red blood cells, make them heavier, and thereby improve the separation of the white cell buffy coat. Peter Nowell, an immunologist and pathologist at the University of Pennsylvania in Philadelphia, was using PHA for this purpose in 1960 when he discovered it also had the ability to stimulate mitotic division of lymphocytes from normal peripheral blood. Prior to his discovery, these cells were assumed to be the terminal end-products of differentiation. This work had tremendous implications for the constitutional study of chromosomal disorders.
