= Lectin =

Carbohydrate-binding protein

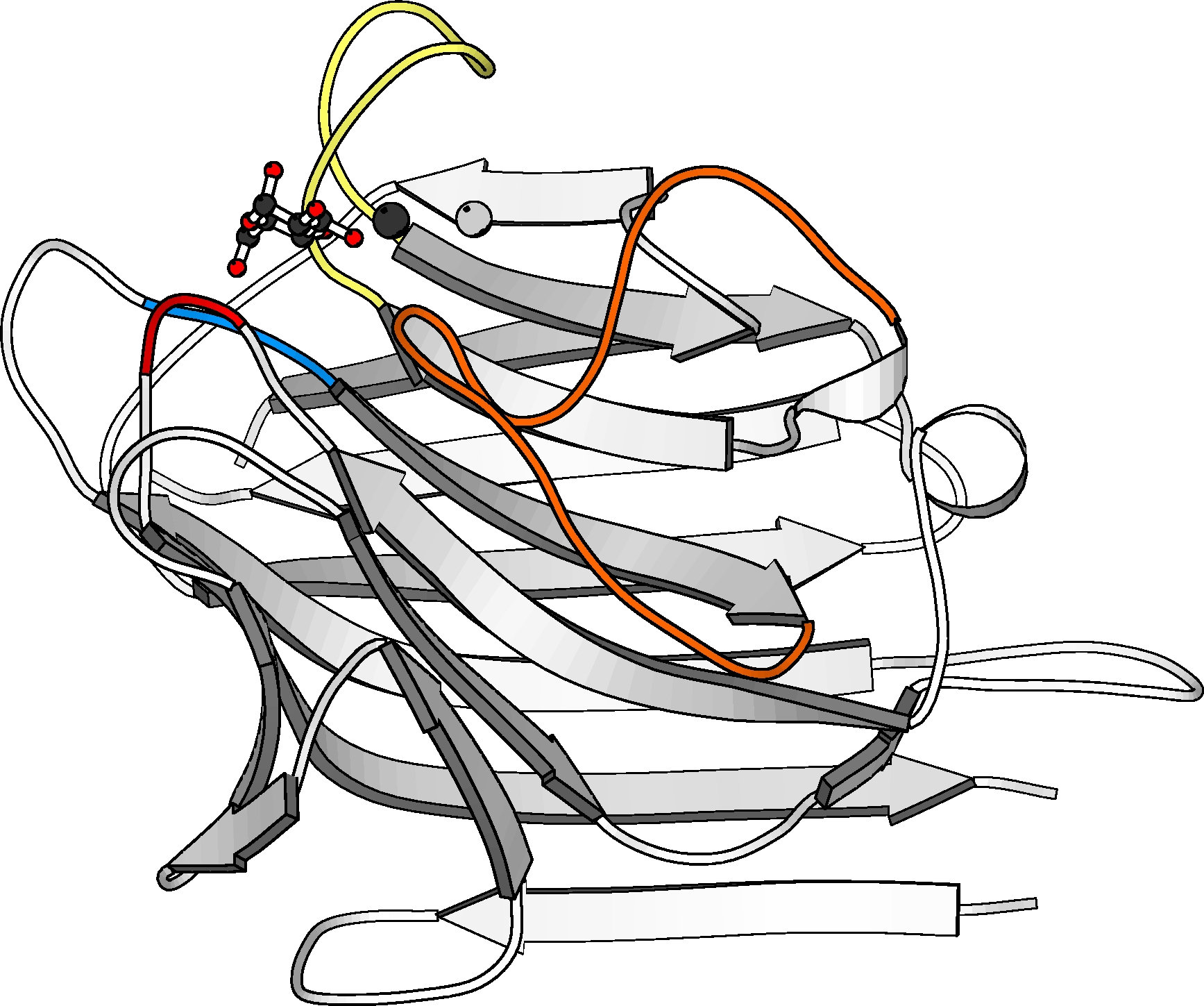
A typical legume lectin monomer (lentil lectin), complexed with a sugar (glucose). The four sugar-binding loops are shown in different colours. The variable loop that confers monosaccharide specificity is shown in orange.

Lectins are carbohydrate-binding proteins that are highly specific for sugar groups that are part of sugars and other molecules. Lectins can recognize specific types of sugar moieties and play a role in the recognition of carbohydrates and glycosylated proteins. This recognition is used within organisms to mediate binding between specific cell types, to recognize chemical messages, and to recognize foreign cells: for example, the human lectin CLEC11A conveys a signal for bone growth. Lectins are also used by pathogens such as bacteria, viruses, and fungi to recognize and tightly attach to their host cells.

Because lectin binds sugar moieties, it can "glue" together entities that have similar sugar moieties. Many cells have specific types of surface glycans; when a lectin is added, they become glued together or agglutinated. Glycoconjugates and polysaccharides that share similar moieties can likewise be glued together, making them precipitate out of a solution. By using the correct lectin, one can separate out entities that have a certain sugar moiety. This is useful for the determination of blood type and separating cells by type. Because a lectin molecule can only bind a handful of sugar groups, it can be disabled by an excess of the sugar group that it recognizes.

Lectins are found in all domains and kingdoms of life, from the prokaryotes to the eukaryotes, from the plants to the animals. The need to recognize sugars is commonly encountered in nature and lectins have independently evolved many times, so that proteins that act as "lectins" come in many structurally distinct folds. The functionality of lectins have also evolved beyond simple recognition: "legume-type" lectins act as toxins to deter predation (with the most famous example being phytohaemagglutinin from legumes) while the separate ricin-type lectin serves to guide the catalytic A chain into victim cells.

== Etymology ==
William C. Boyd alone and then together with Elizabeth Shapleigh introduced the term "lectin" in 1954 from the Latin word lectus, "chosen" (from the verb legere, to choose or pick out).

== Biological functions ==
Lectins may bind to a soluble carbohydrate or to a carbohydrate moiety that is a part of a glycoprotein or glycolipid. They typically agglutinate certain animal cells and/or precipitate glycoconjugates. Most lectins do not possess enzymatic activity.

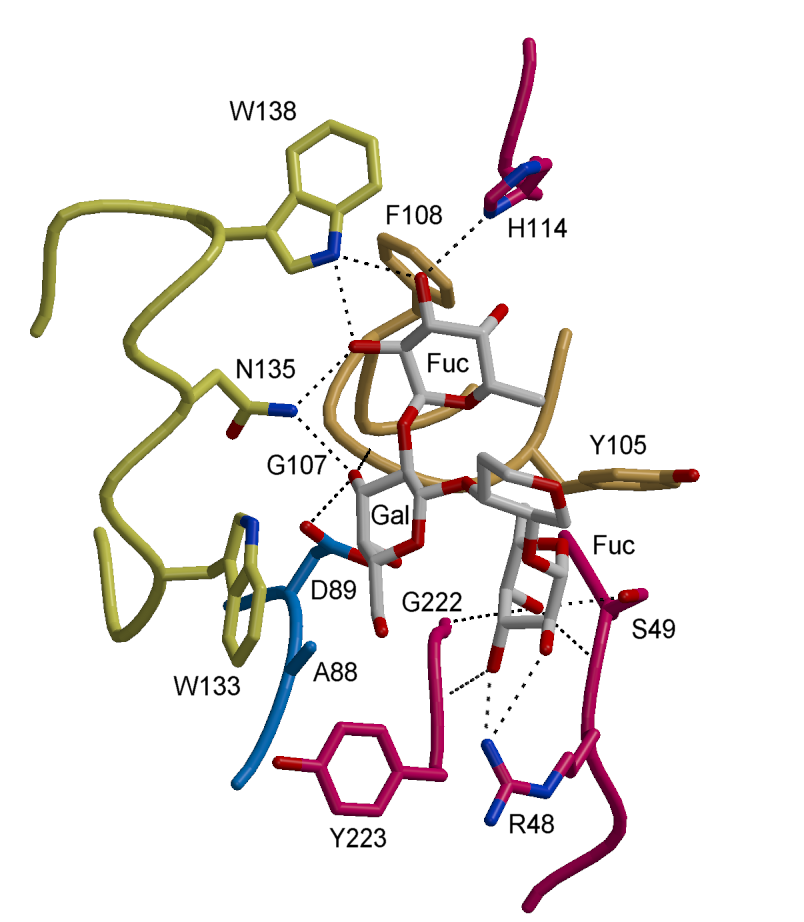
An oligosaccharide (shown in grey) bound in the binding site of a plant lectin (Griffonia simplicifolia isolectin IV in complex with the Lewis b blood group determinant); only a part of the oligosaccharide (central, in grey) is shown for clarity.

=== Animals ===
Lectins have these functions in animals:

- The regulation of cell adhesion
- The regulation of glycoprotein synthesis
- The regulation of blood protein levels
- The binding of soluble extracellular and intercellular glycoproteins
- As a receptor on the surface of mammalian liver cells for the recognition of galactose residues, which results in removal of certain glycoproteins from the circulatory system
- As a receptor that recognizes hydrolytic enzymes containing mannose-6-phosphate, and targets these proteins for delivery to the lysosomes; I-cell disease is one type of defect in this particular system.
- Lectins are known to play important roles in the innate immune system.
  - C-type lectins such as the mannose-binding lectin, help mediate the first-line defense against invading microorganisms. Other immune lectins play a role in self-nonself discrimination and they likely modulate inflammatory and autoreactive processes.
  - Intelectins (X-type lectins) bind microbial glycans and may function in the innate immune system as well. Lectins may be involved in pattern recognition and pathogen elimination in the innate immunity of vertebrates including fishes.

=== Plants ===
==== Legume-type ====
Plant lectins
Lectin Symbol	Lectin name	Source	Accession	Ligand motif	Structural family
Mannose-binding lectins
ConA	Concanavalin A	Canavalia ensiformis		α-D-mannosyl and α-D-glucosyl residues; branched α-mannosidic structures (high α-mannose type, or hybrid type and biantennary complex type N-Glycans)	Legume
LCH	Lentil lectin	Lens culinaris		Fucosylated core region of bi- and triantennary complex type N-Glycans	Legume
GNA	Snowdrop lectin	Galanthus nivalis		α 1-3 and α 1-6 linked high mannose structures	Bulb
Galactose / N-acetylgalactosamine binding lectins
RCA	Ricin B R. c. agglutinin	Ricinus communis		Galβ1-4GalNAcβ1-R	Ricin
PNA	Peanut agglutinin	Arachis hypogaea		Galβ1-3GalNAcα1-Ser/Thr (T-Antigen)	Legume
AIL	Jacalin	Artocarpus integrifolius		(Sia)Galβ1-3GalNAcα1-Ser/Thr (T-Antigen)	Jacalin
VVL	Hairy vetch lectin	Vicia villosa		GalNAcα-Ser/Thr (Tn-Antigen)	Legume
N-acetylglucosamine binding lectins
WGA	Wheat germ agglutinin	Triticum vulgaris	\	GlcNAcβ1-4GlcNAcβ1-4GlcNAc; Neu5Ac (sialic acid)	Chitinase-like
N-acetylneuraminic acid binding lectins
SNA	Elderberry lectin	Sambucus nigra	O04072	Neu5Acα2-6Gal(NAc)-R	Ricin
MAL	M. a. leukoagglutinin	Maackia amurensis	P0DKL3	Neu5Ac/Gcα2,3Galβ1,4Glc(NAc)	Legume
MAH	M. a. hemoagglutinin	Maackia amurensis	Q7M1M0	Neu5Ac/Gcα2,3Galβ1,3(Neu5Acα2,6)GalNac	Legume
Fucose binding lectins
UEA	U. e. agglutinin	Ulex europaeus	P22972	Fucα1-2Gal-R	Legume
AAL	A. a. lectin	Aleuria aurantia	P22972	Fucα1-2Galβ1-4(Fucα1-3/4)Galβ1-4GlcNAc, R2-GlcNAcβ1-4(Fucα1-6)GlcNAc-R1	Fungal

The "legume lectins" refer to a family of lectins found in plants, originally found in legumes but later shown to be present in non-legume plants as well. The function of them is still uncertain. Once thought to be necessary for rhizobia binding, this proposed function was ruled out through lectin-knockout transgene studies.

The large concentration of lectins in plant seeds decreases with growth, and suggests a role in plant germination and perhaps in the seed's survival itself. The binding of glycoproteins on the surface of parasitic cells also is believed to be a function. Several plant lectins have been found to recognize noncarbohydrate ligands that are primarily hydrophobic in nature, including adenine, auxins, cytokinin, and indole acetic acid, as well as water-soluble porphyrins. These interactions may be physiologically relevant, since some of these molecules function as phytohormones.

Lectin receptor kinases (LecRKs) are believed to recognize damage associated molecular patterns (DAMPs), which are created or released from herbivore attack. In Arabidopsis, legume-type LecRKs Clade 1 has 11 LecRK proteins. LecRK-1.8 has been reported to recognize extracellular NAD molecules and LecRK-1.9 has been reported to recognize extracellular ATP molecules.

Extraction of proteins and lectins can be extracted via similar processes, also with their analysis, and discovery. For example cottonseed contains compounds of interest within the studies of extraction and purification of proteins

==== Other types ====
Ricin is a two-component (AB) toxin made up of an A chain and the B chain, which form a tight heterodimer. The B chain is a lectin that binds to the surface of victim cells, triggering the internalization of the heterodimer. After the complex enters the cell, the catalytic A chain performs the function of depurinating ribosomal RNA, causing the inactivation of ribosomes.

=== Bacteria and viruses ===
Some hepatitis C viral glycoproteins may attach to host-produced C-type lectins on the liver cell surface to initiate infection. Mannose-binding lectin (MBL), a component of the innate immune system, paradoxically enhances Ebola cell entry.

Some viruses, including influenza and several viruses in the Paramyxoviridae family, use a lectin (see Hemagglutinin § Viruses) to attach to tissue-specific glycans on host cell-surface glycoproteins and glycolipids. This allows them to gain entry into target cells. Pathogenic bacteria express surface lectins known as adhesins, similarly tuned to recognize target cells. These proteins help the bacteria adhere to its victim and establish a foodhold. Bacterial adhesins/lectins also play a role in keeping the bacterium attached to the biofilm, which typically has a carbohydrate framework.

== Use ==
=== In medicine and medical research ===
Purified lectins are important in a clinical setting because they are used for blood typing. Some of the glycolipids and glycoproteins on an individual's red blood cells can be identified by lectins.

- A lectin from Dolichos biflorus is used to identify cells that belong to the A1 blood group.
- A lectin from Ulex europaeus is used to identify the H blood group antigen.
- A lectin from Vicia graminea is used to identify the N blood group antigen.
- A lectin from Iberis amara is used to identify the M blood group antigen.

In neuroscience, the anterograde labeling method is used to trace the path of efferent axons with PHA-L, a lectin from the kidney bean.

A lectin (BanLec) from bananas inhibits HIV-1 in vitro. Achylectins, isolated from Tachypleus tridentatus, show specific agglutinating activity against human A-type erythrocytes. Anti-B agglutinins such as anti-BCJ and anti-BLD separated from Charybdis japonica and Lymantria dispar, respectively, are of value both in routine blood grouping and research.

The fucose-binding lectin LecB of Pseudomonas aeruginosa, which contributes to bacterial adhesion and biofilm formation, has been investigated as a molecular target using photoswitchable glycomimetic ligands. One such ligand, photofucose-2, showed different binding affinities for LecB in its cis and trans forms, and the protein–ligand complex was characterized by X-ray crystallography.

=== In studying carbohydrate recognition by proteins ===
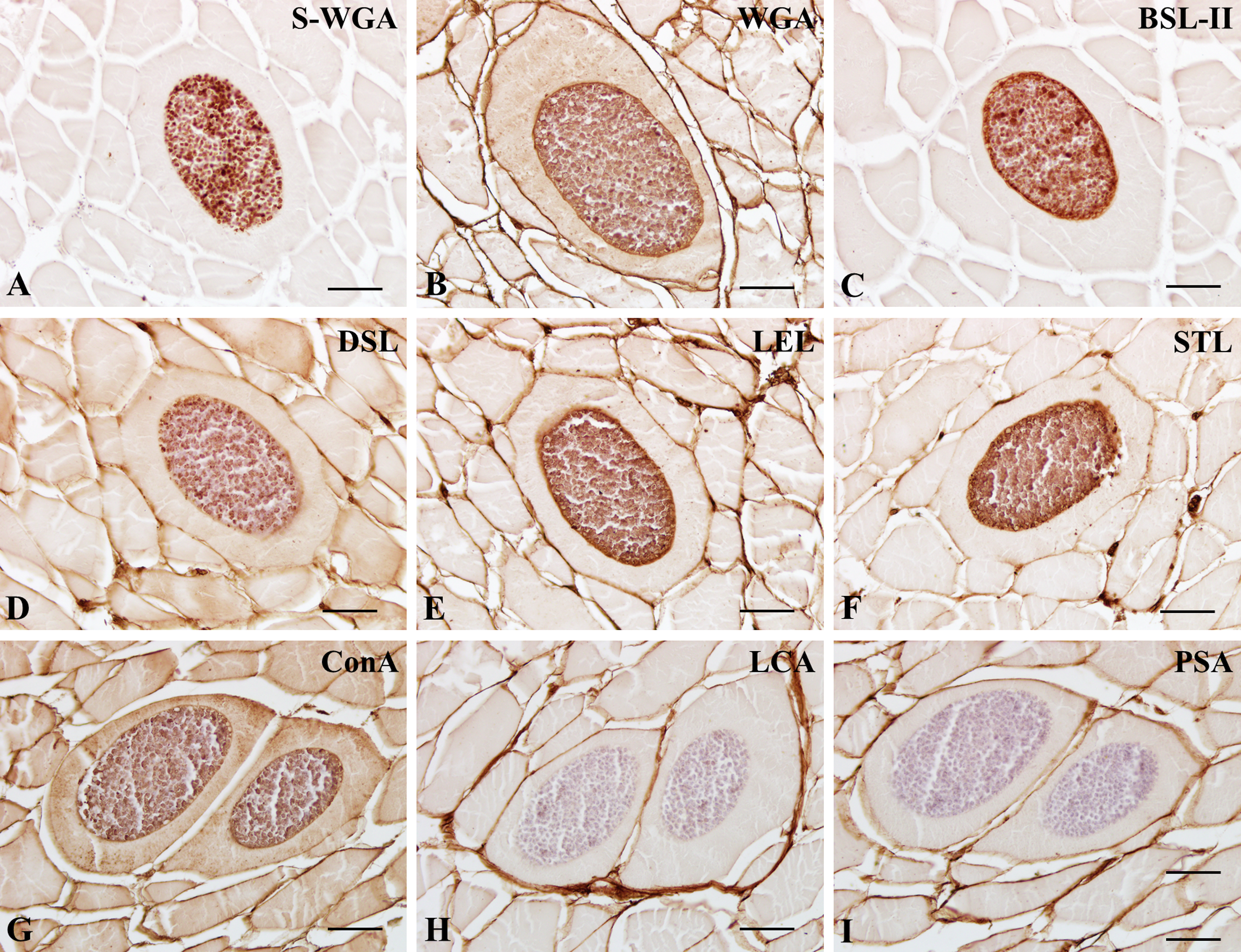
Lectin histochemistry of fish muscles infected by a myxozoan

Lectins from legume plants, such as PHA or concanavalin A, have been used widely as model systems to understand the molecular basis of how proteins recognize carbohydrates, because they are relatively easy to obtain and have a wide variety of sugar specificities. The many crystal structures of legume lectins have led to a detailed insight of the atomic interactions between carbohydrates and proteins.

Legume seed lectins have been studied for their insecticidal potential and have shown harmful effects for the development of pest.

=== As a biochemical tool ===
Concanavalin A and other commercially available lectins have been used widely in affinity chromatography for purifying glycoproteins.

In general, proteins may be characterized with respect to glycoforms and carbohydrate structure by means of affinity chromatography, blotting, affinity electrophoresis, and affinity immunoelectrophoreis with lectins, as well as in microarrays, as in evanescent-field fluorescence-assisted lectin microarray.

=== In biochemical warfare ===
One example of the powerful biological attributes of lectins is the biochemical warfare agent ricin. The protein ricin is isolated from seeds of the castor oil plant and comprises two protein domains:

- One domain is a lectin that binds cell surface galactosyl residues and enables the protein to enter cells.
- The second domain is an N-glycosidase that cleaves nucleobases from ribosomal RNA, resulting in inhibition of protein synthesis and cell death.

Abrin from the jequirity pea is similar.

== Dietary lectin ==
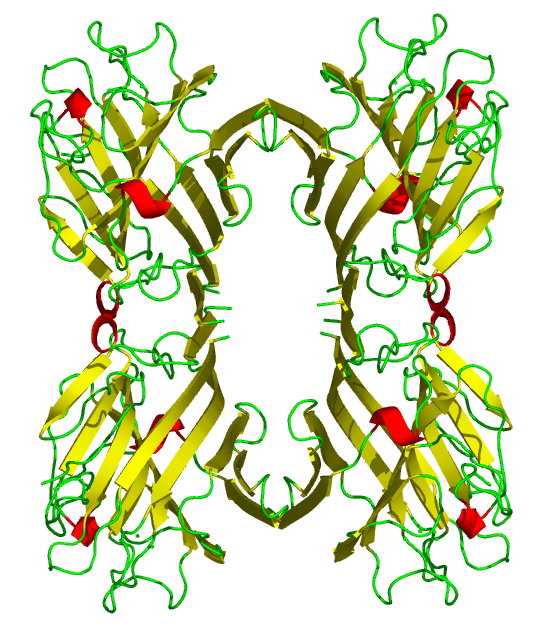
Leucoagglutinin is a toxic phytohemagglutinin found in raw Vicia faba (fava bean).

Lectins are widespread in nature, and many foods contain the proteins. Some lectins can be harmful if poorly cooked or consumed in great quantities. They are most potent when raw because boiling, stewing or soaking in water for several hours can render most lectins inactive. Cooking raw beans at low heat, though, such as in a slow cooker, will not remove all the lectins.

Some studies have found that lectins may interfere with absorption of some minerals, such as calcium, iron, phosphorus, and zinc. The binding of lectins to cells in the digestive tract may disrupt the breakdown and absorption of some nutrients, and as they bind to cells for long periods of time, some theories hold that they may play a role in certain inflammatory conditions such as rheumatoid arthritis and type 1 diabetes, but research supporting claims of long-term health effects in humans is limited and most existing studies have focused on developing countries where malnutrition may be a factor, or dietary choices are otherwise limited.

=== Lectin-free diet ===
The first writer to advocate a lectin-free diet was Peter J. D'Adamo, a naturopath best known for promoting the blood type diet. He argued that lectins may damage a person's blood type by interfering with digestion, food metabolism, hormones, insulin production—and so should be avoided. D'Adamo provided no scientific evidence nor published data for his claims, and his diet has been criticized for making inaccurate statements about biochemistry.

Steven Gundry proposed a lectin-free diet in his book The Plant Paradox (2017). It excludes a large range of commonplace foods including whole grains, legumes, and most fruit, as well as the nightshade vegetables: tomatoes, potatoes, eggplant, bell peppers, and chili peppers. Gundry's claims about lectins are considered pseudoscience. His book cites studies that have nothing to do with lectins, and some that show—contrary to his own recommendations—that avoiding the whole grains wheat, barley, and rye will allow increase of harmful bacteria while diminishing helpful bacteria. Gundry commonly uses arguments to the effect of "[p]lants don’t want to be eaten. They simply want to survive", despite the fact that around 96% of all fruiting and seed-producing plants (i.e., angiosperms and gymnosperms) have specifically evolved to rely on animal consumption of their fruits and seeds in order to expand their reproductive range and avoid parent-offspring conflicts over nearby resources. Like pollination, this process (known as zoochory) is a kind of mutualism. Seeds and fruits are specifically adapted to being consumed by animals in pursuit of this seed dispersal.

== Toxicity ==
=== Hemagglutination ===
Lectins are a common culprit of pathologic clumping of red blood cells, known as hemagglutination. Red blood cells (RBCs) exhibit a variety of carbohydrate-bearing antigens (mainly glycoproteins) on their external surface, such as the ABO bloog group and other red cell antigens, among many others. Lectins which bind to two or more of these carbohydrate moieties will quickly cross-link huge numbers of RBCs, leading to large cellular aggregates.

=== In plant foods ===
As a category, most lectins are benign in human consumption due to simply not binding carbohydrate structures found in human tissues. Nevertheless, some lectins are toxic to humans and some of these are present in commony consumed foods, particulary in beans. Typical food preparation methods are sufficient to remove the health effects of these plant lectins (also called phytohemagglutinins), such as their dissolution and removal in cold-water leaching, their denaturation in various methods of heat cooking, or their metabolism in fermentation. Methods of increasing food edibility, including removing toxins such as lectins or tannins, are commonly understood to be the cultural evolutionary origin of most traditional food preparation methods. Adverse effects of red kidney bean lectins include nutritional deficiencies, and immune (allergic) reactions.

In January 2026, the European Food Safety Authority (EFSA) published a report analyzing the potential health effects of plant lectins in human food consumption, as requested by the European Commission due to several EU member states (such as the Federal Institute for Risk Assessment in Germany) listing public health recommendations on safe food preparation related to plant lectins and the lack of an EU-level advisory on the matter. The EFSA carried out an extensive review of the available scientific literature, performing systematic reviews on both human and animal data, as well studying toxicology and clinical records on human exposure incidents. With the exception of raw and undercooked beans, the report found no evidence support a risk assessment of lectin-based health effects from food. In the case of beans, a model of insufficient cooking where 50% of lectin binding activity was removed was sufficient to justify a risk of negative health effects, thus the report included a risk assessment for the consumption of undercooked beans.

== History ==
The earliest description of a lectin is believed to have been given by Peter Hermann Stillmark in his doctoral thesis presented in 1888 to the Imperial University of Dorpat. Stillmark isolated ricin, an extremely toxic hemagglutinin, from seeds of the castor plant (Ricinus communis). Although lectins were first discovered in plants, they are now known to be present throughout nature.

The first lectin to be purified on a large scale and available on a commercial basis was concanavalin A, which is now the most-used lectin for characterization and purification of sugar-containing molecules and cellular structures. The legume lectins are probably the most well-studied lectins.

Long before a deeper understanding of their numerous biological functions was developed, the plant lectins, also known as phytohemagglutinins, were noted for their particularly high specificity for foreign glycoconjugates (e.g., those of fungi and animals) and used in biomedicine for blood cell testing and in biochemistry for fractionation.

== See also ==
- Glycan-protein interactions
- Bacillus thuringiensis
- Lectin pathway, ficolin
- Toxalbumin
