= Boris Korczak =

Polish-American CIA operative

Boris Sielicki-Korczak ([ɕɛˈlit͡ski kɔrt͡ʂak]; born February 11, 1939) is a Polish national and United States citizen, who worked as a CIA field operative between 1973 and 1979.

== Personal life ==
Korczak was born in Vilnius, Polish-Lithuania on February 11, 1939, shortly before the start of World War II. He married Barbara Sielicki-Korczak (née Kaniewski) in 1971 and is a father of two children, Robert Sielicki-Korczak (born 1973) and Sandra Sielicki-Korczak (born 1978).

== Polish Underground and escape from Poland ==
As a teenager, Korczak joined up with the Polish Underground who sought out, punished and killed Soviets and their Polish agents who were responsible for torturing and killing Polish political prisoners. His anti-Soviet activities landed him in prison for 3 years as an "Enemy of the Polish People's Republic", which was Communist at the time. After an attempted suicide and the infection that followed, he was released into his mother's custody as he was expected to die. His original sentence was death, but due to his young age of 17 years, it was reduced to prison time. On Friday, October 13, 1964, he escaped Communist Poland and fled to Denmark. That same year, the King of Denmark issued him the Status of Political Refugee.

== CIA years (1973–1979) ==
In 1973 Korczak began to work in Europe as an Access Agent for the Central Intelligence Agency. He was stationed in Copenhagen, Denmark with an Electronics Import/Export business as his front. Being multilingual, and fluent in Russian, made him a natural choice to infiltrate the KGB and became a double agent. By 1979, he had attained the rank of Major within the KGB.

In 1979 Korczak was exposed as a double agent. In November 1979, the October Revolution Celebration Reception was being held inside the Soviet Embassy in Copenhagen, Denmark. During this reception, Korczak's intoxicated Chief of Station (who was officially an American Diplomat) admitted that Korczak was spying for the CIA after being provoked by the KGB officer.

== Aftermath ==
Upon realising that his status as a double agent had been exposed, Korczak, at this point worried about potential threats to himself, his friends, and his family, notified the CIA. Several years later, Congressman James Traficant of Ohio and Senator Charles Grassley of Iowa independently investigated Korczak's case, which resulted in confirmation of Korczak's claims. Subsequently, he gave interviews on multiple radio and TV programmes, such as "The Tom Snyder Show", and "The Morton Downey Jr. Show".

== Assassination attempt ==
In August 1981, Korczak was shot with a ricin-laced pellet while shopping in Giant Food store in Vienna, Virginia. At the time he thought that a bee had stung him but three hours later he started becoming deathly ill. Hospital records indicate that his white blood cell count was four times the normal amount yet no infection could be detected.

Korczak's symptoms tormented him severely for several months. Shortly after being shot, Korczak felt as though he were passing a kidney stone and urinated through a coffee filter, finding a small blood-clotted object. After closer inspection, it was revealed to be a cross-drilled platinum-iridium pellet, smaller than the head of a pin, containing the poison ricin. The pellet was professionally photographed and sent to Scotland Yard.

It was then that Korczak understood that the assassination attempt on him was very similar to the infamous "umbrella shooting" murder of Georgi Markov, by a small air-powered "gun" built into an umbrella.

== Legal battles ==
In 1996, Korczak filed a lawsuit against the Central Intelligence Agency for violating the terms of his contract, back pay with interest and for the pension he was promised once his work for the Agency was through.

The case was thrown out by the Federal Court of Claims when Government lawyers cited the "Totten Doctrine" which basically meant that the CIA was choosing not to be sued because State Secrets could end up in public domain if any such secret documents ended up being used as evidence in the court case.

The case was reported on by many foreign and domestic news outlets in print, television and radio media.
