= List of incidents involving ricin =

This is a list of incidents involving the poison ricin. The incidents are predominantly attempts to use the poison for attacks, rather than accidents and non-criminal events.

== 1970s ==
=== September 1978, London, UK, assassination of Georgi Markov ===
On September 7, 1978, Bulgarian dissident Georgi Markov was jabbed in the leg in public on Waterloo Bridge, London by a man using a weapon built into an umbrella which fired a small pellet carrying ricin into Markov's leg. Markov died four days later.

== 1980s ==
=== August 1981, Vienna, Virginia, US, assassination attempt on Boris Korczak ===
On August 14, 1981, CIA agent Boris Korczak, who had infiltrated the KGB but had been exposed, was shot like Georgi Markov with some sort of weapon that fired a minuscule pellet containing a potentially lethal dose of ricin into his kidney while he was shopping at Giant Food Store in Vienna, Virginia. Korczak and the CIA are convinced that this assassination attempt was the work of the KGB, as he had penetrated it deeply and harmed it significantly. Korczak survived, which he attributes to being shot in the kidney, causing his body to expel the projectile as though it were a kidney stone before it could kill him.

== 1990s ==
=== December 1995, Onia, Arkansas, US ===
In April 1993, Thomas Lavy was caught while trying to smuggle 130 grams of ricin from Alaska into Canada. Lavy stated that he purchased the ricin to poison coyotes on his farm in Arkansas and keep them away from his chickens. Lavy was stopped at the Beaver Creek border crossing by Canadian custom agents who found, along with the 130 grams of ricin, $89,000, a knife, four guns, and 20,000 rounds of ammunition.

=== January 1997, Janesville, Wisconsin, US ===
Authorities discovered various toxic substances in the house of Thomas Leahy in Janesville, Wisconsin. They discovered the substances after they had been called to Leahy's home after he had shot his son in the face, following a night of drinking. Among the chemicals discovered were 0.67 grams of ricin and nicotine mixed with a solvent that allowed it to penetrate the skin and have lethal effects. Authorities also found books relating to the production of chemical and biological agents. Chemicals were also found in a storage shed that Leahy kept in Harvard, Illinois. He reportedly told his sister that he was going to use the poison to coat razor blades and mail them to his enemies in hopes that they would cut themselves and be exposed. Leahy pleaded guilty to possession of the ricin and was sentenced to eight years for the shooting and six-and-one-half years for possessing dangerous materials.

=== April 1997, James Dalton Bell ===
The US Internal Revenue Service (IRS) investigators searched the home of James Dalton Bell, a 39-year-old electronics engineer, and discovered a cache of chemicals, which included sodium cyanide (500 grams), diisopropyl fluorophosphate, and a range of corrosive acids. Subsequent analysis of computer files confiscated from the residence revealed that Bell engaged in e-mail communications with a friend, Robert East, a 46-year-old merchant marine radio operator, that expressed a desire to obtain castor beans to see if they could extract ricin. Bell had already acquired the home addresses of nearly 100 federal employees from the Federal Bureau of Investigation (FBI), IRS, and Bureau of Alcohol, Tobacco and Firearms, and computer files from voter registration. Bell was in the process of producing and acquiring chemical and biological agents.

=== March 1998, Michigan, US ===
Three members of a splinter group of the North American Militia in Michigan were arrested on weapons and conspiracy charges. The April 1998 indictment was the result of an investigation involving an Alcohol, Tobacco, and Firearms (ATF) agent who infiltrated the group in March 1997. When federal law enforcement raided the homes of these men, they discovered an arsenal of weapons and a videotape. Produced in a cooking-show format, the tape gave instructions on how to manufacture bombs and other assorted militia-type weaponry, including a feature segment on how to extract ricin from castor beans. During the court proceedings, prosecutors drew attention to the ricin segment, stating that the men were "collecting information on the manufacture and use of ricin." However, other than the videotape, no materials associated with ricin production were found in any of the raids.

=== November 1999, Tampa, Florida, US ===
Press reports indicated that FBI agents had apprehended a man in Tampa, Florida, for threatening to kill court officials and "wage biological warfare" in Jefferson County, Colorado. James Kenneth Gluck, 53, a former Colorado resident, sent a 10-page letter to Jefferson County judges threatening to kill them with a biological agent. He specifically identified one judge by name. FBI agents arrested Gluck on 5 November 1999 as he left a public library near his home in Tampa. Police, fire, and hazardous materials (HazMat) crews responded to the scene along with the FBI and blocked off Gluck's street. Upon searching his residence the next day, agents discovered that Gluck had the necessary ingredients to make ricin, though no refined ricin was actually found. They also found test tubes and beakers, as well as a copy of The Anarchist Cookbook and books on biological toxicology, in a makeshift laboratory in his home.

== 2000s ==
=== August 2001, Russia and Chechnya ===
The Russian Federal Security Service told the Itar-Tass news service it had intercepted a recorded conversation between two Chechen field commanders in which they discussed using homemade poisons against Russian troops. According to Itar-Tass, Chechen Brigadier General Rizvan Chitigov asked Chechen field commander Hizir Alhazurov, who is now living in the United Arab Emirates, for instructions on the "homemade production of poison" for use against Russian soldiers. Russian authorities reportedly raided Chitigov's home and seized materials, including instructions on how to use toxic agents to contaminate consumer goods, a small chemical laboratory, three homemade explosives, two land mines, and 30 grenades. The confiscated papers reportedly also contained instructions on how to produce ricin from castor beans.

=== June 2002, Spokane Valley, Washington, US ===
Kenneth R. Olsen, 48, was arrested for possession of the biological agent ricin in his Spokane Valley office cubicle. Co-workers at Agilent, a high-tech company, tipped FBI officials about the software engineer after discovering documents on "how to kill", undetectable poisons, and bomb-making Olsen had printed out from his computer. Olsen insisted that his research was for a Boy Scout project, but did not say more. Further investigation of his office produced test tubes, castor beans, glass jars, and approximately 1 gram of ricin. In July 2003 Olsen was convicted of possessing a chemical weapon and possessing a biological weapon. He was sentenced to 165 months, almost 14 years in prison.

=== August 2002, Ansar al-Islam ===
Reports emerged that Ansar al-Islam, a Sunni militant group, was involved in testing poisons and chemicals including ricin. According to one report the group tested ricin powder as an aerosol on animals such as donkeys and chickens and perhaps even an unwitting human subject. No more specific details were released.

=== January 2003 arrests in the UK ===
On 5 January 2003 the Metropolitan Police raided a flat in north London and arrested six Algerian men who they claimed were manufacturing ricin as part of a plot for a poison attack on the London Underground. No ricin was recovered as a result of this raid. Only one person was convicted (of conspiracy to cause a public nuisance by the use of poisons and/or explosives to cause disruption, fear or injury) and jailed for 17 years. He had previously received a life sentence for stabbing and killing a policeman during the raid.

The U.S. Secretary of State Colin Powell used this incident in his 5th February 2003 speech to the UN as part of the case for the 2003 Invasion of Iraq, as the "UK poison cell" part of the alleged Abu Musab al-Zarqawi global terrorist network.

=== 2003 letters in the US ===
In 2003, a package and letter sealed in a "ricin-contaminated" envelope was intercepted in Greenville, South Carolina, at a United States Postal Service processing center.

Ricin was detected in the mail at the White House in Washington, D.C., in November 2003. The letter containing it was intercepted at a mail handling facility off the grounds of the White House, and it never reached its intended destination. The letter contained a fine powdery substance that later tested positive for ricin. Investigators said it was low potency and was not considered a health risk. This information was not made public for nearly three months, when preliminary tests showed the presence of ricin in an office mailroom of U.S. Senate Majority Leader Bill Frist's office. There were no signs that anyone who was near the contaminated area developed any medical problems. Several Senate office buildings were closed as a precaution.

=== April 2004, Kirkland, Washington, U.S. ===
In April 2004, Kirkland, Washington resident Robert M. Alberg was arrested by FBI for possession of ricin. Alberg, son of businessman Tom Alberg, has Asperger’s syndrome and was diagnosed with clinical depression: federal prosecutors stated that they did not believe that he had political motivations for making the poison and had no plans to use it. In June 2005, Alberg was arrested for violating the conditions of his parole by possessing castor bean seeds; he was sentenced to three years in a federal prison.

=== January 2006, Richmond, Virginia, US ===
In January 2006, ricin was found in a home in suburban Richmond, Virginia, in the form of mashed castor beans. The suspect, Chetanand Sewraz, was allegedly isolating the toxin to kill his estranged wife.

=== February 2008, Las Vegas, Nevada, US ===
In February 2008, a man who stayed in a Las Vegas motel room where ricin was found was taken to the hospital in critical condition. The man, Roger Von Bergendorff, was hospitalized on February 14; however, the ricin was not found until February 27 when a relative retrieved his luggage because the motel had not been paid for two weeks. Firearms and an "anarchist type textbook" were found in the same motel room where several vials of ricin were found, police reported. According to Las Vegas 8 Television news, police noted the ricin section of the textbook was highlighted. On March 3, FBI agents searched a Riverton, Utah house and several storage lockers in West Jordan, Utah linked to Bergendorff, but did not find any traces of ricin. Bergendorff awoke from a coma on March 14. He was questioned by police as to why he had such a large quantity of ricin. Subsequently, he was arrested on April 16 and charged with possession of a biological toxin and two weapons offenses.

=== January 2009, Seattle, Washington, US ===
The managers of eleven gay bars in the Capitol Hill region of Seattle received letters from an anonymous sender claiming to be in possession of 67 grams of ricin that would be used to dose exactly five patrons from each establishment with the intent of killing them.

Speculations that the terrorist was possibly a homosexual himself abound, particularly as the letter directly quotes a poem by gay author Mark Doty in a recently published anthology.

=== June 2009, County Durham, England ===
During the raid on the homes of a man and son in June 2009, a very small amount of ricin was allegedly found in a sealed jam jar kept in a kitchen cupboard. A father and son, Ian and Nicky Davison were arrested under the 2000 Terrorism Act. The arrests followed a long-running intelligence-led operation against extreme right-wing activity. Ian Davison was sentenced to ten years in May 2010, for preparing acts of terrorism, three counts of possessing material useful to commit acts of terrorism and possessing a prohibited weapon; his son was given two years youth detention for possessing material useful to commit acts of terrorism.

=== June 2009, Everett, Washington, US ===
On June 4, 2009, local ABC affiliate KOMO 4 News reported that authorities had isolated a suburban home in Everett, WA and part of the surrounding neighborhood after the suspected discovery of ricin in the home. The suspected discovery of ricin occurred after the residents, a husband and wife, returned from the hospital following a domestic disturbance report.

== 2010s ==
=== January 2011, Akron, Ohio, US ===
In January 2011, FBI agents discovered what was thought to be ricin in a Coventry Township, Ohio, home, and later reported that tests confirmed its presence. Jeff Levenderis was sentenced to six years in prison for manufacture of the ricin in 2014.

=== November 2011, Gainesville, Georgia, US ===
In 2011, the FBI arrested four men in the U.S. state of Georgia, who were allegedly plotting to deploy explosives and biological weapons to kill a number of American politicians, media figures, Internal Revenue Service employees, and innocent civilians. The four men were Frederick Thomas, 73, Dan Roberts, 67; Ray H Adams, 65; and Samuel J. Crump, 68. Thomas is from Cleveland, Georgia; the other three men are from Toccoa. They were members of a domestic militia group and believed they had to commit murder in order to "save this country". According to The Guardian, Crump had planned to make 10 pounds of ricin and spread it in major cities and along Atlanta, Jacksonville, Newark, Washington, D.C., and New Orleans highways and bomb federal buildings in Atlanta. They also discussed dispersing ricin from an airplane in the sky over Washington, D.C., and possibly attack other targets with explosives. Adams is a former Agricultural Research Service employee, while Crump used to work at the Centers for Disease Control and Prevention.

According to court documents, Thomas was inspired by the online pro-militia novel "Absolved" by Mike Vanderboegh, which features small bands of U. S. citizens rising up against the federal government. Vanderboegh denied responsibility for inspiring the attack, saying in a blog post "I am as much to blame for the Georgia Geriatric Terrorist Gang as Tom Clancy is for Nine Eleven." Earlier, Vanderboegh had attracted controversy after urging health care reform opponents to throw bricks through the windows of Democratic Party offices; several such incidents occurred after Vanderboegh made his statement.

On August 22, 2012, Thomas and Roberts were sentenced to five years in federal prison.

=== April 2013, Washington, DC, US ===
On April 16, 2013, an envelope that tested positive for ricin was intercepted at the US Capitol's off-site mail facility in Washington, D.C. According to reports, the envelope was addressed to the office of Senator Roger Wicker, R-Mississippi.

The next day, an envelope addressed to President Obama was tested positive for ricin. A third letter sent to a Mississippi judge also tested positive for ricin.

Both letters included the phrases "to see a wrong and not expose it, is to become a silent partner to its continuance." and "I am KC and I approve this message."

=== May 2013, Shannon Richardson incident ===
In May 2013, while going through a divorce, US actress Shannon Richardson called the police and accused her husband of mailing ricin to several politicians.

Nathan Richardson has not been charged with any crime. He told investigators that his wife set him up. Investigators found that Shannon Richardson indeed mailed the ricin herself, in an effort to set up her estranged husband.

Shannon Richardson was arrested on June 7, 2013, for alleged connections with ricin laced letters sent to politicians including President Barack Obama and New York City mayor Michael Bloomberg. She was charged with ″mailing a threatening letter to President Barack Obama″. On June 6, she confessed that she had mailed the three letters, knowing they contained ricin, but claimed her husband made her do it. On December 10, she pleaded guilty to sending the letters. The plea limits her potential sentence to 18 years.

=== October 2, 2013, Logan, Utah, US ===
A 37-year-old female ingested the pulp of 30 castor beans to commit suicide from ricin poisoning. Trace amounts of the toxin were later found in her residence. She was found by her husband and immediately put in intensive care for a week but did not survive.

=== March 2014, Hatboro, Pennsylvania, US ===
On March 21, 2014, 19-year-old Nicholas Todd Helman was arrested for sending a scratch-and-sniff birthday card laced with ricin to a man dating his ex-girlfriend. Helman was charged with attempted murder and risking catastrophe after lab tests showed that the card he placed in the man's family mailbox on March 6 contained traces of the toxic substance. Helman bragged of the toxic card to a coworker at Target in Warrington later that day. The coworker then notified authorities, and the police called the man's home and spoke to his mother, asking whether she had retrieved the mail that day. When Helman was first questioned about the incident on March 7, he told police that he had only coated the card with sodium hydroxide, which he chose because it resembled the toxin anthrax. Helman also admitted to sending threatening messages to the man via Facebook, and police seized from him what appeared to be sodium hydroxide and a notebook with a ricin recipe. Helman was charged on March 7 with terroristic threats and harassment. In the meantime, authorities sent the card away for subsequent lab tests. The results confirmed that the card indeed had traces of ricin, prompting the Warminster Police Department to arrest Helman at his Hatboro apartment, assisted by numerous agencies including the Hatboro police, a hazmat team, a SWAT team, police officers and officials with the FBI. After a standoff that lasted several hours, Helman was led out of his apartment and into a police vehicle by officers clad in armor and hazmat gear.

=== July 2015, Liverpool incident ===
On July 29, 2015, 31-year-old Mohammed Ali from Liverpool, England was convicted at the Old Bailey of attempting to possess a chemical weapon. In January 2015, Ali had attempted to buy 500 mg of ricin on the dark web, but he had been in contact with an FBI agent and was sent a harmless powder. Ali said that he had been influenced by the television series Breaking Bad. On September 18, 2015, Ali was sentenced to eight years in prison.

=== February 2017, Fannin County, Georgia, US ===
On February 2, 2017, 27-year-old William Christopher Gibbs drove himself to a hospital emergency room in Fannin County, Georgia, US, saying that he had been exposed to ricin. His car was found to be positive for ricin on test. In response the Army National Guard and the local fire department were called out to his home town of Morganton, and the area was swept by personnel in hazmat suits. The FBI subsequently stated that "no evidence that any poisonous or toxic substances have been dispersed or that the public is at risk", but that they would continue to investigate. Gibbs was arrested, but ultimately released without charges due to a loophole in federal law that exposed a regulatory failure. Multiple sources indicated that Gibbs was connected to the white supremacist group, Creativity Alliance.

=== October 2018, Republican/Washington D.C. incident ===
On October 2, 2018, ricin particles were detected in mail sent to The Pentagon. This mail was addressed to Secretary of Defense Jim Mattis, Chief of Naval Operations John M. Richardson, President Donald Trump, and Senator of Texas Ted Cruz.

=== 2018 Cologne terrorist plot ===
On 13 June 2018, police raided an apartment in central Cologne, Germany and found a large amount of castor beans and ricin powder and paste. Detectives from the German Public Prosecutor General and Federal Criminal Police Office conducted the investigation. By July 2018, investigators had found three mobile phones among the possessions of the suspect, in one of which many chat logs along with various instructions on how to make a bomb were found. The suspect had also acquired the means to transform castor beans into poison.

== 2020s ==
=== September 2020, Washington, DC, US ===
A package containing ricin which was addressed to President Donald Trump was intercepted by law enforcement. A Canadian woman suspected of sending it was arrested when she tried to cross the Canadian-US border.

=== June 2023, Oslo, Norway ===
On June 9, a teenager in Oslo, Norway, called for an ambulance for himself, after having been exposed to ricin. He later confessed to have attempted to produce ricin at home, which led to him being detained at the hospital. Tests of the substance confirmed he had succeeded in producing ricin. The incident is ongoing, and the teenager has pled not guilty in the case, as he claims he did not intend to use the ricin to hurt anyone else.

=== July 2024, Southport, United Kingdom ===
Axel Rudakubana, perpetrator of the 2024 Southport Stabbings, was found to have produced ricin.

In a sealed container hidden away in his bedroom, police found he had attempted to make the deadly poison ricin. It is not known how much of the toxin he managed to make.
