= Kircho Kirov =

General Kircho Kirov was the head of the National Intelligence Service of Bulgaria from February 2003 to January 2012.

== Career ==
Kirov was appointed as head of the NIS in February 2003 (initially in an acting capacity) by President Georgi Purvanov. He briefly served as an advisor to Prime Minister Boiko Borissov, but was fired after two months.

== Trials ==
In August 2015, Kirov was sentenced to 10 years in prison for misappropriation of public funds and violations of financial discipline.

In January 2018, after a second trial, Kirov was sentenced to 15 years in prison after being convicted of embezzling 5.1 million lev. He was convicted of ordering a subordinate to embezzle funds from the NIS budget.

Kirov denied the allegations, claiming the prosecution was politically motivated.
