= Txalaparta (publisher) =

Basque publishing house

Txalaparta is a free and independent Basque publishing house based in Tafalla, Navarra. Founded in 1988 by José María Esparza Zabalegui, it has 1000 published titles to its credit.

They publish about 40 books a year, mainly in Basque and Spanish. Their book collections include Basque and world literature, political and historical essays, works of social criticism, classic works in left-wing politics, as well as history encyclopedias.

Under the name "Editores Independientes" (Independent Publishers), they collaborate with other publishers such as ERA in Mexico, LOM in Chile or Trilce in Uruguay.
