= MICT =

MICT may refer to:

- Mail Isolation Control and Tracking, a surveillance program of the United States Postal Service
- Mechanism for International Criminal Tribunals, a United Nations Security Council agency that functions as oversight program of, and successor entity to, the International Criminal Tribunal for Rwanda and International Criminal Tribunal for the former Yugoslavia

in Ministries of Information and Communication(s) Technology:

- Ministry of Information and Communications Technology (Colombia)
- Ministry of Information and Communications Technology (Iran)
- Ministry of Information and Communication Technology (Thailand)
- Ministry of Information and Communications Technology (Zimbabwe)
