= Bulgarian umbrella =

Weapon used in assassination attempts

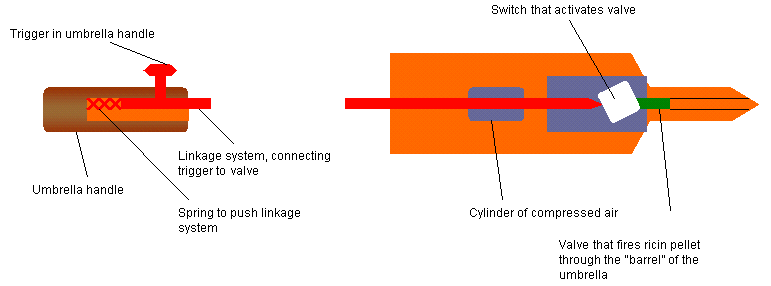
Speculative diagram of the device.

A Bulgarian umbrella is an umbrella with a hidden pneumatic mechanism which fires a small metal pellet containing ricin into the victim from extremely close range.

== Recorded usage ==
Such an umbrella was used in and named for the assassination of the Bulgarian dissident writer Georgi Markov on 7 September 1978 (the birthday of the Bulgarian State Council chairman Todor Zhivkov, who had often been the target of Georgi Markov's criticism) on Waterloo Bridge in London. Markov died four days later.

It was also allegedly used in the failed assassination attempt against the Bulgarian dissident journalist Vladimir Kostov the same year in the Paris Métro. The poison used in both cases was ricin. Both assassination attempts are believed to have been organized by the Bulgarian Secret Service of the time of the Cold War with the assistance of the KGB.

Such an umbrella was intended to be used to assassinate Pallo Jordan and Ronnie Kasrils by the apartheid-era South African Civil Cooperation Bureau death squad.

== Cultural influence ==
These two cases inspired:

- The episode "Hot Ice" of Quincy, M.E. (1979)
- The Markov case was referenced directly, and a similar assassination method used, in the 1979 novel The Green Ripper by John D. MacDonald.
- The French film Le Coup du parapluie (The Umbrella Coup) directed by Gérard Oury and starring Pierre Richard (1980)
- The episode "At All Costs" of The Sandbaggers (1980)
- Two episodes of the British political comedy series Yes Minister / Yes, Prime Minister, where in "The Death List" (1981) the titular Minister Jim Hacker is told of various risks by methods of assassination, and in "A Diplomatic Incident" (1987) a Bulgarian umbrella is suggested as a way to kill a French puppy that was intended as gift to the Queen, to prevent a diplomatic incident caused by quarantine regulations
- Bulgarian writer Stefan Kisyov's novel The Executioner (2003)
- The episode "Seven Thirty-Seven" of the American crime drama Breaking Bad (2009), which features a plan by protagonists Walter White and Jesse Pinkman to kill a drug lord with ricin. During the introduction of the substance, White highlights the assassination of Markov as a successful case of ricin poisoning.
- The episode "I, Murdoch" of Murdoch Mysteries (2009)
- The episode "Obsession" of NCIS (2010)
- The episode "Marionette" of Fringe (2010)
- The 96th episode "A x Lawless x Home" of Hunter x Hunter (2011) features a character Feitan whose umbrella could shoot a projectile.
- The episode "The Clock" of The Americans (2013)
- The video games Splatoon 2 (2017) and Splatoon 3 (2022) feature Brellas, a weapon class consisting of umbrellas that can shoot shotgun-like blasts of ink.
- The Hindi-language film Raazi (2018)
- The 2022 Steven Soderbergh thriller Kimi features a public injection of an unknown sedative using the tip of an umbrella.

== See also ==
- Francesco Gullino, alleged Bulgarian umbrella murderer
- MythBusters "Exploding Toilet" – the feasibility of this type of assassination was confirmed in the first episode of MythBusters.
