= Mail Isolation Control and Tracking =

Surveillance program of the United States Postal Service

Mail Isolation Control and Tracking (MICT) is an imaging system employed by the United States Postal Service (USPS) that takes photographs of the exterior of every piece of mail that is processed in the United States. The Postmaster General has stated that the system is primarily used for mail sorting, though it also enables the USPS to retroactively track mail correspondence at the request of law enforcement. It was created in the aftermath of the 2001 anthrax attacks that killed five people, including two postal workers. The automated mail tracking program was created so that the Postal Service could more easily track hazardous substances and keep people safe, according to U.S. Postmaster General Patrick R. Donahoe.

The Federal Bureau of Investigation (FBI) revealed MICT on June 7, 2013, when discussing the Bureau's investigation of ricin-laced letters sent to U.S. President Barack Obama and New York City mayor Michael Bloomberg. The FBI stated in a criminal complaint that the program was used to narrow its investigation to Shannon Richardson. The Postmaster General, Patrick R. Donahoe, confirmed in an interview with the Associated Press the existence of this program on August 2, 2013.

In confirming the existence of MICT, Donahoe told the Associated Press that the USPS does not maintain a massive centralized database of the letter images. He said that the images are taken at more than 200 mail processing centers around the country, and that each scanning machine at the processing centers only keeps images of the letters it scans. He also stated the images are retained for a week to 30 days and then destroyed.

Computer security and information privacy expert Bruce Schneier compared MICT to the mass surveillance of the National Security Agency (NSA), revealed in June 2013 by Edward Snowden. Schneier said, "Basically, [the USPS is] doing the same thing as the [NSA] programs, collecting the information on the outside of your mail, the metadata, if you will, of names, addresses, return addresses and postmark locations, which gives the government a pretty good map of your contacts, even if they aren't reading the contents."

James J. Wedick, a former FBI agent, said of MICT, "It's a treasure trove of information. Looking at just the outside of letters and other mail, I can see who you bank with, who you communicate with—all kinds of useful information that gives investigators leads that they can then follow up on with a subpoena." He also said the program "can be easily abused because it's so easy to use, and you don't have to go through a judge to get the information. You just fill out a form."

The U.S. Postal Service almost never denies requests to track suspects’ mail on behalf of law-enforcement agencies.

== See also ==
- Informed Delivery
- Mail cover
- Mass surveillance in the United States
- Multiline optical-character reader
- Postal censorship
