= Informed Delivery =

Product of the United States Postal Service

Informed Delivery is a feature offered by the United States Postal Service (USPS) whereby consumers can digitally preview incoming mail and manage packages scheduled to arrive soon.

Consumers that sign up for Informed Delivery can digitally preview their mail and manage packages scheduled to arrive soon via email notification, online dashboard, or mobile app. Users also have the ability to interact with digital content provided by business mailers (e.g., special offers, related links) directly from Informed Delivery.

Exterior images are only provided for letter-size mailpieces that are processed through USPS automated equipment. Some mailpieces (e.g., catalogues, magazines, larger envelopes) are not imaged by USPS automated equipment and do not appear in Informed Delivery notifications. Users can also receive USPS Tracking updates for incoming packages, provide delivery instructions, manage notifications, and schedule redelivery directly from Informed Delivery. The feature also allows consumers to indicate if specific items in the Informed Delivery notifications are not received.

== Availability ==
Informed Delivery was first made available as a pilot project in a few ZIP Codes in 2014, and in 2017 was expanded to the majority of ZIP Codes across the United States. As of January 2019, there were 14.9 million users.

== Reception ==
According to an April 2018 user survey (8,631 respondents in 5,784 ZIP Codes), 89% of respondents are satisfied or very satisfied with the feature. 93% would recommend Informed Delivery to friends, family, or colleagues.

== Security and privacy ==
Some consumers have expressed concern that Informed Delivery could be misused by stalkers, abusive ex-partners, private investigators, and identity thieves.

The Postal Service takes measures to ensure the security and privacy of consumers’ mail. Because Informed Delivery offers increased visibility into both mail and packages being delivered to an individual’s address, USPS verifies identities of individuals, including the use of a mail-based verification letter.

- Mail Scanning: The scanned mail images are of the external markings, showing only the exterior, address side of letter-sized mailpieces. Package notifications do not include images, only information on the delivery status of the package.
- U.S. Postal Inspection Service (USPIS): Mail is protected by the USPIS, whose purpose is to safeguard the U.S. Postal Service system, including the employees who deliver and process the mail and millions of customers who use it.
- Privacy Act: The Postal Service adheres to the privacy requirements of the Privacy Act established by the federal government which controls when and how the USPS shares personal information and limits the conditions in which that information can be disclosed externally to outside parties.

According to Krebs on Security, Informed Delivery uses a form of authentication known as knowledge-based authentication (KBA) to verify that people signing up truly live at that address. KBA authenticates users by asking them a series of multiple choice questions that, presumably, only the user would know the answer to. However, Krebs has criticized KBA because in his view many of the questions can be answered easily by an attacker. Informed Delivery executive program director Bob Dixon had indicated that security would be improved by January 2018 by sending a letter confirmation when someone signs up. Mail-based verification letters were implemented by USPS in January 2018, and are sent after sign-up to the account address to give the residents the opportunity to remove the Informed Delivery account if desired.

== See also ==
- Mail Isolation Control and Tracking
