= Vick Foundation =

Logo

The Vick Foundation was established in February 2004 to award an annual prize for best Bulgarian novel. There is also a competition for the most popular short-listed book, based on votes cast by the general public. In 2008, the award will celebrate its 5th anniversary, and the foundation is on the path to becoming an institution in Bulgaria.

== History ==
Vick's initiative was acclaimed by those who saw in the prize a new opportunity for the Bulgarian literature after almost 15 years of standstill.

A permanent committee, which includes Stefan Danailov, the current Minister of Culture of Bulgaria, elects а jury. Other members in the committee are Raymond Wagenstein, Boyan Biolchev, Nedyalko Yordanov, Hristo Droumev and Ivan Granitski. The jury changes each year and they select a short list of six Bulgarian novels from which the winner is chosen. One of the member making up the 2008 jury is Meglena Kuneva, the current European commissioner in Bulgaria.

The aim of the foundation is also to enable others to gain access into Bulgarian literature, especially for the literary world beyond Bulgaria.

The award ceremony each year is well attended by members of Bulgarian society and journalist, as can be seen by the photo gallery on the website^{[usurped]}. The event is covered by TV channels in Bulgaria and causes quite a media furor annually. KariZa and other well-known performers have graced the stages during the award ceremony and the ceremonies are known to be of much entertainment value.

The competition is organised with the support of EVS Translations

== Vick Prize winners ==
- 2004: Ekzekoutorat^{[usurped]} (The Executioner (Kisyov novel)) by Stefan Kisyov
- 2005: Staklenata reka (The Glass River) by Emil Andreev
- 2006: Amazonkata na Varoe (Varoe's Amazon) by Prof. Boyan Biolchev
- 2007: Partien Dom (Party Headquarters) by Georgi Tenev
- 2008: Photo Stoyanovich by Evgenia Ivanova
