= Mail cover =

US law enforcement technique

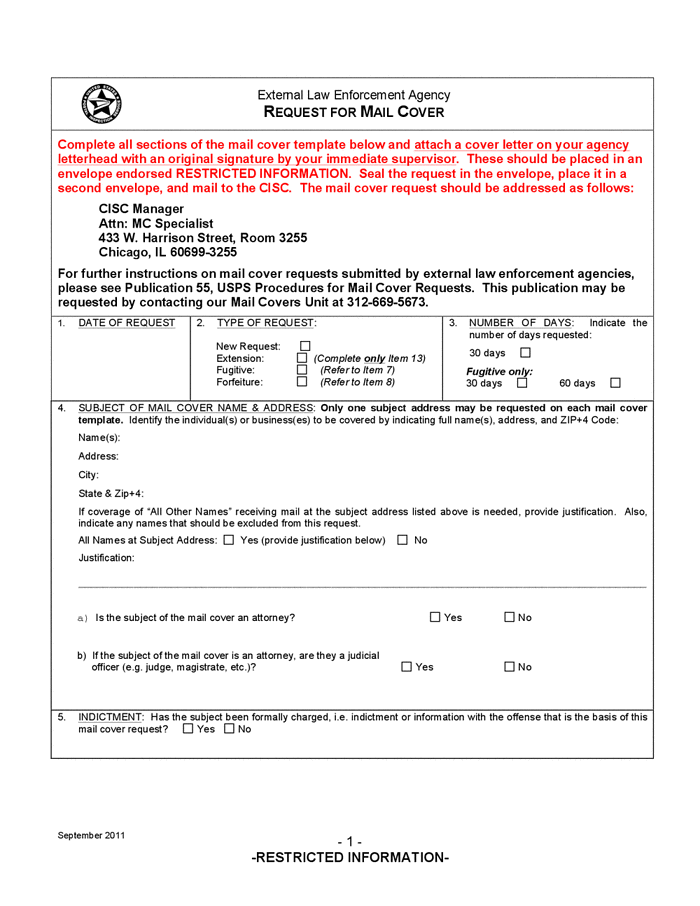
Request for mail cover form

Mail cover is a law enforcement investigative technique in which the United States Postal Service, acting at the request of a law enforcement agency, records information from the outside of letters and parcels before they are delivered and then sends the information to the agency that requested it. The Postal Service grants mail cover surveillance requests for about 30 days and may extend them for up to 120 days.

Mail covers can be requested to investigate criminal activity or to protect national security. On average the Postal Service grants 15,000 to 20,000 criminal activity requests each year. It rarely denies a request.

Mail cover is defined by the U.S. Postal Regulations 39 CFR 233.3 and the Internal Revenue Manual as follows:

Mail cover is the process by which a nonconsensual record is made of any data appearing on the outside cover of sealed or unsealed mail; or by which a record is made of the contents of any unsealed mail, as allowed by law, to obtain information to protect national security; locate a fugitive; obtain evidence of the commission or attempted commission of a crime; obtain evidence of a violation or attempted violation of a postal statute; or assist in the identification of property, proceeds, or assets forfeitable under law.

As mail cover does not involve the reading of the mail but only information on the outside of the envelope or package that could be read by anyone seeing the item anyway, it is not considered by court precedent a violation of the Fourth Amendment. However, there has been criticism of the practice by some, particularly due to the delay in mail the process might cause, though regulations prohibit mail cover from delaying mail.

According to official statistics obtained through a FOIA request by the National Law Journal, the number of mail covers in 1984 was 9,022 and increased to 14,077 in 2000. Since 2001, the Postal Service has been effectively conducting mail covers on all American postal mail as part of the Mail Isolation Control and Tracking program.

== See also ==
- Church Committee § Opening mail
- Mail Isolation Control and Tracking
- Mass surveillance in the United States
