= Stefan Kisyov =

Bulgarian novelist, journalist, playwright and short story writer

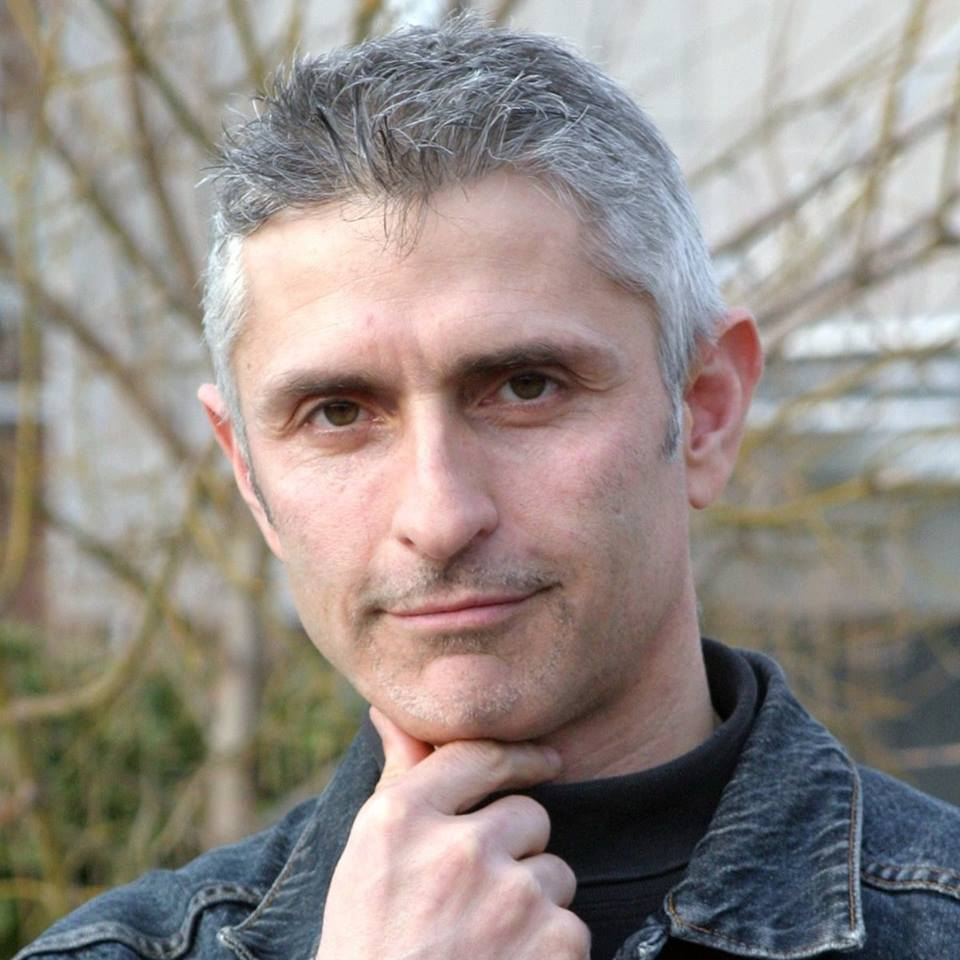
Stefan Kisyov

Stefan Kisyov is a Bulgarian novelist, journalist, playwright and short story writer. Kisyov was born in Stara Zagora in 1963. He studied at Sofia and Plovdiv universities, and also at the Sorbonne in Paris. He has worked as an electrician at a tram depot, locksmith at a chemical factory, administrator at a Black Sea hotel, stage hand at the Stara Zagora Opera, waiter, newspaper journalist and in television. He lived in France and Switzerland. He is the author of books such as Jukebox, Not a Thing Anywhere, Don't Wake the Somnambulist, Your Name is Woman and A Waiter in the Boyana Residence. His award-winning novel, The Executioner was published in 2003.

Stefan Kisyov lives in Havana.

== Works ==
=== Stefan Kisyov's novels ===
- Juke-box (1996)
- Nothing Anywhere (2000)
- Don't Wake Up the Sleepwalker (2000)
- The Executioner, winner of the Vick Foundation's "Best Novel of 2004" Era (publisher)
- A Waiter at Boyana Residence (2004)
- Thy name is a woman (2007) Era (publisher)
- The Voyeur and the Tenant (2008) Era (publisher)
- The Mystery of the Knight Capulet (2011) Era (publisher)

=== Short stories ===
Kisyov has written over 100 short stories in influential newspapers and magazines and many non-fictional pieces.

=== Play ===
- Desperadoes (1999)
