= Committee for State Security (Bulgaria) =

Bulgarian secret service under the People's Republic of Bulgaria during the Cold War

- Държавна сигурност (Durzhavna Sigurnost)
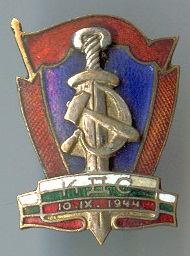
- Honor badge of the CSS with the first logo of the agency (1963–1965)

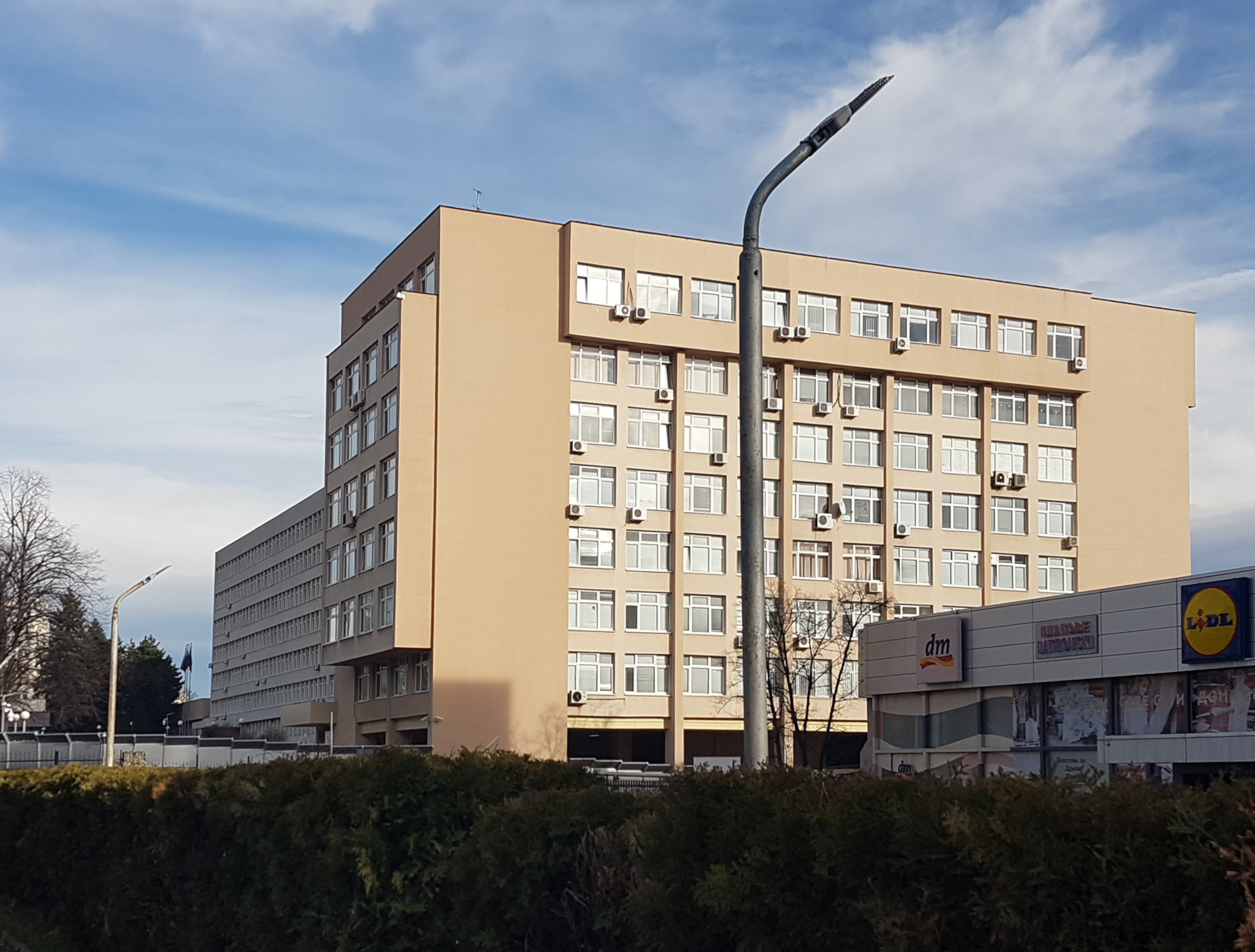
- The State Security building on Cherni Vrah Boulevard in Sofia

Agency overview
- Formed: 1925
- Dissolved: 1990
- Superseding agencies: DANS; SIA
- Headquarters: Sofia

State Security (Държавна сигурност, Darzhavna sigurnost; abbreviated ДС, DS) was the name of the Bulgarian secret service under the People's Republic of Bulgaria during the Cold War, until 1989. State Security was closely allied with its Soviet counterpart, the KGB.

== Structure ==
- 1st Main Directorate – foreign intelligence. Succeeded by the National Intelligence Service in 1990.
- 2nd Main Directorate – counterintelligence. Succeeded by the National Security Service.
- 3rd Directorate – military counterintelligence
- 4th Directorate – surveillance
- 5th Directorate – government security and protection. Succeeded by the National Protection Service.
- 6th Directorate – political police. Succeeded by the Main Service for Combating Organized Crime. It had the following departments:
  - 1st Department – worked among the intelligentsia and controlling the unions of artists
  - 2nd Department – worked in the universities and among the students
  - 3rd Department – responsible for the clergy, Jews, Armenians, and White Russian emigrants
  - 4th Department – specialized in pro-Turkish and pro-Macedonian nationalism
  - 5th Department – worked among the political rivals, such as the agrarians and social democrats
  - 6th Department – observed pro-Maoist and anti-party activity
  - 7th Department – information analysis and anonymous activity
- 7th Directorate – information work

== Activity ==
In 1964, the State Security formed Service 7, led by Colonel Petko Kovachev, dedicated to murder, kidnapping, and disinformation against Bulgarian dissidents living abroad. The unit executed actions against dissidents in Italy, Britain, Denmark, West Germany, Turkey, France, Ethiopia, Sweden, and Switzerland. Documents describing its activities were declassified in 2010.

State Security played an active part in the so-called "Revival Process" to Bulgarianize the Bulgarian Turks in the 1980s, as well as writer and dissident Georgi Markov's 1978 murder on Waterloo Bridge in London known for the "Bulgarian umbrella" that was used.

An issue the international community often raises is State Security's alleged control of the weapons, drugs, alcohol, cigarettes, gold, silver, and antiques trafficked through Bulgaria before 1989. It is popularly thought that organised crime in the country in the 1990s was set up by former State Security agents.

The agency is often incriminated with the ill-famed murder of dissident writer Georgi Markov and was formerly accused of the 1981 attempt on Pope John Paul II's life. Bulgaria has always sharply criticized and denied the latter allegation. In a 2002 visit, the Pontiff cleared Bulgaria of any involvement.

== Legacy ==
The secret files of the DS have been a source of great controversy in the country. After the communist regime in the country collapsed, newly established democratic forces accused the former communist elite of secretly removing DS files that could compromise its members. In 2002, former Interior Minister Gen. Atanas Semerdzhiev was found guilty of razing 144,235 files from the DS archives. Others have accused the DS of infiltrating the young opposition.

On 5 April 2007 Bulgarian parliament appointed a special Committee for disclosing the documents and announcing affiliation of Bulgarian citizens to the State Security and the intelligence services of the Bulgarian National Army (or ComDos). It began checking persons who once held or still hold public positions to establish any affiliation. Regular reports are delivered to the parliament and all disclosures are made public on the Committee website and in special publications.

== See also ==
- The Executioner (Kisyov novel)
- Bulgarian umbrella
- Eastern Bloc politics
