= Francesco Gullino =

Murder suspect (1945–2021)

Francesco Gullino (or Giullino) (31 May 1945 – 15 August 2021) was a Dane of Italian origin, who was a smuggler, secret agent, and suspected assassin. In June 2005, he was named by The Times as the prime suspect in the 1978 "Bulgarian umbrella" murder of Bulgarian dissident Georgi Markov. He was born in Bra, Piedmont, Italy and was known by the code name "Piccadilly".

According to Bulgarian journalist Hristo Hristov, Gullino was an occasional smuggler arrested twice in Bulgaria and given the choice of going to prison or becoming a secret agent in the West. Based in Copenhagen with a cover as an art dealer, Gullino was supposedly active until 1990 and received two Bulgarian state medals “for services to security and public order”. He was briefly detained in 1993 and questioned by the British and Danish police in Copenhagen and, according to Hristov, then dropped out of sight. Although Gullino admitted to having been in London when Markov was murdered, he always denied having been involved in any way.

A 2006 British documentary, The Umbrella Assassin, interviewed people connected with the case in Bulgaria, Britain and the United States, and revealed that Gullino was alive and well.

In March 2023, the Danish Broadcasting Corporation (DR) published a three-part documentary series about the life of Gullino and his espionage activities. The series brought special attention to an interrogation of Gullino by Scotland Yard detectives Christopher Bird and David Kemp that took place in 1993. In the interrogation Gullino admits to a relationship with the Bulgarian State. The team behind the series found and interviewed Gullino in June 2021. In the interview Gullino denies all the allegations put forth against him.

Shortly after Gullino conducted the interview, he was found dead from an unconfirmed cause in his apartment in Wels in Upper Austria in August 2021.
