= Georgi Markov =

Bulgarian-British dissident writer (1929–1978)

- Георги Иванов Марков
- Born: 1 March 1929; Sofia, Bulgaria
- Died: 11 September 1978 (aged 49); Balham, London, England
- Cause of death: Ricin poisoning
- Resting place: Church of St Candida and Holy Cross
- Occupations: Writer, broadcaster, playwright, anti-communist dissident
- Writing career
- Language: Bulgarian
- Notable work: The Truth that Killed

Georgi Ivanov Markov (Bulgarian: Георги Иванов Марков [ɟɛˈɔrɟi ˈmarkov]; 1 March 1929 – 11 September 1978) was a Bulgarian dissident writer. He worked as a novelist, screenwriter and playwright in his native country, the People's Republic of Bulgaria, until his defection in 1969. After relocating to London, he worked as a broadcaster and journalist for the BBC World Service, the Radio Free Europe and West Germany's Deutsche Welle. Markov used such forums to conduct a campaign of sarcastic criticism against the incumbent Bulgarian-Soviet regime.

Markov was assassinated by being injected with a tiny pellet containing poison, possibly ricin, which was covertly delivered into his leg on a London street by an unknown man who used an umbrella as a weapon. Markov died four days later. Contemporary newspaper accounts indicated the assassin was believed to be associated with the Bulgarian Secret Service. Annabel Markov recalled her husband's view about the umbrella, telling the BBC's Panorama programme, in April 1979, "He felt a jab in his thigh. He looked around and there was a man behind him who'd apologized and dropped an umbrella. I got the impression as he told the story that the jab hadn't been inflicted by the umbrella but that the man had dropped the umbrella as cover to hide his face." It was reported after the fall of the Soviet Union that the Soviet KGB had assisted the Bulgarian Secret Service.

== Early life ==
Georgi Markov was born on 1 March 1929, in Knyazhevo, a Sofia neighbourhood. In 1946, he graduated from the Gymnasium (high school) and began university studies in industrial chemistry. Initially, Markov worked as a chemical engineer and a teacher in a technical school. At the age of 19, he became ill with tuberculosis which forced him to attend various hospitals. His first literary attempts occurred during that time. In 1957, a novel, The Night of Caesium, appeared. Soon another novel, The Ajax Winners (1959) and two collections of short stories (1961) were published. In 1962, Markov published the novel Men which won the annual award of the Union of Bulgarian Writers and he was subsequently accepted as a member of the Union, a prerequisite for a professional career in literature. Georgi Markov started working at the Narodna Mladezh Publishing House. The story collections A Portrait of My Double (1966) and The Women of Warsaw (1968) secured his place as one of the most talented young writers in Bulgaria. Markov also wrote a number of plays but most of them were never staged or were removed from theatre repertoire by the Communist censors: To Crawl Under the Rainbow, The Elevator, Assassination in the Cul-de-Sac, Stalinists and I Was Him. The novel The Roof was halted in mid-printing since it described as a fact and in allegorical terms the collapse of the roof of the Lenin steel mill. Markov was one of the authors of the popular TV series Every Kilometer (Всеки километър or At Every Milestone) which created the character of the Second World War detective Velinsky and his nemesis the Resistance fighter Deyanov.

Although some of his works were banned, Georgi Markov had become a successful author. He was among the writers and poets that Todor Zhivkov tried to co-opt and coerce into serving the regime with their works. During this period Markov had a bohemian lifestyle, which was unknown to most Bulgarians.

== Writer and dissident ==
Although not yet confirmed, Markov's first published work was considered to be "The Whiskey Record Holder", which was issued in the newspaper "Narodna kultura." There are at least three versions as to when he debuted as an author:

- Slav Karaslavov's version (1972) claims that Markov debuts in the newspaper "Stershel" in 1952. In the same year, signed by B. Aprilov and G. Markov, the feuilleton "The Forest of Horrors" was published in the newspaper.
- Yordan Vasilev's version (1990) – according to him, Markov debuts in the newspaper "Narodna armia" in 1951. Signed as "Georgi Markov", "The Whiskey Record Holder" (7 July 1951) and "Bolshevik" (12 December 1951) were published.
- Aleksander Kostov's version (1996) says that Markov debuts in the newspaper "Zemedelsko zname" in 1947. Signed as "G. Markov", many of his works, some of which are "Giordano Bruno" (19 February 1947) and "Heinrich Heine" (21 February 1947), were published.

In 1969, Markov left for Bologna, Italy, where his brother lived. His initial idea was to wait until his status with the Bulgarian authorities improved, but he gradually changed his mind and decided to stay in the West, especially after September 1971 when the Bulgarian government refused to extend his passport. Markov moved to London, where he learned English and started working for the Bulgarian section of the BBC World Service (1972). He tried to work for the film industry, hoping for help from Peter Uvaliev, but was unsuccessful. Later he also worked with Deutsche Welle and Radio Free Europe. In 1972, Markov's membership in the Union of Bulgarian Writers was suspended and he was sentenced in absentia to six years and six months in prison for his defection.

His works were withdrawn from libraries and bookshops and his name was not mentioned by the official Bulgarian media until 1989. The Bulgarian Secret Service opened a file on Markov under the code name "Wanderer." In 1974, his play To Crawl Under the Rainbow was staged in London, while in Edinburgh the play Archangel Michael, written in English, won first prize. The novel The Right Honourable Chimpanzee, co-written with David Phillips, was published after his death. In 1975, Markov married Annabel Dilke. The couple had a daughter, Alexandra-Raina, born a year later.

Between 1975 and 1978, Markov worked on his In Absentia Reports, an analysis of life in Communist Bulgaria. They were broadcast weekly on Radio Free Europe. Their criticism of the Communist government and of the Party leader Todor Zhivkov made Markov, even more, an enemy of the regime.

Today, we Bulgarians present a fine example of what it is to exist under a lid which we cannot lift and which we no longer believe someone else can lift... And the unending slogan which millions of loudspeakers blare out is that everyone is fighting for the happiness of others. Every word spoken under the lid constantly changes its meaning. Lies and truths swap their values with the frequency of an alternating current...We have seen how personality vanishes, how individuality is destroyed, how the spiritual life of a whole people is corrupted to turn them into a listless flock of sheep. We have seen so many of those demonstrations which humiliate human dignity, where normal people are expected to applaud some paltry mediocrity who has proclaimed himself a demi-god and condescendingly waves to them from the heights of his police inviolability...

— Georgi Markov describing life under an authoritarian regime in The Truth that Killed

In 1978, Markov was killed in London (see below), allegedly by an operative connected to the KGB and the Bulgarian secret police under Zhivkov. His In Absentia Reports were published in Bulgaria in 1990, after the end of the Communist government.

In 2000, Markov was posthumously awarded the Order of Stara Planina, Bulgaria's most prestigious honour, for his "significant contribution to the Bulgarian literature, drama and non-fiction and for his exceptional civic position and confrontation to the Communist regime."

== Assassination ==
On 7 September 1978, Markov walked across Waterloo Bridge spanning the River Thames and waited to take a bus to his job at the BBC. While at the bus stop, he reported feeling a slight sharp pain, as if from an insect bite or sting, on his right thigh. He reportedly saw a man picking up an umbrella off the ground behind him.

When he arrived at work at the BBC World Service offices, he noticed a small red pimple had formed at the site of the sting he had felt earlier and the pain had not lessened or stopped. He told at least one of his colleagues at the BBC, Theo Lirkov, about this incident. That evening, he developed a fever and was admitted to St James' Hospital in Balham, where he died four days later, on 11 September 1978, at the age of 49. His grave is in a small churchyard at the Church of St Candida and Holy Cross in Whitchurch Canonicorum.

=== Later investigation and aftermath ===
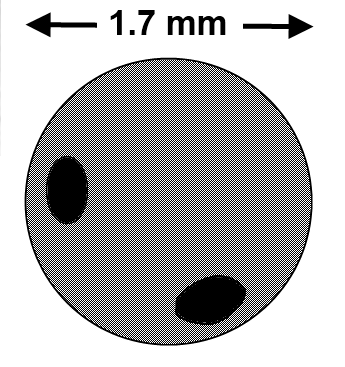
Ricin bullet. For comparison, a pin head is about 2 mm.

Bernard Riley, the physician treating Markov, considered many possible causes of his illness, including that he had been bitten by a venomous tropical snake. Riley had the inflamed area at the back of his leg x-rayed, but no foreign object was detected at this time. Due to the circumstances and statements Markov made to doctors expressing the suspicion that he had been poisoned, the Metropolitan Police ordered a thorough autopsy of his body. Rufus Crompton performed it, noting a red mark on the back of Markov's leg. He cut a tissue sample from the area, with a matching sample from the other leg. These samples were sent for further analysis at the Porton Down chemical and biological weapons laboratory. There, David Gall, the Research Medical Officer, found a tiny pellet in the tissue sample.

The pellet measured 1.70 millimetres (0.067 in) in diameter and was composed of 90% platinum and 10% iridium. It had two holes with diameters of 0.35 mm (0.014 in) drilled through it, producing an X-shaped cavity. Further examination by experts from Porton Down could not detect any remnant of poison. Considering possible poisons, scientists hypothesised that the pellet might have contained ricin.

Porton Down scientists also thought that a sugary substance had been used to coat the tiny holes, creating a bubble that trapped the poison inside the cavities, with a specially crafted coating designed to melt at 37 °C (99 °F): human body temperature. After the pellet was inside Markov, the coating might have melted and the poison released to be absorbed into the bloodstream and killed him.

Regardless of whether the doctors treating Markov had known that the poison might have been ricin, the result would have been the same, as no antidote exists for ricin.

A diagram of a possible umbrella gun

Ten days before the assassination, an attempt was made to kill another Bulgarian defector, Vladimir Kostov, in the same manner as Markov, in a Paris Métro station.

KGB defector Oleg Kalugin alleged that the Bulgarian Secret Service arranged the murder with help from the Soviet KGB. Nobody has been charged with Markov's murder, largely because most documents relating to it are unavailable, probably destroyed. Kalugin said that Markov had been killed using an umbrella gun.

The Sunday Times reported that the prime suspect was an Italian, Francesco Gullino or Giullino, who was last known to be living in Denmark. A British documentary, The Umbrella Assassin (2006), interviewed people associated with the case in Bulgaria, Britain, Denmark and America, and revealed that Giullino was alive and well, and still travelling freely throughout Europe. There were reports in June 2008 that Scotland Yard had renewed its interest in the case. Detectives were sent to Bulgaria and requests were made to interview relevant individuals. Gullino died in Austria in August 2021.

=== In popular culture ===
The Markov assassination is the subject of a test in the first season of the show MythBusters. Adam Savage and Jamie Hyneman test if the assassination could be feasible using an umbrella gun. After testing the duo confirm that an umbrella gun could be used in an assassination in this way.

The television show Breaking Bad mentions the assassination when protagonists Walter White and Jesse Pinkman are attempting to devise a plan to kill a regional kingpin threatening their lives.

In August 2018 the case was the subject of the BBC Radio 4 programme The Reunion.

Danish journalist Ulrik Skotte directed a TV documentary and wrote a book on the Markov case, both under the title The Umbrella Murder.

A replica of the umbrella used to assassinate Markov is on display at the International Spy Museum in Washington, DC., US

=== Similar attacks ===
On 11 May 2012, a German man died almost a year after having been stabbed with an umbrella in the city of Hanover. German police – who noted a resemblance to the Markov case – analyzed the syringe which the victim had managed to take from the perpetrator, and found dimethylmercury; the reported cause of death was mercury poisoning.

In 2016, police in Chennai, India solved three separate murders when the four killers confessed to having used an umbrella tipped with a potassium cyanide-filled syringe. They had ridden past the victims on a bike and jabbed them in the thigh.

== See also ==
- List of Eastern Bloc defectors
- List of unsolved murders in the United Kingdom
- Incidents involving ricin
- Poisoning of Alexander Litvinenko
- Salisbury poisoning
- List of journalists killed in Europe
- The Executioner (Kisyov novel)
