= State Intelligence Agency (Bulgaria) =

Bulgarian governmental intelligence agency

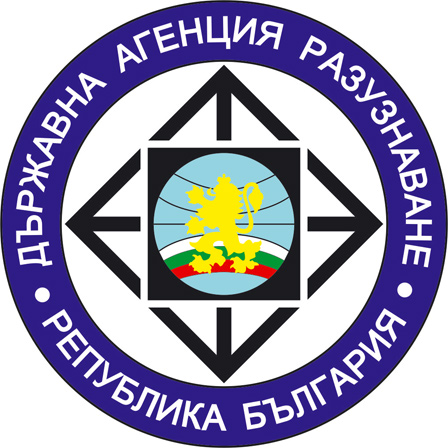
Seal of The State Intelligence Agency

The State Intelligence Agency (SIA) (Bulgarian: Държавна агенция "Разузнаване", romanized: Dǎržavna Agencija "Razuznavane") is a Bulgarian foreign intelligence service, which obtains, processes, analyzes and provides the state leadership with intelligence, assessments, analyses and prognoses, related to the national security, interests and priorities of the Republic of Bulgaria.

== History ==
The history of intelligence agencies in Bulgaria dates back to 1925 when the Law on Administration & Police (Закона за администрацията и полицията, Zakona za Administracijata i Policijata) & the Police Directorate of the State Security Department set up a Foreign Policy Service (външнополитическа служба, Vohnšnopolitičeska služba). Foreign Policy Intelligence existed as from 1925 to 1990 as part of the Police Directorate (Дирекция на полицията) which existed from 1925 to 1944.

In the wake of the post-communist era the foreign/external intelligence activities, formerly carried out by the First Main Directorate of the Committee for State Security, were separated and consolidated in the National Intelligence Service. Reforms in the security sector in Bulgaria began as early as 1991; the period was characterized by the deep mistrust of the successors of the Communist-era services and by dismissal of several experienced officials on political grounds. The passage from the Party-Interior-Defence architecture to the President-Prime Minister model led to a downgrading of efficiency. The National Intelligence Service was subordinated to the president:

The Kosovo War was a milestone and a turning point for the Bulgarian foreign policy and for the intelligence community because of the great amount of practical co-operation with the major NATO countries, as well as an unusual amount of information and intelligence sharing, although no formal contact was established. Alongside military and financial intelligence reform, a Security Council, subordinated to the prime minister, was created with the aim of coordinating the efforts of the whole of the intelligence community. On October 1, 2015 the National Intelligence Service was transformed into the State Intelligence Agency with the State Intelligence Agency Act, passed by the XLIII National Assembly.

== Mission ==
The State Intelligence Agency (SIA) is a security service, which obtains, processes, analyzes and provides the state leadership with intelligence, assessments, analyses and prognoses, related to the national security, interests and priorities of the Republic of Bulgaria. SIA is part of the intelligence community, defined in the National Security Strategy as a system of state bodies that provide information and analysis, assess the risks and threats to the national security, and plan and implement due countermeasures.

The agency also takes part in the activities of the intelligence communities of the European Union (EU) and the North-Atlantic Treaty Organization (NATO).

SIA cooperates with the other state institutions and structures that are part of the national security system, which perform functions in the sphere of diplomacy, defence, intelligence, counterintelligence, criminal investigation, law enforcement and security.

The mission of SIA is to protect the national security and the interests of the Republic of Bulgaria, but also to support the state leadership in their efforts to fulfill the national priorities, by providing the latest and most reliable intelligence and analysis of events and developments pertaining to the national security, foreign policy, economy and the safeguarding of the constitutional order.

To this end, SIA carries out intelligence operations and obtains, stores, summarizes, analyzes and provides intelligence information.

Intelligence information is any information, obtained by the agency about foreign countries, organizations and individuals, or Bulgarian organizations and individuals related to these, which is of significance for the national security of the Republic of Bulgaria.

Different information materials – such as reports, analyses and briefings – are prepared on the basis of the acquired intelligence information and provided to the state leadership.

The agency supplies intelligence information to the speaker of the National Assembly; the president of the Republic; the prime minister and the Members of Cabinet; and other government agencies in accordance with their competence.

The agency supplies intelligence reports, identical in volume and content to

the president of the Republic, the speaker of the National Assembly and the prime minister.

SIA reports directly to the Council of Ministers, while it performs tasks set by the prime minister and by the president of the country, in consultation with the prime minister.

The agency does not carry out assignments of domestic political nature.

SIA’s functions are:

- protection of national security and the interests of the Republic of Bulgaria related to its national security;
- intelligence and analytical support for the prevention, detection and counteraction of any harm in the area of national security, foreign policy, the economy and the safeguarding of the constitutional order;
- provision of assistance to the authorities in pursuing the priorities of the Republic of Bulgaria in the field of national security, foreign policy, the economy and the safeguarding of the constitutional order.

== Priority areas of activity ==
- Terrorism and other asymmetric threats
- The modern risks and threats to the security and interests of our country have the distinct feature of being dynamic, unpredictable and asymmetric in nature. They call for intensive cooperation between the structures in the national security system and a comprehensive approach to neutralizing them. With respect to terrorism and asymmetric threats, SIA obtains and analyzes information, mainly related to countering terrorism, extremism, organized crime, illegal traffic of people, drugs, etc.
- Foreign political and economic security
- Among SIA’s priority areas of activity is the provision of up-to-date, reliable information which is of vital importance in the pursuit of Bulgarian foreign and security policies, for the protection of national security and national interests in the sphere of economy and energy, as well as for the fulfillment of our country’s obligations in accordance with our membership in different international organizations.
- Cooperation with related services of EU and NATO member-states and from other countries.
- The transnational nature of the risks and threats to the security brings to the forefront the need to share information on a bilateral and multilateral level. The mutual supplementation of intelligence expertise provides an opportunity to consolidate data from different sources, but also to supply the state leadership with the necessary information about a region or a country, while saving resources and combining capabilities. The information exchange between SIA and the partner services with respect to countering international terrorism, illegal migration, the situation in regions generating crises, is extremely intensive. In its priority areas of activity, SIA carries out intelligence operations and obtains, stores, summarizes, analyzes and provides intelligence information, on the basis of which different information materials – such as reports, analyses and briefings – are prepared and provided to the state leadership.

== Main tasks ==
- Obtaining sources of up-to-date intelligence on the major areas of activities, recruitment of sources;
- Development and use of proprietary special equipment and systems in support of its operations and for communication purposes, use of special intelligence gathering tools outside and within the territory of the Republic of Bulgaria, subject to terms, conditions and procedures laid down by the Special Intelligence Means Act;
- Assessment and analysis of the intelligence, obtained by way of specific methods and means, as well as of the information from open sources;
- Exchange of information and analysis with partner services and within the intelligence communities of the EU and NATO;
- Preparation of reports and analyses for the state leadership and the other customers of SIA;
- Selection of applicants for positions within the agency and to background checking to ascertain their integrity and suitability for handling classified information;
- Ensuring the safety of the diplomatic representations of the Republic of Bulgaria abroad – protection and physical security; technical security; personnel protection; information security and measures preventing unregulated access to classified information;
- Creation and organization of a proprietary operational archive, automated information system and proprietary cryptographic keys tools and systems for the protection of information;
- Protection of classified information collected, processed and stored by the agency against unauthorized access, and protection of official correspondence;
- Protection of officers and facilities allocated to the agency for, or in connection with, its operation;
- Coordination of the information exchange and interaction with other government authorities from the national security system in fulfillment of its tasks.

== Control ==
The activities of the State Intelligence Agency as part of the system of national security protection and the agency’s chairperson are subject to parliamentary, administrative, judicial and civil control under Article 21 of the Act on the Management and Functioning of the System of National Security Protection.
