= Shannon Richardson =

American actress and convicted felon (born 1977)

- Born: Shannon Rogers; 31 August 1977 (age 49); Bowie County, Texas, U.S.
- Other names: Shannon Rogers Guess; Shannon Rogers Guess Richardson; Shannon Guess Richardson
- Occupation: Actress
- Years active: 2009–2013
- Known for: Sending letters laced with ricin
- Spouse: Nathan Richardson (m. 2011; div. 2014)
- Children: 6
- Status: Incarcerated
- Criminal charge: Possession of a toxin for use as a weapon
- Penalty: 18 years' imprisonment $367,000 in restitution

Details
- Span of crimes: May 2013 – June 2013
- Imprisoned at: FMC Carswell

Shannon Guess Richardson (née Rogers; born August 31, 1977) is an American former actress. She worked in television and film roles, including The Walking Dead, but is best known for sending ricin-laced letters to U.S. president Barack Obama and New York City mayor Michael Bloomberg, while attempting to frame her husband. She was convicted and sentenced to 18 years' imprisonment in July 2014.

== Career ==
Richardson appeared in minor roles in television series such as The Vampire Diaries, Franklin & Bash, and The Walking Dead.

== Personal life ==
Richardson was abandoned by her mother at the age of two and raised by her father, Terry Rogers. Rogers worked at General Motors in Doraville, Georgia. She was the oldest of three children, having one younger brother and one younger sister. At the time of her arrest, Richardson lived in New Boston, Texas. She has been married three times. On October 8, 2011, she married Nathan Richardson, a U.S. Army veteran who works as a mechanic in a military depot. He filed for divorce in June 2013.

At the time of her arrest in June 2013, Richardson had five children, ranging in age from 4 to 19 with her two previous husbands and was pregnant with her sixth child. On July 4, 2013, Richardson gave birth to a boy, named Brody, while in custody. Officials said that the baby was born four months prematurely, weighed only two pounds at birth, and that he needed to remain hospitalized. In August 2013, Nathan Richardson won temporary custody of Brody.

== Arrest and conviction ==
In May 2013, while going through a divorce, Richardson called the police and falsely accused her husband, Nathan Richardson, of mailing letters laced with the poison ricin to several politicians. Nathan Richardson was never charged in regard to the matter. He told investigators that his wife set him up. Investigators found evidence that she had mailed the ricin-laced letters herself in an effort to frame her estranged husband.

Richardson was arrested on June 7, 2013, for her alleged involvement in ricin-laced letters being sent to politicians such as President Barack Obama and New York City mayor Michael Bloomberg. She was charged with "mailing a threatening letter to President Barack Obama".

On June 6, Richardson confessed that she had mailed the three letters, knowing they contained ricin, but claimed her husband made her mail the letters. On June 20, a federal judge ordered Richardson be given a psychological examination, based on a request from her court-appointed attorney, who said she had shown "a pattern of behavior" that raised questions about her ability to assist in her own criminal defense.

On June 28, Richardson was indicted and charged in the mailing of ricin-laced letters to President Obama and Mayor Bloomberg. The three-count indictment accused her of mailing three threatening letters around May 20 to Obama, Bloomberg, and Mark Glaze, the director of Mayors Against Illegal Guns. A criminal complaint filed on June 7 revealed that the FBI had used Mail Isolation Control and Tracking (MICT), a previously undisclosed mass surveillance program run by the U.S. Postal Service, to narrow its investigation to Richardson.

On November 22, Richardson reached a plea agreement on three counts. On December 10, she pleaded guilty and was sent to the Texas State Prison System. The U.S. government contracts with county and state officials nationwide to hold federal prisoners pending trial. On July 16, 2014, most of the charges against Richardson were dropped as per her plea agreement. The charges of making threats against the President of the United States and mailing threatening communications were dropped. Richardson was convicted of the charge pertaining to manufacture and possession of a biological weapon and sentenced to 18 years in prison, $367,222 in restitution, $100 special assessment fee (for psychological testing), 5 years' supervised release and ordered to undergo psychological treatment while in prison and continue psychological treatment after her release.

On March 16, 2015, the Investigation Discovery channel aired episode 10 of season 6 of the television show Who the (Bleep) Did I Marry? which featured Shannon Richardson's case as told by her ex-husband. The episode was titled "Poison Love".

In March 2015, Shannon Richardson filed suit under 42 U.S.C. § 1983, for deprivation of rights while imprisoned. The civil action was "dismissed with prejudice" on March 7, 2015.

In September 2025, Richardson was denied a request by Judge Robert W. Schroeder III to reduce her sentence from 18 years to 12 years after she filed the request in September 2024, citing the lack of medical attention related to an MRSA infection that caused Richardson to have partial paralysis, debilitating memory loss and kidney disease.

Richardson is being held in a federal prison in Fort Worth, Texas, with a projected release date of November 18, 2028.
