= EDEM1 =

Protein-coding gene in the species Homo sapiens

Identifiers
- Aliases: EDEM1, EDEM, ER degradation enhancing alpha-mannosidase like protein 1
- External IDs: OMIM: 607673; MGI: 2180139; GeneCards: EDEM1

Gene location (Human)
Chr.	Chromosome 3 (human)
Band	3p26.1	Start	5,187,646 bp
Band	3p26.1	End	5,219,958 bp

Gene location (Mouse)
Chr.	Chromosome 6 (mouse)
Band	6|6 E2	Start	108,805,602 bp
Band	6|6 E2	End	108,836,317 bp
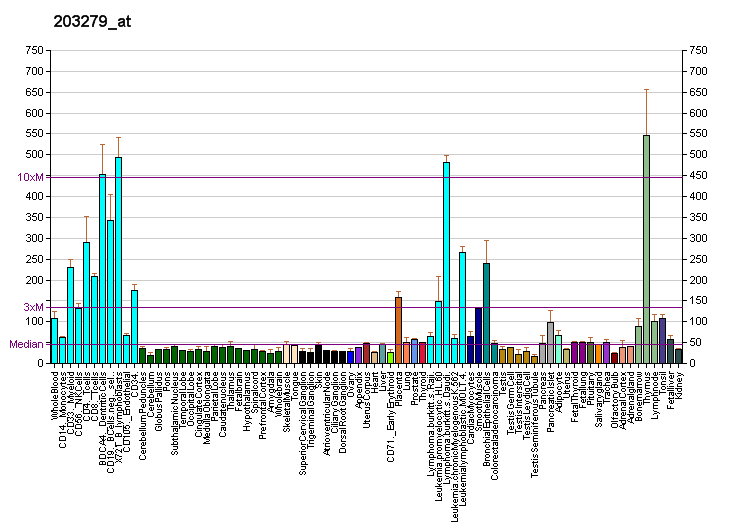
RNA expression pattern
Bgee	Human / Mouse (ortholog); Top expressed in: bone marrow cell; thymus; liver; right lobe of liver; lymph node; epithelium of nasopharynx; decidua; appendix; tonsil; stromal cell of endometrium / Top expressed in: lacrimal gland; thymus; parotid gland; stroma of bone marrow; crypt of lieberkuhn of small intestine; left lobe of liver; granulocyte; decidua; submandibular gland; islet of Langerhans; More reference expression data
BioGPS	More reference expression data
Gene ontology
Molecular function	calcium ion binding; misfolded protein binding; mannosyl-oligosaccharide 1,2-alpha-mannosidase activity; protein binding; catalytic activity
Cellular component	integral component of membrane; endoplasmic reticulum membrane; membrane; integral component of endoplasmic reticulum membrane; endoplasmic reticulum; endoplasmic reticulum quality control compartment; Golgi membrane; aggresome
Biological process	N-glycan processing; positive regulation of retrograde protein transport, ER to cytosol; trimming of terminal mannose on C branch; IRE1-mediated unfolded protein response; response to unfolded protein; ubiquitin-dependent glycoprotein ERAD pathway; mannose trimming involved in glycoprotein ERAD pathway; ubiquitin-dependent ERAD pathway
Sources:Amigo / QuickGO
Orthologs
Databases	NCBI: entry; OMA: entry
Species	Human	Mouse
Entrez	9695	192193
Ensembl	ENSG00000134109	ENSMUSG00000030104
UniProt	Q92611	Q925U4
RefSeq (mRNA)	NM_014674	NM_138677
RefSeq (protein)	NP_055489	NP_619618
Location (UCSC)	Chr 3: 5.19 – 5.22 Mb	Chr 6: 108.81 – 108.84 Mb
PubMed search
- Wikidata
View/Edit Human	View/Edit Mouse

ER degradation-enhancing alpha-mannosidase-like 1 is an enzyme that in humans is encoded by the EDEM1 gene.
