= Ricin =

Type of lectin

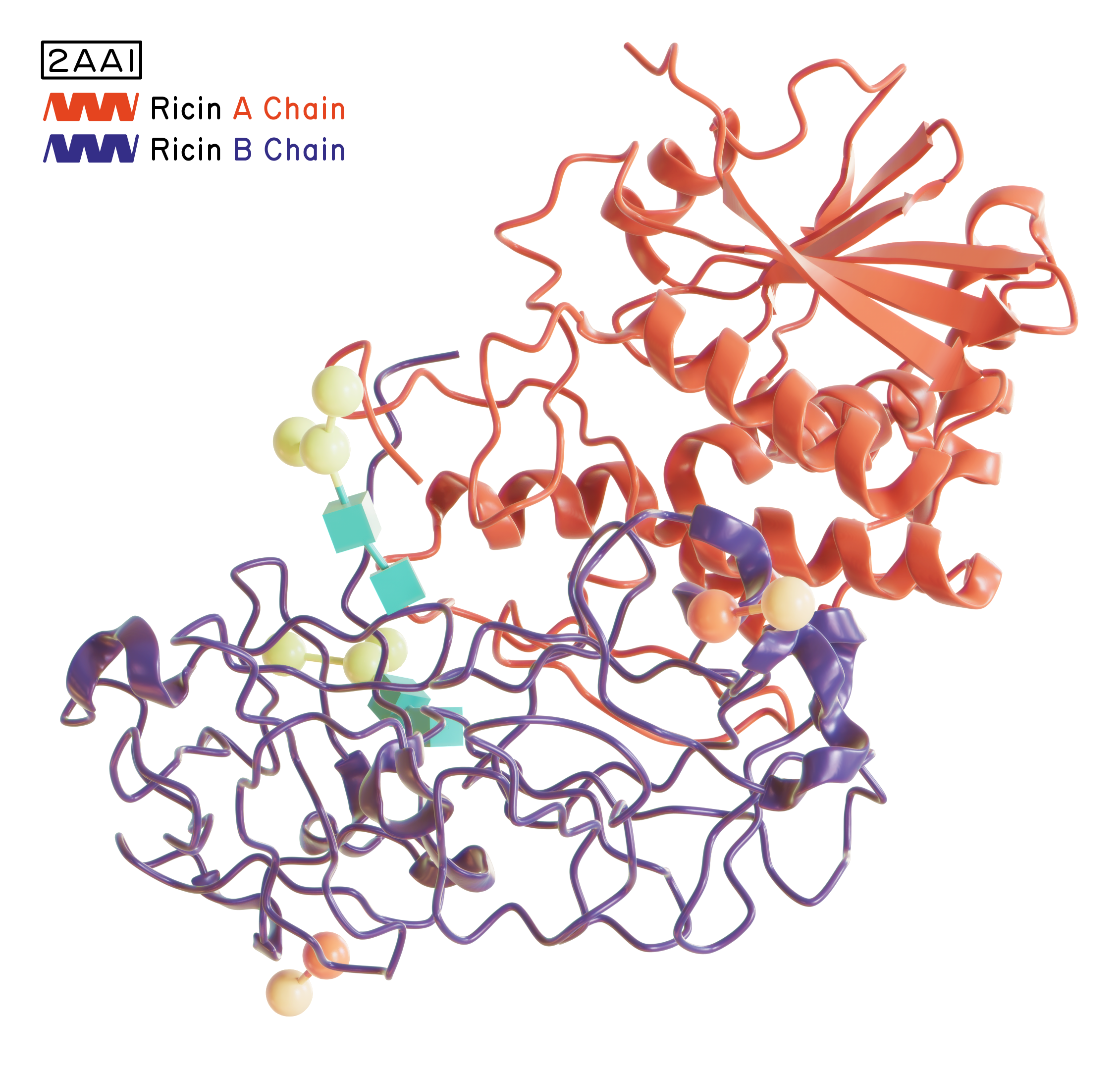
- Ricin structure (PDB: 2AAI)

Identifiers
- Organism: Ricinus communis
- Symbol: RCOM_2159910
- Entrez: 8287993
- Orthologs: NCBI: entry; OMA: entry
- RefSeq (mRNA): XM_002534603.1
- RefSeq (Prot): XP_002534649.1
- UniProt: P02879

Other data
- EC number: 3.2.2.22
- Chromosome: whole genome: 0 - 0.01 Mb
Search for
- Structures: Swiss-model
- Domains: InterPro

Ribosome-inactivating protein (Ricin A chain)

Identifiers
- Symbol: RIP
- Pfam: PF00161
- InterPro: IPR001574
- PROSITE: PDOC00248
- SCOP2: 1paf / SCOPe / SUPFAM
Available protein structures:
- PDB: IPR001574 PF00161 (ECOD; PDBsum)
- AlphaFold: IPR001574; PF00161

Ricin-type beta-trefoil lectin domain (Ricin B chain)

Identifiers
- Symbol: N/A
- Pfam: PF00652
- Pfam clan: CL0066
- PROSITE: IPR000772
- SCOP2: 1abr / SCOPe / SUPFAM
- CAZy: CBM13
- CDD: cd00161
Available protein structures:
- PDB: PF00652 (ECOD; PDBsum)
- AlphaFold: PF00652

Ricin (/ˈraɪsɪn/ RY-sin) is a highly potent toxin produced in the seeds of the castor plant, Ricinus communis. It weakly binds carbohydrates, making it a lectin, specifically a hemagglutinin due to it binding the carbohydrates on red blood cells. In contrast to its very weak carbohydrate-binding, ricin is an extremely potent toxalbumin, a plant protein which targets ribosomes. This is in contrast to another compound in castor seeds, Ricinus communis agglutinin (RCA), which is a very weakly cytotoxic but powerful hemagglutinin and is responsible for the classically observed coagulation of blood upon exposure to castor seed extracts.

The median lethal dose (LD_{50}) of ricin for mice is around 22 micrograms per kilogram of body mass via intraperitoneal injection. Oral exposure to ricin is far less toxic. An estimated lethal oral dose in humans is approximately one milligram per 2 kilogram of body mass. Ricin was first discovered by Peter Hermann Stillmark in his 1888 PhD thesis. Ricin is chemically similar to robin.

== Biochemistry ==
Ricin is classified as a type 2 ribosome-inactivating protein (RIP)[N.B]. Whereas type 1 RIPs are composed of a single protein chain that possesses catalytic activity, type 2 RIPs, also known as holotoxins, are composed of two different protein chains that form a heterodimeric complex. Type 2 RIPs consist of an A chain that is functionally equivalent to a type 1 RIP, covalently connected by a single disulfide bond to a B chain that is catalytically inactive, but serves to mediate transport of the A-B protein complex from the cell surface, via vesicle carriers, to the lumen of the endoplasmic reticulum (ER). Both type 1 and type 2 RIPs are functionally active against ribosomes in vitro; however, only type 2 RIPs display cytotoxicity due to the lectin-like properties of the B chain. To display its ribosome-inactivating function, the ricin disulfide bond must be reductively cleaved.

=== Biosynthesis ===
Ricin is synthesized in the endosperm of castor oil plant seeds. The ricin precursor protein is 576 amino acid residues in length and contains a signal peptide (residues 1–35), the ricin A chain (36–302), a linker peptide (303–314), and the ricin B chain (315–576). The N-terminal signal sequence delivers the prepropolypeptide to the endoplasmic reticulum (ER) and then the signal peptide is cleaved off. Within the lumen of the ER the propolypeptide is glycosylated and a protein disulfide isomerase catalyzes disulfide bond formation between cysteines 294 and 318. The propolypeptide is further glycosylated within the Golgi apparatus and transported to protein storage bodies. The propolypeptide is cleaved within protein bodies by an endopeptidase to produce the mature ricin protein that is composed of a 267 residue A chain and a 262 residue B chain that are covalently linked by a single disulfide bond.

=== Structure ===
In terms of structure, ricin closely resembles abrin-a, an isomer of abrin. The quaternary structure of ricin is a globular, glycosylated heterodimer of approximately 60–65 kDa. Ricin toxin A chain and ricin toxin B chain are of similar molecular weights, approximately 32 kDa and 34 kDa, respectively.

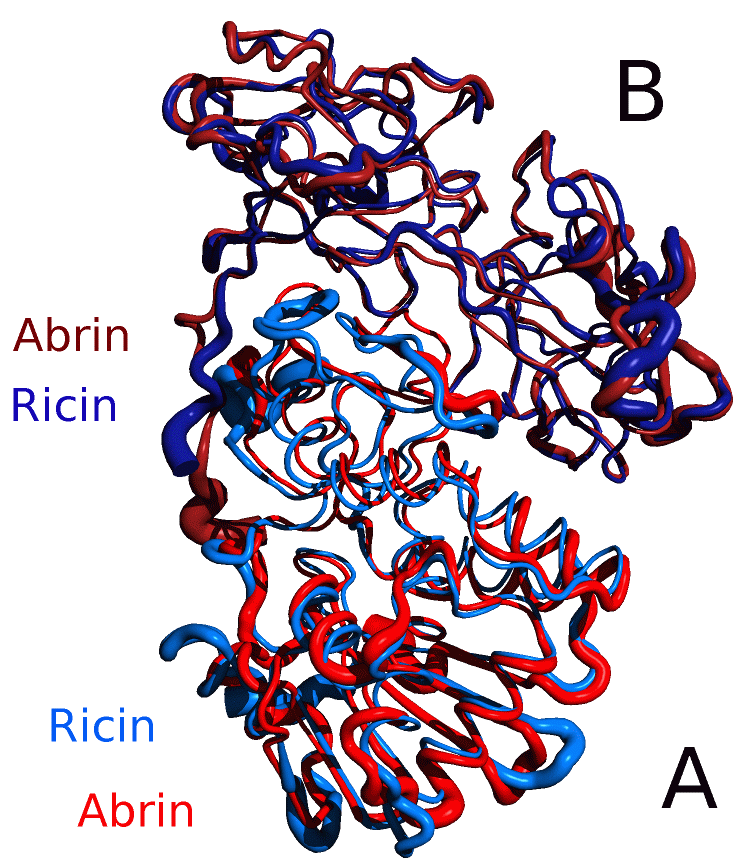
A comparison of the similar structures of abrin-a (red) and ricin (blue)

- Ricin toxin A chain (RTA) is an N-glycoside hydrolase composed of 267 amino acids. It has three structural domains with approximately 50% of the polypeptide arranged into alpha-helices and beta-sheets. The three domains form a pronounced cleft that is the active site of RTA.
- Ricin toxin B chain (RTB) is a lectin composed of 262 amino acids that is able to bind terminal galactose residues on cell surfaces. RTB forms a bilobal, barbell-like structure lacking alpha-helices or beta-sheets where individual lobes contain three subdomains. At least one of these three subdomains in each homologous lobe possesses a sugar-binding pocket that gives RTB its functional character.

While other plants contain the protein chains found in ricin, both protein chains must be present to produce toxic effects. For example, plants that contain only protein chain A, such as barley, are not toxic because without the link to protein chain B, protein chain A cannot enter the cell and do damage to ribosomes.

=== Entry into the cytoplasm ===
Ricin B chain binds complex carbohydrates on the surface of eukaryotic cells containing either terminal N-acetylgalactosamine or beta-1,4-linked galactose residues. In addition, the mannose-type glycans of ricin are able to bind to cells that express mannose receptors. RTB has been shown to bind to the cell surface on the order of 10^{6}–10^{8} ricin molecules per cell surface.

The profuse binding of ricin to surface membranes allows internalization with all types of membrane invaginations. The holotoxin can be taken up by clathrin-coated pits, as well as by clathrin-independent pathways including caveolae and macropinocytosis. Intracellular vesicles shuttle ricin to endosomes that are delivered to the Golgi apparatus. The active acidification of endosomes is thought to have little effect on the functional properties of ricin. Because ricin is stable over a wide pH range, degradation in endosomes or lysosomes offers little or no protection against ricin. Ricin molecules are thought to follow retrograde transport via early endosomes, the trans-Golgi network, and the Golgi to enter the lumen of the endoplasmic reticulum (ER).

For ricin to function cytotoxically, RTA must be reductively cleaved from RTB to release a steric block of the RTA active site. This process is catalysed by the protein PDI (protein disulphide isomerase) that resides in the lumen of the ER. Free RTA in the ER lumen then partially unfolds and partially buries into the ER membrane, where it is thought to mimic a misfolded membrane-associated protein. Roles for the ER chaperones GRP94, EDEM and BiP have been proposed prior to the 'dislocation' of RTA from the ER lumen to the cytosol in a manner that uses components of the endoplasmic reticulum-associated protein degradation (ERAD) pathway. ERAD normally removes misfolded ER proteins to the cytosol for their destruction by cytosolic proteasomes. Dislocation of RTA requires ER membrane-integral E3 ubiquitin ligase complexes, but RTA avoids the ubiquitination that usually occurs with ERAD substrates because of its low content of lysine residues, which are the usual attachment sites for ubiquitin. Thus, RTA avoids the usual fate of dislocated proteins (destruction that is mediated by targeting ubiquitinylated proteins to the cytosolic proteasomes). In the mammalian cell cytosol, RTA then undergoes triage by the cytosolic molecular chaperones Hsc70 and Hsp90 and their co-chaperones, as well as by one subunit (RPT5) of the proteasome itself, that results in its folding to a catalytic conformation, which de-purinates ribosomes, thus halting protein synthesis.

=== Ribosome inactivation ===
RTA has rRNA N-glycosylase activity that is responsible for the cleavage of a glycosidic bond within the large rRNA of the 60S subunit of eukaryotic ribosomes. RTA specifically and irreversibly hydrolyses the N-glycosidic bond of the adenine residue at position 4324 (A4324) within the 28S rRNA, but leaves the phosphodiester backbone of the RNA intact. The ricin targets A4324 that is contained in a highly conserved sequence of 12 nucleotides universally found in eukaryotic ribosomes. The sequence, 5'-AGUACGAGAGGA-3', termed the sarcin-ricin loop, is important in binding elongation factors during protein synthesis. The depurination event rapidly and completely inactivates the ribosome, resulting in toxicity from inhibited protein synthesis. A single RTA molecule in the cytosol is capable of depurinating approximately 1500 ribosomes per minute.

=== Depurination reaction ===
Within the active site of RTA, there exist several invariant amino acid residues involved in the depurination of ribosomal RNA. Although the exact mechanism of the event is unknown, key amino acid residues identified include tyrosine at positions 80 and 123, glutamic acid at position 177, and arginine at position 180. In particular, Arg180 and Glu177 have been shown to be involved in the catalytic mechanism, and not substrate binding, with enzyme kinetic studies involving RTA mutants. The model proposed by Mozingo and Robertus, based on X-ray structures, is as follows:

1. Sarcin-ricin loop substrate binds RTA active site with target adenine stacking against Tyr80 and Tyr123.
2. Arg180 is positioned such that it can protonate N-3 of adenine and break the bond between N-9 of the adenine ring and C-1' of the ribose.
3. Bond cleavage results in an oxycarbonium ion on the ribose, stabilized by Glu177.
4. N-3 protonation of adenine by Arg180 allows deprotonation of a nearby water molecule.
5. Resulting hydroxyl attacks ribose carbonium ion.
6. Depurination of adenine results in a neutral ribose on an intact phosphodiester RNA backbone.

== Toxicity ==
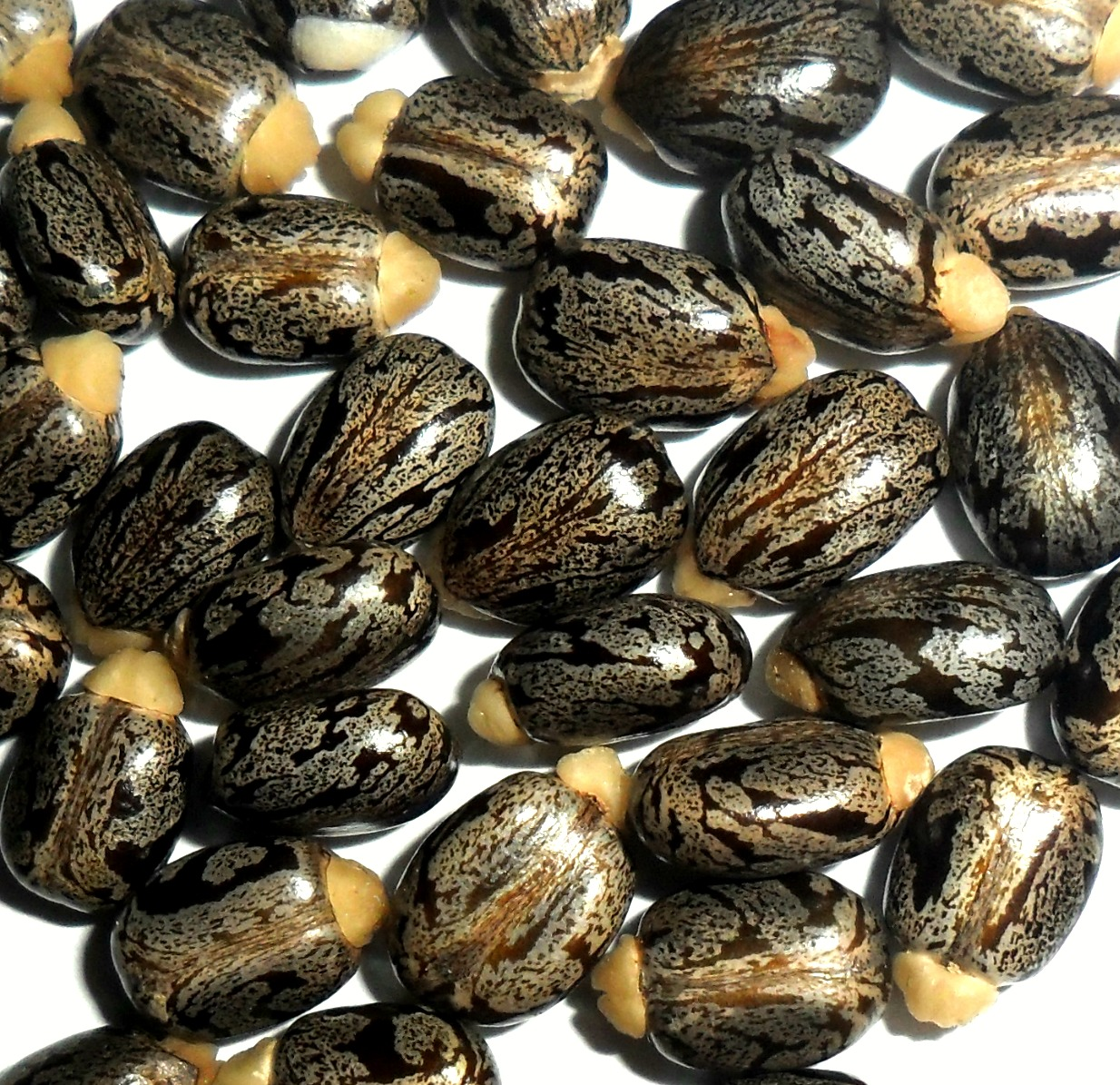
Castor beans

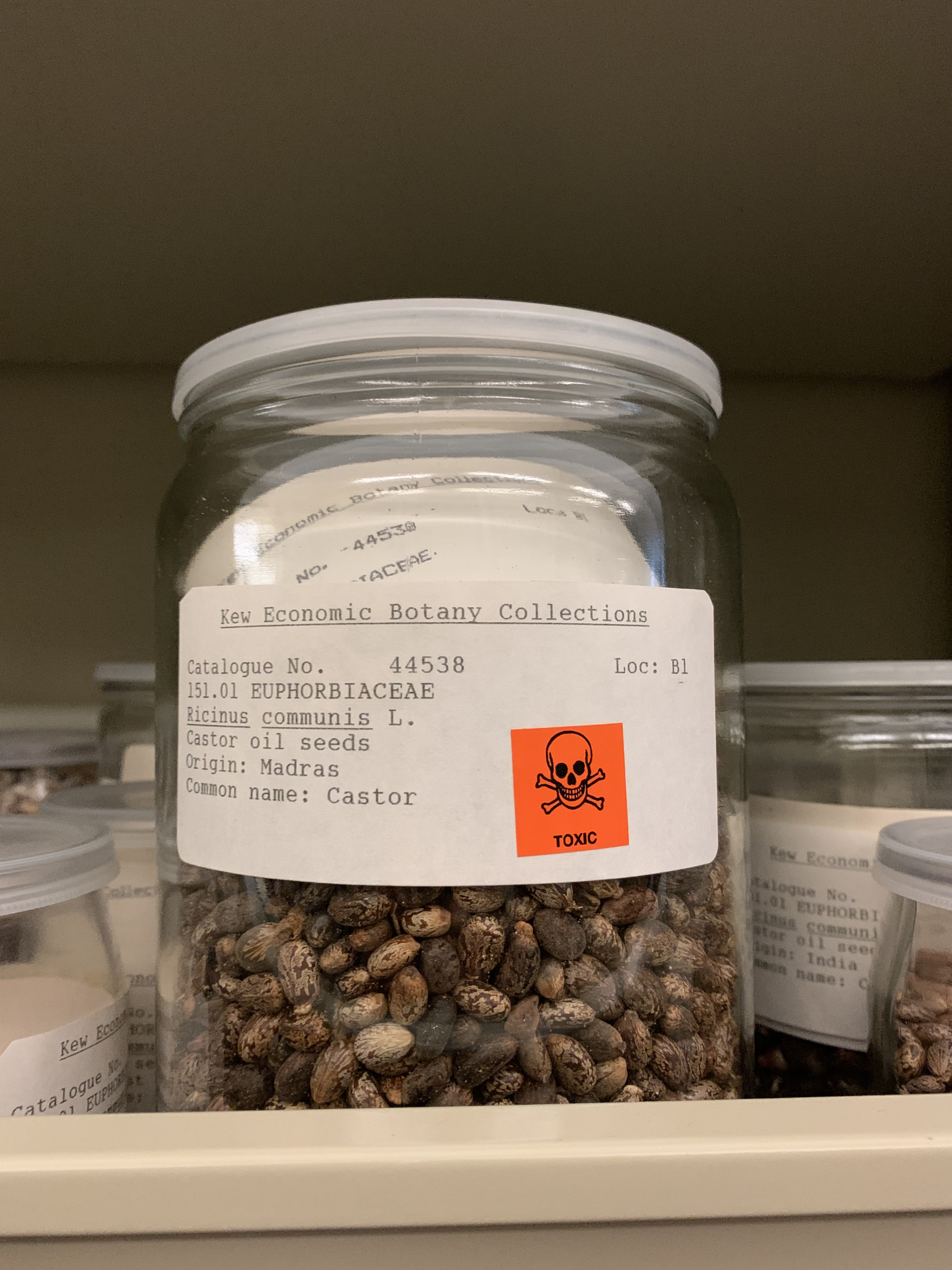
Castor oil seeds in the Royal Botanic Gardens, Kew Economic Botany Collection

Ricin is very toxic if inhaled, injected, or ingested. It can also be toxic if dust contacts the eyes or if it is absorbed through damaged skin. It acts as a toxin by inhibiting protein synthesis. Ricin is resistant, but not impervious, to digestion by peptidases. By ingestion, the pathology of ricin is largely restricted to the gastrointestinal tract, where it may cause mucosal injuries. With appropriate treatment, most patients will make a good recovery.

=== Symptoms ===
Because the symptoms are caused by failure to make protein, they may take anywhere from hours to days to appear, depending on the route of exposure and the dose. When ingested, gastrointestinal symptoms can manifest within six hours; these symptoms do not always become apparent. Within two to five days of exposure to ricin, its effects on the central nervous system, adrenal glands, kidneys, and liver appear.

Ingestion of ricin causes pain, inflammation, and hemorrhage in the mucosal membranes of the gastrointestinal system. Gastrointestinal symptoms quickly progress to severe nausea, vomiting, diarrhea, and difficulty swallowing (dysphagia). Hemorrhage causes bloody feces (melena) and vomiting blood (hematemesis). The low blood volume (hypovolemia) caused by gastrointestinal fluid loss can lead to organ failure in the pancreas, kidney, liver, and GI tract and progress to shock. Shock and organ failure are indicated by disorientation, stupor, weakness, drowsiness, excessive thirst (polydipsia), low urine production (oliguria), and bloody urine (hematuria). Victims can die of circulatory shock or organ failure; death typically occur between 3 and 5 days after oral ingestion.

Symptoms of ricin inhalation are different from those caused by ingestion. Early symptoms include a cough and fever. It can cause fatal pulmonary edema or respiratory failure.

When skin or inhalation exposure occur, ricin can cause an allergic reaction to develop. This is indicated by swelling (edema) of the eyes and lips; asthma; bronchial irritation; dry, sore throat; congestion; skin redness (erythema); skin blisters (vesication); wheezing; itchy, watery eyes; chest tightness; and skin irritation.

=== Treatment ===
An antidote has been developed by the British Armed Forces, although as of 2006, it has not yet been tested on humans. As of 2005, another antidote developed by the US military has been shown to be safe and effective in lab mice injected with antibody-rich blood mixed with ricin, and has had some human testing. Monoclonal antibodies are under scientific investigation as a possible treatment for ricin poisoning.

Symptomatic and supportive treatments are available for ricin poisoning. Existing treatments emphasize minimizing the effects of the poison. Possible treatments include intravenous fluids or electrolytes, airway management, assisted ventilation, or giving medications to remedy seizures and low blood pressure. If the ricin has been ingested recently, the stomach can be flushed by ingesting activated charcoal or by performing gastric lavage. Survivors often develop long-term organ damage.

=== Prevention ===
Vaccination is possible by injecting an inactive form of protein chain A. This vaccination is effective for several months due to the body's production of antibodies to the foreign protein. In 1978 Bulgarian defector Vladimir Kostov survived a ricin attack similar to the one on Georgi Markov, probably due to his body's production of antibodies. When a ricin-laced pellet was removed from the small of his back it was found that some of the original wax coating was still attached. For this reason only small amounts of ricin had leaked out of the pellet, producing some symptoms but allowing his body to develop immunity to further poisoning.

=== Sources ===
The seeds of Ricinus communis are commonly crushed to extract castor oil. As ricin is not oil-soluble, little is found in the extracted castor oil. The extracted oil is also heated to more than 80 °C (176 °F) to denature any ricin that may be present. The remaining spent crushed seeds, called variously the "cake", "oil cake", and "press cake", can contain up to 5% ricin. While the oil cake from coconut, peanuts, and sometimes cotton seeds can be used as cattle feed or fertilizer, the toxic nature of castor beans precludes their oil cake from being used as feed unless the ricin is first deactivated by autoclaving. Accidental ingestion of Ricinus communis cake intended for fertilizer has been reported to be responsible for fatal ricin poisoning in animals.

Deaths from ingesting castor plant seeds are rare, partly because of their indigestible seed coat, and because some of the ricin is deactivated in the stomach. The pulp from eight beans is considered dangerous to an adult. Rauber and Heard have written that close examination of early 20th century case reports indicates that public and professional perceptions of ricin toxicity "do not accurately reflect the capabilities of modern medical management".

Most acute poisoning episodes in humans are the result of oral ingestion of castor beans, 5–20 of which could prove fatal to an adult. Swallowing castor beans rarely proves to be fatal unless the bean is thoroughly chewed. The survival rate of castor bean ingestion is 98%. In 2013 a 37-year-old woman in the United States survived after ingesting 30 beans. In another case, a man ingested 200 castor beans mixed with juice in a blender and survived. Victims often manifest nausea, diarrhea, fast heart rate, low blood pressure, and seizures persisting for up to a week. Blood, plasma, or urine ricin or ricinine concentrations may be measured to confirm diagnosis. The laboratory testing usually involves immunoassay or liquid chromatography-mass spectrometry.

== Therapeutic applications ==
Although no approved therapeutics are based on ricin, it does have the potential to be used in the treatment of tumors to destroy targeted cells. Because ricin is a protein, it can be linked to a monoclonal antibody to target cancerous cells recognized by the antibody. The major problem with ricin is that its native internalization sequences are distributed throughout the protein. If any of these native internalization sequences are present in a therapeutic agent, the drug will be internalized by, and kill, untargeted non-tumorous cells as well as targeted cancerous cells.

Modifying ricin may sufficiently lessen the likelihood that the ricin component of these immunotoxins will cause the wrong cells to internalize it, while still retaining its cell-killing activity when it is internalized by the targeted cells. However, bacterial toxins, such as diphtheria toxin, which is used in denileukin diftitox, an FDA-approved treatment for leukemia and lymphoma, have proven to be more practical. A promising approach for ricin is to use the non-toxic B subunit (a lectin) as a vehicle for delivering antigens into cells, thus greatly increasing their immunogenicity. Use of ricin as an adjuvant has potential implications for developing mucosal vaccines.

== Regulation ==
In the US, ricin appears on the select agents list of the Department of Health and Human Services, and scientists must register with HHS to use ricin in their research. However, investigators under the control of less than 1000 mg are exempt from regulation.

Ricin is classified as an extremely hazardous substance in the United States as defined in Section 302 of the US Emergency Planning and Community Right-to-Know Act (42 U.S.C. 11002), and is subject to strict reporting requirements by facilities that produce, store, or use it in significant quantities.

== Chemical or biological warfare agent ==
=== History ===
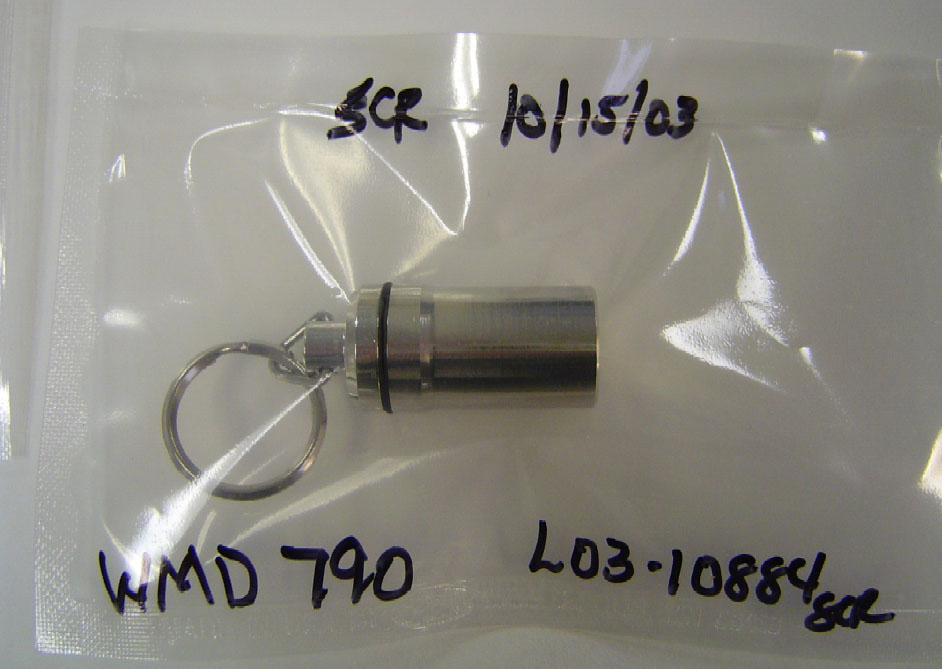
A metal vial containing ricin from the 2003 ricin letters

The United States investigated ricin for its military potential during World War I. At that time it was being considered for use either as a toxic dust or as a coating for bullets and shrapnel. The dust cloud concept could not be adequately developed, and the coated bullet/shrapnel concept would violate the Hague Convention of 1899 (adopted in U.S. law at 32 Stat. 1903), specifically Annex §2, Ch.1, Article 23, stating "... it is especially prohibited ... [t]o employ poison or poisoned arms".

In 'Ricin and Abrin', Manashi Bagchi, Shirley Zafra-Stone, Francis C. Lau, and Debasis Bagchi wrote that during World War II the United States and Canada studied ricin in cluster bombs. Though there were plans for mass production and several field trials with different bomblet concepts, the end conclusion was that it was no more economical than using phosgene. This conclusion was based on comparison of the final weapons, rather than ricin's toxicity (LCt_{50} ~10 mg/min·m^{3}). Ricin was given the military symbol W or later WA. Interest in it continued for a short period after World War II, but soon subsided when the US Army Chemical Corps began a program to weaponize sarin.

The Soviet Union possessed weaponized ricin. The KGB developed weapons using ricin which were used outside the Soviet bloc, most famously in the Markov assassination.

=== Control ===
In spite of ricin's extreme toxicity and utility as an agent of chemical/biological warfare, production of the toxin is difficult to limit. The castor bean plant from which ricin is derived is a common ornamental and can be grown at home without any special care.

Under both the 1972 Biological Weapons Convention and the 1997 Chemical Weapons Convention, ricin is listed as a schedule 1 controlled substance. Despite this, more than 1 million metric tons (1,100,000 short tons) of castor beans are processed each year, and approximately 5% of the total is rendered into a waste containing negligible concentrations of undenatured ricin toxin.

Ricin is several orders of magnitude less toxic than botulinum or tetanus toxin, but the latter are harder to come by. Compared to botulinum or anthrax as biological weapons or chemical weapons, the quantity of ricin required to achieve LD_{50} over a large geographic area (100 km^{2}) is significantly more than an agent such as anthrax (8 tonnes of ricin vs. only kilogram quantities of anthrax). Ricin is easy to produce, but is not as practical or likely to cause as many casualties as other agents. Ricin is easily denatured by temperatures over 80 °C (176 °F) meaning many methods of deploying ricin would generate enough heat to denature it. Once deployed, an area contaminated with ricin remains dangerous until the bonds between chain A or B have been broken, a process that takes two or three days. In contrast, anthrax spores may remain lethal for decades. Jan van Aken, a German expert on biological weapons, explained in a report for The Sunshine Project that Al Qaeda's experiments with ricin suggest their inability to produce botulinum or anthrax.

== Vaccination ==
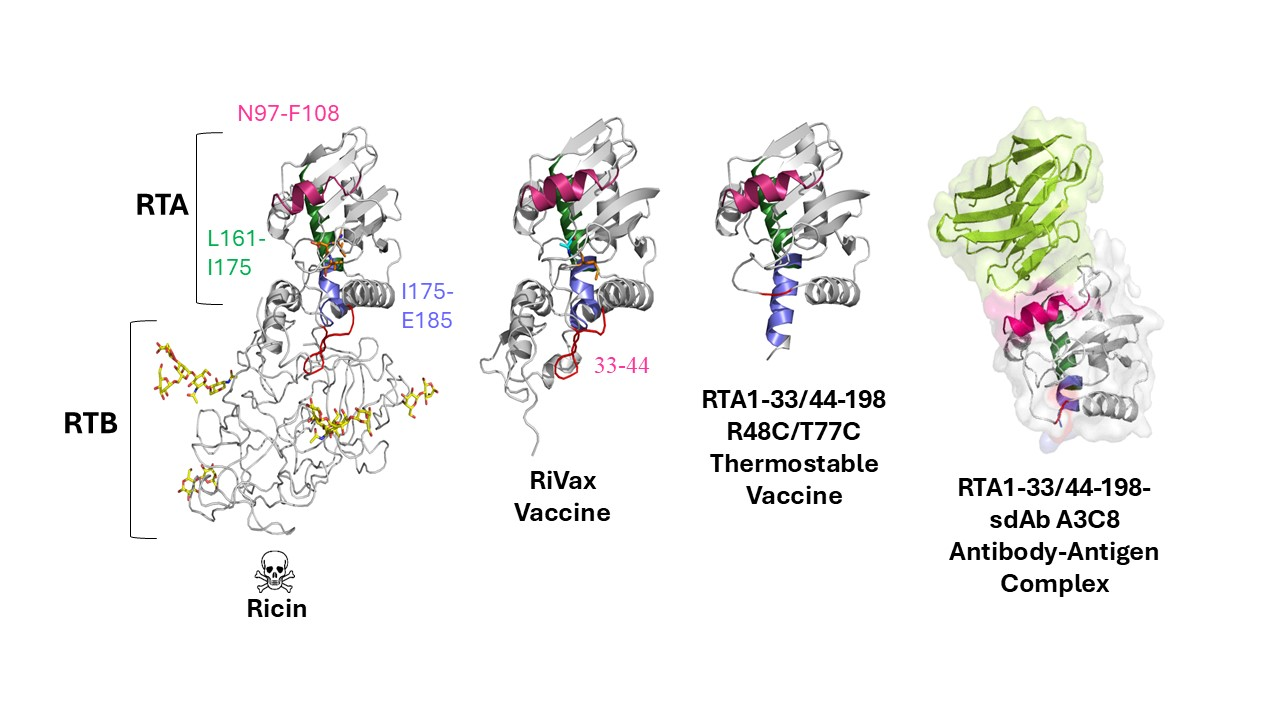
Ricin toxin, RiVax, RTA1-33/44-198, and a single domain antibody-antigen complex with the RTA1-33/44-198 immunogen. Original figure can be found in Legler, et al.

Ricin toxin vaccines have emerged as a focus in biodefense research. Two recombinant A subunit (RTA)-based vaccines, RiVax and RVEc (also known as RTA1-33/44-198), have completed Phase I clinical trials, and were found to be safe. These vaccines are based on modified versions of the ricin toxin A-chain, designed to reduce toxicity while maintaining immunogenicity.

A biopharmaceutical company called Soligenix, Inc. licensed an anti-ricin vaccine called RiVax from Vitetta et al. at UT Southwestern. The vaccine was found safe and immunogenic in mice, rabbits, and humans. Two successful clinical trials were completed. Soligenix was issued a US patent for Rivax. The ricin vaccine candidate was granted orphan drug status in the US and the EEC and, as of 2019, was in clinical trials in the US. Grants from the National Institute of Allergy and Infectious Diseases and the US Food and Drug Administration supported development of the vaccine candidate.

== Synthesis ==
The first isolation of ricin is attributed to the Baltic-German microbiologist Peter Hermann Stillmark (1860–1923) in 1888.

== Terrorist use ==
Ricin has been involved in a number of actual or planned attacks on individuals. As of 2025, the only successful murder using ricin occurred in 1978. The Bulgarian dissident Georgi Markov was assassinated by Bulgarian secret police who surreptitiously shot him on a London street with what was later found to have been a modified umbrella using compressed gas to fire a tiny pellet containing ricin into his leg. He died in a hospital a few days later; his body was passed to a special poison branch of the British Ministry of Defence that discovered the pellet during an autopsy. The prime suspects were the Bulgarian secret police: Georgi Markov had defected from Bulgaria some years previously and had subsequently written books and made radio broadcasts that were highly critical of the Bulgarian communist regime. However, it was believed at the time that Bulgaria would not have been able to produce the pellet, and it was also believed that the KGB had supplied it. The KGB denied any involvement, although high-profile KGB defectors Oleg Kalugin and Oleg Gordievsky later claimed the KGB's involvement. Soviet dissident Aleksandr Solzhenitsyn developed (but survived) ricin-like symptoms after an encounter in 1971 with KGB agents.

Ten days before the attack on Georgi Markov another Bulgarian defector, Vladimir Kostov, survived a similar attack. Kostov was standing on an escalator of the Paris metro when he felt a sting in his lower back above the belt of his trousers. He developed a fever, but recovered. After Markov's death the wound on Kostov's back was examined and a ricin-laced pellet identical to the one used against Markov was removed.

Several terrorist individuals and groups have experimented with ricin or planned to use it. There have been incidents of the poison being mailed to US politicians. For example, on 29 May 2013 two anonymous letters sent to New York City Mayor Michael Bloomberg contained traces of it. Another was sent to the offices of Mayors Against Illegal Guns in Washington, D.C. A letter containing ricin was also reported to have been sent to American President Barack Obama at the same time. Shannon Richardson, an actress, was later charged with the crime, and pleaded guilty that December; she was sentenced to 18 years in prison plus a restitution fine of US$367,000. On 2 October 2018, two letters suspected of containing ricin were sent to The Pentagon, one addressed to Secretary of Defense James Mattis, and the other to Chief of Naval Operations, Admiral John Richardson. A letter was received on 23 July 2019 at Pelican Bay State Prison in California which claimed to contain a suspicious substance. Authorities later confirmed it contained ricin; no detrimental exposures were identified.

In 2020, some media in the Czech Republic reported, based on intelligence information, that a person carrying a Russian diplomatic passport and ricin had arrived in Prague with the intention of assassinating three politicians. Russian president Vladimir Putin denied the reports. The targets were said to have been Zdeněk Hřib, the mayor of Prague (capital of the Czech Republic), who was involved in renaming a square in Prague, "Pod Kaštany", where the Russian embassy is situated, to the Square of Boris Nemtsov, an opposition politician assassinated in the Kremlin in 2015; Ondřej Kolář, the mayor of Prague 6 municipal district, who was involved in removing the controversial statue to the Soviet-era Marshal Konev; and Pavel Novotný, the mayor of Prague's southwestern Řeporyje district. They all received police protection. Czech president Miloš Zeman later described the police protection of Zdeněk Hřib as an attempt by an insignificant politician to gain attention. Zeman also confused ricin with non-poisonous laxative castor oil.

In 2018 and 2023 German police thwarted attempted ricin attacks, after tip-offs believed to have come from the US FBI.

In 2025, security agencies in the Indian state of Gujarat arrested three Muslim men allegedly plotting a terrorist attack using ricin.

== In popular culture ==
Ricin has been used as a plot device, such as in the television series Breaking Bad.

The popularity of Breaking Bad inspired several real-life criminal cases involving ricin or similar substances. Kuntal Patel from London attempted to poison her mother with abrin after the latter interfered with her marriage plans. Daniel Milzman, a 19-year-old former Georgetown University student, was charged with manufacturing ricin in his dorm room, as well as the intent of "[using] the ricin on another undergraduate student with whom he had a relationship". Mohammed Ali from Liverpool, England, was convicted after attempting to purchase 500 mg of ricin over the dark web from an undercover FBI agent. He was sentenced on 18 September 2015 to eight years imprisonment.

In Agatha Christie's 1929 short story The House of Lurking Death, ricin is used as a plot device.

== See also ==
- List of poisonous plants
