= Era (publisher) =

ERA is a Bulgarian publishing house founded in 1996, with 100% private capital. It publishes mainly translated works in various genres of fiction and non-fiction. The list includes such well-known authors as Agatha Christie, Nicolas Sparks, Jeffery Deaver, Roberto Saviano and many more talented writers from around the world.
