= The Executioner (Kisyov novel) =

2003 novel by Stefan Kisyov

- Author: Stefan Kisyov
- Language: Bulgarian
- Genre: Crime
- Publication place: Bulgaria
- English publication date: 2003

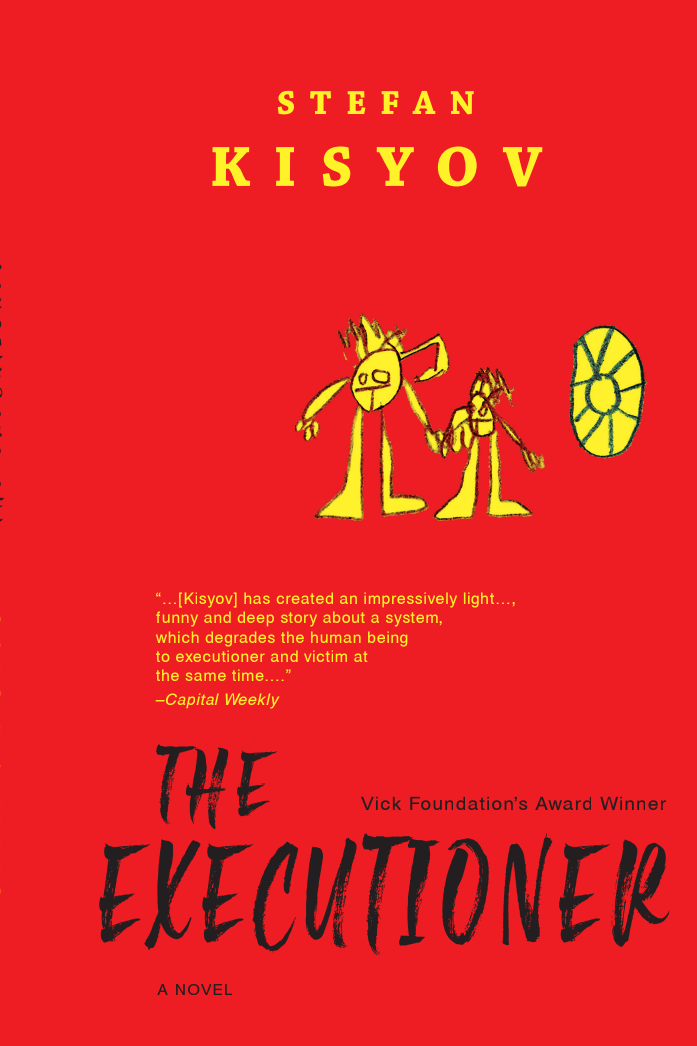
The Executioner

The Executioner is a post modern novel by Bulgarian novelist Stefan Kisyov, about the killing of Bulgarian dissident writer Georgi Markov. It was published in 2003 and is the winner of the Vick Foundation's "Best Novel of 2004".

== Style ==
The style of the book is written part fictionally, part phantasmagorically and uses existing facts, regardless of whether they are political, public or artistic by nature. It relies on vivid details, good dialogue, and on the effect of expectations going wrong, with a mixture of rough naturalism and ironical and metaphysical generalizations. The novel is written in the form of a confession, the confession of an executioner turned into a victim, and a victim, turned into an executioner.

== Editions ==
- Stefan Kisjov, Kat, Překl. Naďa Aljanabiová, Brno, Barrister & Principal, 2012.
- Stefan Kissiov, Ekzekutor, Prevela sa bugarskog Asja Tihinova-Jovanović, Podgorica, Oktoih, 2012, 91 pages.

== See also ==
- Bulgarian literature
