= Bulgarian–Ottoman wars =

1345 – July 1393 conflict between the Second Bulgarian Empire and the Ottoman Empire

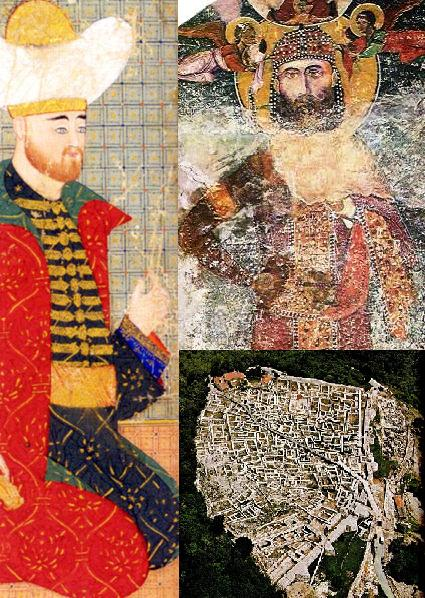
- Clockwise from right: Emperor Ivan Alexander, the remains of the Shumen fortress, Sultan Bayezid I
| Date | 1345 – 1396 AD (51 years) |
| Location | Balkans |
| Result | Ottoman victory |
| Territorial changes | Full Ottoman domination over Bulgarian lands after 1418 |

Belligerents
| (Second Bulgarian Empire) Bulgarian Empire; Tsardom of Vidin; Despotate of Dobruja; Despotate of Lovech | Ottoman Empire |

Commanders and leaders
| Ivan Alexander; Michael Asen IV of Bulgaria †; Ivan Asen IV †; Ivan Asen V †; Ivan Shishman (executed); Ivan Sratsimir (POW); Dobrotitsa; Fruzhin; Constantine II of Bulgaria | Murad I Bayezid I Lala Şahin Pasha; Çandarli Ali Pasha; Sarǎ Baba †; Mehmed Çelebi; Musa Çelebi |

The Bulgarian–Ottoman wars were fought between the kingdoms remaining from the disintegrating Second Bulgarian Empire, and the Ottoman Empire, in the second half of the 14th century. The wars resulted in the collapse and subordination of the Bulgarian Empire, and effectively came to an end with the Ottoman conquest of Tarnovo in July 1393, although other Bulgarian states held out slightly longer, such as the Tsardom of Vidin until 1396 and the Despotate of Dobruja until 1411. As a result of the wars the Ottoman Empire greatly expanded its territory on the Balkan peninsula, stretching from the Danube to the Aegean Sea.

== Situation in the Balkans on the eve of the Ottoman invasion ==
From the 13th century, the two main Balkan powers Byzantium and Bulgaria fell victims to a process of decentralization, as local feudal lords grew stronger and more independent from the emperors in Constantinople and Tarnovo. This weakened the military and economic power of the central rulers. The process deteriorated central authority to an even larger extent in the 14th century, when numerous nobles came to be only nominally subordinated to the government. In Bulgaria the powerful House of Shishman ruled over the Vidin Province in the west, while in the east Balik established a quasi-independent Despotate of Dobruja.

While the two Empires were facing enormous internal difficulties, the Serbs took the favorable opportunity to expand its domain. During the civil war in Byzantium in 1320s and 1330s, the Serbs conquered most of the Bulgarian and Aromanian populated Macedonia from the Byzantines. In 1330 Serbian forces defeated Bulgarian ones, led by Emperor Michail Shishman at Velbazhd effectively raising the country to the status of the most powerful state in the region. In 1346, Serbian king Stefan Uroš IV Dušan received the title of Emperor with the blessing of the Bulgarian Emperor Ivan Alexander, although after his death in 1355, the large Serbian Empire disintegrated into a few independent states. In Bulgaria of the same period Ivan Sratsimir inherited Vidin from his father Ivan Alexander in 1356, while despot Dobrotitsa – nominally his subject – ruled Dobruja. Lack of stability was eminent in the southern Balkans as well: in 1341–1347 the Byzantine Empire was shaken by a bloody civil war between John V Palaiologos and John VI Kantakouzenos.

Circa mid 14th century the Balkans were politically disunited into a number of small states frequently in competition with each other and there was no single strong entity with a powerful enough army to withstand the Muslim invaders. In addition to the mainly Orthodox countries such as Bulgaria, Byzantium and Serbia, there were a number of Catholic possessions to the west and south held by Venice, Genoa and the Kingdom of Hungary as well as Kingdom of Bosnia whose Bosnian Church (traditionally considered closely related to the Bogomils) was considered heretic by both Orthodox and Catholics. Religious dissimilarity was thus also a source for constant political tensions in the region.

== Military actions during the reign of Ivan Alexander ==
=== Conflicts with the Aydinids ===
During the civil war in Byzantium both Palaiologos and Kantakouzenos were trying to find external allies and used foreign mercenaries. The Bulgarian Emperor supported the first opponent whose stronghold was Constantinople. John Kantakouzenos on the other hand regularly hired Ottoman Turk mercenaries from Asia Minor who soon became a fixture on the battlefields in Thrace. The Byzantines often lost control over the Ottomans then as the latter regularly plundered villages in the Southern Balkans after the 1320s.

In 1344, Momchil, the independent Bulgarian ruler of the Rhodope and Aegean regions, whose army grew to 2,000 men, took an important role in the Byzantine civil war. While at first he supported John Kantakouzenos, from the spring of 1344 Momchil reneged, provoked by the aggression of the Ottoman allies. In June, he defeated the Aydinid fleet near Portogalos Bay. According to sources, at night the Bulgarian ruler sent boats to burn the anchored Aydinid ships and soon after he defeated the army of Kantakouzenos at Mosynopolis.

Probably the first local ruler to become aware of the impending threat of Turks, Momchil unsuccessfully pleaded with the emperors of Bulgaria and Byzantium for help. Even though his troops continued the resistance in the Eastern Rhodopes, in May 1345 the Turks led by Umur Beg marched from Asia Minor and devastated Bulgarian territories driving away people and livestock. Soon after, on 7 July 1345, Aydinid forces under Umur Beg defeated Momchil's army in the Battle of Peritor near his capital Xanthi. Sources attest that the independent ruler perished in the battle without leaving a successor, and with little political will or leadership left to counter the Ottoman invasion.

=== First clashes with the Ottomans ===
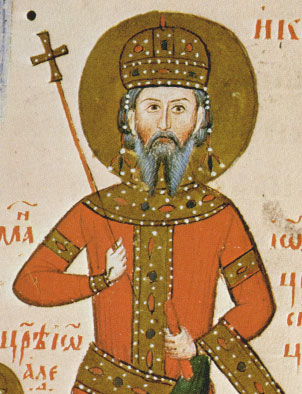
Emperor Ivan Alexander

During the Byzantine civil wars Ivan Alexander regained control over several towns in Thrace and the Rhodopes but his frequent interference in the internal affairs of Byzantium hampered any closer relations between the two countries despite the peace established in 1332. In 1352 Turkish forces invaded Bulgaria anew, raiding Thrace, particularly the vicinities of Aitos, Yambol, and Plovdiv, and capturing rich spoils. In the same year the Ottomans seized their first fortress on the Balkans, Tsimpe on the Gallipoli peninsula, setting firm foot in Europe. Until 1354 Ottoman forces again ravaged the lands around Yambol and Plovdiv as well as the lower valleys of the Maritsa and Tundzha rivers.

In 1355 the Ottomans launched a campaign towards Sofia, but were soon engaged by the army of Ivan Alexander's eldest son and heir Michael Asen close to Ihtiman. In the following battle both sides suffered heavy casualties and, despite the death of young Michael Asen, the Turks were unable to reach Sofia.

=== Unsuccessful alliance ===
The defeat raised serious alert not only in Tarnovo, but also in Constantinople, forcing John Kantakouzenos to abdicate and removing one of the main facilitators of the Ottoman invasion. Faced with threat, Bulgaria and Byzantium made an attempt for rapprochement. In 1355 a daughter of the Bulgarian Emperor, Keratsa, married Andronikos, the infant son of the new Byzantine Emperor John V Palaiologos. Unfortunately, the new relations between the houses of Tarnovo and Constantinople did not live up to the expectations of mounting a more significant response to the invading Ottomans.

After the death of Stefan Dušan on 20 December 1355, the Serbian Empire lost much of its hegemony in the Western Balkans and the large and ethnically diverse empire split into several successor states. The Bulgarian and Byzantine Empires of the period were once again the only remaining major political powers on the peninsula with the potential to stop the Ottoman expansion. Between 1354 and 1364 the Turks conquered Thrace as a number of important fortresses and towns, such as Plovdiv and Stara Zagora fell under attack. From the end of the 1350s Ottoman military units even reached the surroundings of the capital as, according to sources, the Emperor took precautions to strengthen the city walls. Ottoman chronicler Hoca Sadeddin Efendi suggests that Turkish advance between 1359 and 1364 involved destruction and depopulation of many areas: the towns Plovdiv, Stara Zagora, and Sliven were devastated, and others such as Venets and Sotirgrad were completely destroyed. Destruction was accompanied by slaughter and deportation of the local populace to Asia Minor.

Not only was there a total lack of coordination between the two Empires, but they also quarreled over the Black Sea ports of Mesembria and Anchialos. Bulgaria successfully defended them in 1364, but the continuing conflict deepened the distrust and animosity between the two states despite the impending danger.

=== Last years of Ivan Alexander ===
Apart from the economic devastation and military threat from the south, Bulgaria had other problems: in 1365 the Hungarian King Louis I invaded northwestern Bulgaria, seizing the important Vidin fortress and capturing the eldest living son of the tsar, Ivan Sratsimir. In his unsuccessful initial attempts to retake Vidin, Ivan Alexander even resorted to using Ottoman mercenaries. Eventually, in the summer of 1369, the Bulgarian Emperor restored his authority over the Vidin Province with the help of the Wallachian voivode Vladislav I, but that proved to be his last success.

After Ivan Alexander's death on 17 February 1371, the lands populated by Bulgarians were divided into several independent states. Much of the former territory of the Second Bulgarian Empire came under the rule of the tsar's third son Ivan Shishman; the northwestern areas were the dominance of the eldest son Ivan Sratsimir, despot Dobrotitsa held Dobruja, and most of Macedonia was divided into several feudal states controlled by Serbian nobles.

== Battle of Chernomen and its consequences ==
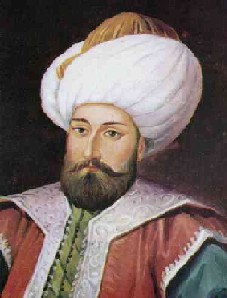
Sultan Murad I

In 1371 two feudal lords in Macedonia organised a campaign against the Turks. Serbian brothers Vukashin and Uglesha, respectively the king of Prilep and the despot of Ser, gathered a numerous Christian army aiming to stop the Muslim invaders. Uglesha, whose lands bordered Ottoman territory to the east, realized the threat and unsuccessfully appealed to Serbian and Bulgarian states for help. Ruling over a mixed Serbian-Greek-Bulgarian population, the two brothers set off to the east with a 20,000 to 70,000 strong ethnically diverse army. Considerably less numerous troops led by Lala Şahin Pasha attacked the united Balkan forces at night on 26 September as the latter camped by the village of Chernomen in the lower Maritsa valley. The entire army was pushed back and Vukashin and Uglesha perished along with much of their forces.

Immediately after the battle, the armies of Murad I embarked on another campaign overrunning Northern Thrace and forcing young Ivan Shishman to pull back north of the Balkan Mountains. A number of fortresses fell, though after prolonged and fierce sieges: the town of Diampol, for instance, fought against the forces of Timurtash for months but was eventually forced to surrender because of food shortage. One of Ivan Shishman's voivodes, Shishkin, was killed in battle on the southern skirts of the Balkan Mountains further easing the Ottoman conquest of the Rhodopes, Kostenets, Ihtiman, and Samokov. After a bloody siege they captured Bitola in the southwest and soon encroached on the Sofia Valley. In the bloody clash both sides suffered heavy casualties, but the Ottomans were repulsed and were forced to retreat. In 1373 Ivan Shishman was forced to negotiate a humiliating peace treaty: he became an Ottoman vassal, strengthening the union with a marriage between Murad and Shishman's sister, Kera Tamara. To compensate, the Ottomans returned some of the conquered lands, including Ihtiman and Samokov.

Between 1371 and 1373 the Ottomans emerged as a considerable power in the Balkans. They ruled over all Thrace and had seized the lands of Uglesha in Eastern Macedonia and managed to subordinate Vukashin's son Marko and Ivan Shishman, who both became their vassals.

=== Fall of the Rhodopes ===
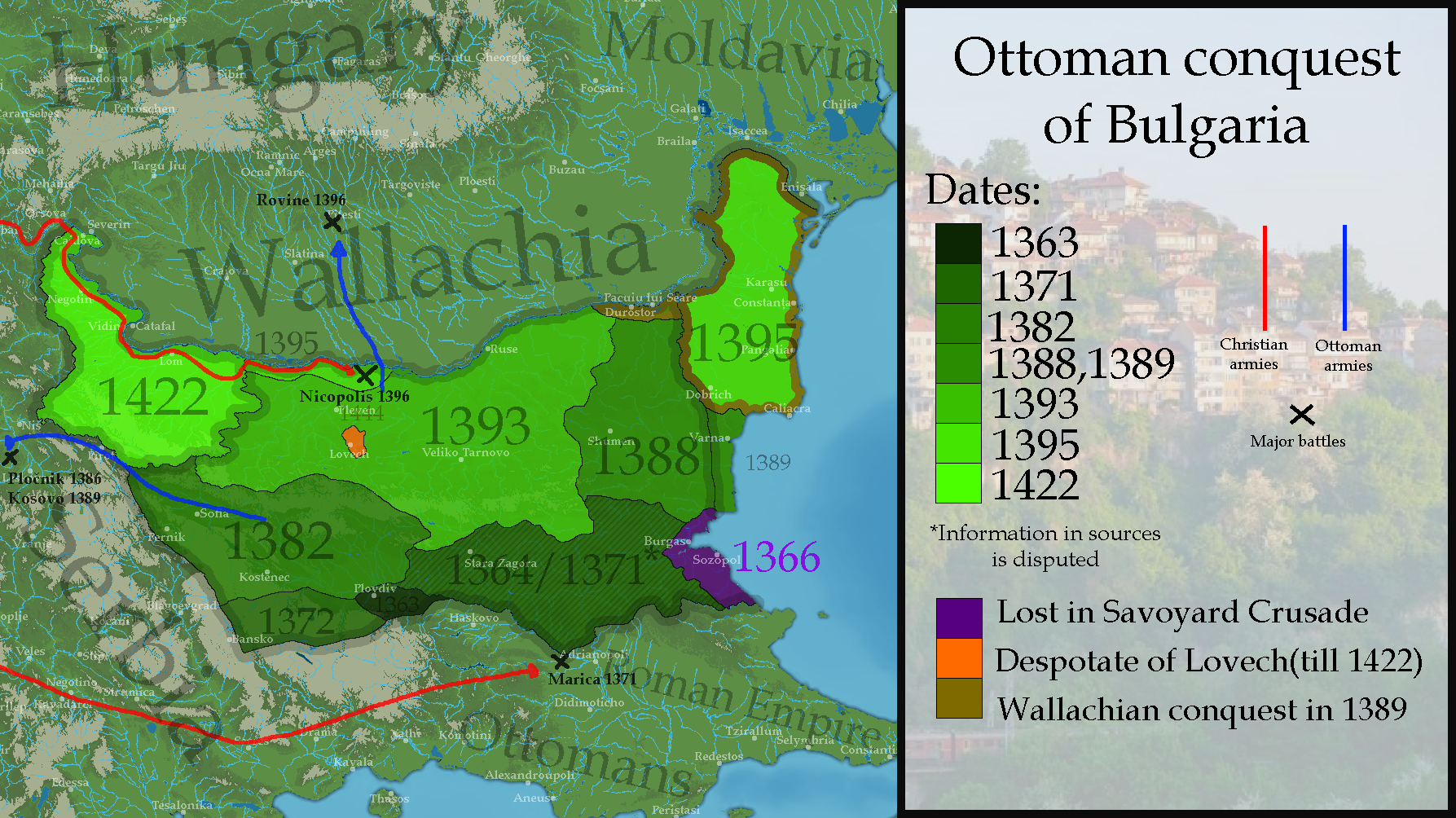
Ottoman conquest of Bulgaria in late 14th century.

During the same period (1371–1373) the invaders took control of the Rhodopes, a mountain studded with strong and well-guarded fortresses, approaching from the north. The Rakovitsa fortress (now in ruins) was besieged by Daud Pasha and fiercely defended by its voivoda Kurt; after futile attempts to capture it with force, the Turks agreed to negotiations and the Bulgarians surrendered keeping their property.

Similarly, the population of Tsepina, one of the strategic fortresses of the Rhodopes, resisted Ottoman attacks for nine months before surrendering in return for their lives and property after Daud Pasha cut off the water supplies. In the same way Stanimaka (Asenovgrad) was taken and soon after fell the northern Rhodopes fortress of Batkun whose commander Georgi died in the final assault.

The Ottomans faced a stubborn resistance in the Rhodopes interior: central areas were invaded by the armies of Dzhedit Pasha and Ibrahim Pasha. The former advanced through the road between Stanimaka and Bachkovo Monastery along the valley of Chepelarska river, while Ibrahim pasha set off from Plovdiv via Parvenets and then through the valley of Vacha River. Fighting occurred at Zarenitsa, Zagrad, Gradishte, Chiltepe and Karakulas (along Vacha), Imaretdere and Momina Voda (heights close to Ardino) among others.

== Fall of Sofia ==
While Ivan Shishman was desperately trying to resist against the strong Ottoman pressure, his brother Ivan Sratsimir not only withheld help but tried to make use of the difficulties which his brother faced to expand his domains over certain areas of the Tarnovo Tsardom. As Shishman's attention was pointed to the south, Ivan Sratsimir took control of the important city of Sofia which was disputed between the two brothers. However, by 1373 the city was again in the Tarnovo Tsardom and it is possible that there was an armed conflict between the two Bulgarian states. Despot Dobrotitsa also did not give any support to the Emperor in Tarnovo. He was in conflict with Genova and was involved in the internal affairs of the Empire of Trebizond trying to put on its throne his son-in-law.

After the temporary quiet which followed after 1373, in 1380 the Ottomans again started hostilities. With a large army Sultan Murad moved towards the southwestern regions of the Tarnovo Tsardom with the main objective to seize its center Sofia. After a bloody clash in the Zlatitsa valley the Turks moved on to Sofia and besieged it. The city which was commanded by ban Yanuka repulsed all the attacks of the superior Ottoman forces under Lala Şahin. The later could not continue the siege and was forced to pull back to Odrin where he reported his failure to the Sultan. While he was absent the Turks managed to infiltrate Sofia and one Muslim Bulgarian captured ban Yanuke while hunting and sent him to Lala Şahin who was in Plovdiv at that time. From there the Bulgarian commander was sent back to Sofia and when the defenders saw their captured leader they surrendered the city to the Ottomans (1382).

The Ottomans installed a strong garrison and brought Muslim settlers from Asia Minor. On the following year fell Serres The new Ottoman success did not bring together Ivan Shishman and Ivan Sratsimir. Between 1384 and 1386 a war broke out between Bulgaria and Wallachia and the Vlachs seized several settlements along the Danube but their voivoda Dan I was killed by Mircea the Elder making peace between the two countries and the war was indecisive.Ivan Sratsimir took part in the action as an ally of the Vlachs which deepened the mistrust between the two brothers.

After the Ottomans secured the possession of the area around Sofia, they continued their march to the northwest. The main objective of Murad was to break the ties between Bulgaria and Serbia because despite the fact that Ivan Shishman was his vassal, Murad did not trust him and knew that the Bulgarian ruler was waiting for an appropriate opportunity to renege. After bitter fighting, in 1386 the Turks seized Pirot and Naissus, killing and enslaving many Bulgarians.

== Campaign of 1388 ==
The advance of the Ottomans in the central parts of the Balkan peninsula caused serious anxiety not only for Ivan Shishman but also in Serbia and Bosnia. The Serbian Prince Lazar and the Bosnian King Tvrtko I organized an anti-Ottoman coalition and the Bulgarian Emperor joined them but was unable to send troops. In 1387 the united forces of Bosnians and Serbs defeated the Ottomans in the Battle of Pločnik.

However, while the Christian states did not make any attempt to exploit the victory, the Turks' reaction was swift. In 1388 a 30,000 strong army commanded by Ali Pasha passed through the eastern Balkan Mountains and struck deep into Bulgaria's north. The Bulgarians were completely surprised and the invaders seized Ovech, Shumen, Madara and other towns. Due to the surprise campaign at first the towns and the castles were unable to organize proper defence but after the initial shock the Bulgarians took precautions. When the army of Ali Pasha besieged Varna, the defenders stiffly resisted and the Turks were forced to abandon the siege and march northwards.

In Tutrakan the citizens allowed the Turks to install a small garrison but then they killed the Turkish soldiers and prepared for siege. Ali Pasha immediately burned the surrounding fields and soon the starving town had to surrender. After this success they advanced to the west towards Nicopolis, one of the strongest Bulgarian fortresses along the Danube. The defence was organized by Ivan Shishman who was currently in the town. Although the Ottomans had nearly 30,000 men they could not take it and Ali Pasha had to seek reinforcements from Murad himself. According to Seadeddin the Sultan marched to Nikopol with an enormous army firmly decided to seize the town at all costs. When Ivan Shishman faced the new enemy he sought a truce. Murad agreed and the Bulgarians saved Nikopol but were forced to cede another key Danubian fortress, Dorostolon. However, when Ali Pasha reached Silistra, the Bulgarians refused to surrender the town. Murad besieged Nikopol for a second time and this time Ivan Shishman agreed to the Ottoman conditions and a Turkish garrison was installed in Silistra.

As a result of the campaign the Turks took most of eastern Bulgaria including several key towns. Now the authority of Ivan Shishman was reduced to the lands to the west of the capital Tarnovo and several castles along the Danube. To the east the Bulgarians kept Varna and the capital of the Principality of Karvuna, Kaliakra. Probably at that time Ivan Sratsimir became an Ottoman vassal.

== List of battles ==
=== Bulgarian–Ottoman battles ===
| Battle | Date | Bulgarian Commander | Ottoman Commander | Result |
|---|---|---|---|---|
| Battle of Ihtiman | 1355 | Michael Asen | Unknown | Indecisive |
| Siege of Plovdiv and Stara Zagora | 1369 | Unknown | Unknown | Ottoman victory |
| Battle of Samokov | 1371 | Ivan Shishman | Lala Şahin | Ottoman victory |
| Battle of Sofia valley | 1372 | Unknown | Lala Şahin | Ottoman retreat |
| Siege of Sofia | 1380 | Ban Yanuka | Lala Şahin | Bulgarian victory |
| Second siege of Sofia | 1382 | Ban Yanuka | Lala Şahin | Ottoman victory |
| Siege of Varna | 1388 | Ivanko | Çandarli Ali Pasha | Bulgarian victory |
| First siege of Tutrakan | 1388 | Unknown | Çandarli Ali Pasha | Bulgarian victory |
| Siege of Nicopolis | 1388 | Ivan Shishman | Çandarli Ali Pasha | Bulgarian victory |
| Campaign of 1388 | 1388 | Ivan Shishman | Çandarli Ali Pasha | Ottoman victory |
| Second siege of Tutrakan | 1392 | Unknown | Çandarli Ali Pasha | Ottoman victory |
| Shishman's campaign | 1392 | Ivan Shishman | Unknown | Bulgarian victory |
| Siege of Tarnovo | 1393 | Evtimiy | Bayezid I | Ottoman victory |
| Battle of Nicopolis | 1396 | Ivan Sratsimir | Bayezid I | Ottoman victory |
