= Battle of Sırpsındığı =

1364 battle from the Serbian–Ottoman Wars

- Part of the Serbian–Ottoman wars
| Date | 1364 |
| Location | Maritsa River, Sarayakpınar village near Adrianople |
| Result | Ottoman victory: Adrianople becomes capital of Ottoman state |

Belligerents
| Serbian Empire (Second Bulgarian Empire) Bulgarian Empire; Principality of Wallachia | Ottoman Empire |

Commanders and leaders
| (Serbian Empire) Vukašin Mrnjavčević (Serbian Empire) Uglješa Mrnjavčević (Second Bulgarian Empire) Ivan Alexander | (Ottoman Empire) Hacı İlbey |

Strength
| Unknown | 5,000–10,000 |

Casualties and losses
| Unknown | Unknown |

Sırpsındığı was, according to Ottoman sources, a sudden night raid by an Ottoman force led by Hacı İlbey on a Serbian contingent at the banks of the Maritsa river about 15 kilometres from the city of Adrianople. It occurred in 1364 between an expeditionary force of the Ottomans and a Serbian army that also included crusaders sent by the Pope. The Ottomans destroyed the Serbian army, which is why the battle was known as "sırp sındığı" (destruction of Serbs). The battle was the first attempt to throw the Ottomans from the Balkans with an allied army. There is no record of this battle in any Serbian, Hungarian, papal, or other European sources.

== Definition of "Sırpsındığı" ==
In Ottoman Turkish Sırp means "Serbian" and Sındık means "destruction", hence sırpsındığı means "destruction of Serbs" or 'Rout of the Serbs' that symbolises the casualties of Serbian soldiers in this battle.

== Prelude ==
When the Ottomans captured Adrianople in 1362, a strategic main road from Constantinople to Europe was cut. A large number of nomadic Turkoman immigrants began to settle in Thrace very quickly. The Ottomans also attacked Serbian, Bulgarian and Byzantine lands. The enlargement policy of the Ottomans caused fear and counter reactions of the other nations in the Balkans. When the Ottomans captured Plovdiv in 1363, the Byzantine garrison commander in Plovdiv fled to Serbia. He constantly advised and encouraged the Serbians and Bulgarians to attack the outnumbered Ottoman forces quickly with an allied force before the Ottomans fortified their positions. The Serbians and Bulgarians therefore agreed to send an allied force to push the Ottomans from the Balkans. With the encouragement and efforts of Pope Urban V, the Principality of Wallachia and the Ban of Bosnia agreed to send some troops to support that allied force. The Kingdom of Hungary, which was also fighting for leadership in the Balkans, supported that army by sending troops.

== Battle ==
A crusading army consisting of 30,000–60,000 troops began to move on Adrianople; at that time the Ottoman sultan Murad I was fighting the Catalan mercenaries in the Byzantine army at Biga, (Çanakkale). Most of the Ottoman army was in Asia Minor. Lala Sahin Pasha who was the first Beylerbey of Rumelia, demanded Sultan to send him some reinforcements. Lala Şahin Paşa appointed “Hacı İlbey” to be the commander of an expeditionary force that was supposed to monitor and slow down the allied army.

Despite all efforts, the allied army crossed the Maritsa river very easily without any important resistance and made a camp in Sarayakpinar (old name: Sirpsindiği) village in Edirne near the banks of the Maritsa river. They were very near to Adrianople. The army leaders made an early feast that night. They hoped to take Adrianople with ease. They neglected to take any measures that might protect the camp, but the camp was being monitored by expeditionary forces. Hacı Ilbey decided to make a surprise attack without waiting for any reinforcements. Ottoman akinjis attacked the allied camp in the darkness of night, and they each carried two torches for the purpose of deceiving the enemy into thinking that they had double their actual numbers. The trick worked, and this surprise attack threw the allied army into a panic given that they were drunk or asleep because of the feast. They supposed that the Ottoman Sultan Murad I had arrived there with a large army. Most of the allied troops tried to retreat back to the road where they came from, though many of them drowned in the Maritsa river while trying to swim to the opposite side. A majority of the soldiers were Serbians.

== Aftermath ==
Despite his victory, Hacı İlbey lived only one year after that battle for in 1365 he was poisoned by Lala Sahin Pasha who was jealous of his victory. Adrianople became a capital of the Ottomans. The Bulgarians agreed to pay tribute to the Ottomans and this battle hastened the fall of Bulgaria because the Ottomans started to occupy upper Bulgaria. The high number of Serbian casualties in this battle was one of the main reasons for the Battle of Maritsa, a battle where the Serbs and their allies would attempt to avenge the loss for this battle.

== Confusion and disambiguation ==
- According to some sources, this battle and the Battle of Maritsa (Battle of Chernomen) were one and the same battle.
- According to Turkish sources, Sirpsindiği and the Battle of Maritsa were two separate battles, and that the Serbian loss in Sırpsındığı was one of the main reasons for the Battle of Maritsa, where the Serbs avenged the earlier battle. The Battle of Maritsa occurred at Ormenio (tr. Çirmen) in Greece, while this battle occurred at Sarayakpınar village in Turkey; two different places that are both located at the banks of the Maritsa river. Because of this situation, some sources use the terms "First Battle (of Maritsa)" for Sırp Sındığı and "Second Battle (of Maritsa)" for the one at Ormenio. The commanders of these two battles were different; the Ottoman forces in the Battle of Maritsa were led by Lala Şahin Paşa, while Sırp Sındığı was led by Hacı Ilbey, who had in fact been killed by Lala Şahin Paşa in 1365.
- According to some other sources, there were two big battles in 1364 and 1371, but that the "Sırp Sındigi" (destruction of Serbs) was the Battle of Maritsa (at Ormenio), while the battle in 1364 might have been called by a different name.

At the instigation of Pope Urban V, a crusading army of Hungarians, Serbians, Bosnians and Wallachians was formed and in 1364 it set forth to recapture Adrianople. It marched undisturbed to the Maritsa, but there it was surprised by a night attack and cut to pieces. ...Nevertheless the Serbs resolved to stop Turks in the valley of the Maritsa and marched as far as "Chernomen" between Philippolis and Adrianople. There at dawn on September 26, 1371, a greatly inferior Turkish force surprised them and slaughtered large numbers...

There is no single record of this battle in Serbian and Hungarian sources. All information about the battle of 1364 is based on Ottoman sources. Some of that information collides with the medieval history of Hungary, Bosnia, Wallachia, and Serbia. According to European sources, King Louis I of Hungary was in the war against ban Tvrtko I of Bosnia and Bosnian heretics in 1363. The army under Louis's personal command besieged Sokolac in Bosnia in July 1363. According to Ottoman sources, both of them participated in the battle of 1364. It is accepted that Vukašin of Serbia became a co-ruler of Serbia and king in August or September 1365. According to Ottoman sources, he is a king and the leader of Christian forces, even though they claim that the king of Hungary participated in the battle. Louis signed a treaty with Emperor Charles and Rudolf IV of Austria in Brno in early 1364, which ended their conflicts. Around September 22–27, 1364, Louis participated in the Congress of Krakow, where the European monarch discussed possible crusade against Turks.
