= Siege of Sofia =

Ottoman siege of Sofia during 1380-1382

Coordinates: 42°42′N 23°20′E

- Part of the Bulgarian–Ottoman wars
Date	1380–1382
Location	Sofia, Bulgaria
Result	• Bulgarian victory – 1st siege; • Ottoman victory – 2nd siege

Belligerents
(Second Bulgarian Empire) Bulgarian Empire	Ottoman Empire

Commanders and leaders
(Second Bulgarian Empire) Yanuka †	(Ottoman Empire) Shahin Pasha (Ottoman Empire) Ballaban Bey

Strength
Unknown	Unknown

Casualties and losses
Unknown	Unknown

The Siege of Sofia refers to the two sieges of the city that took place in between 1380–1382 during the course of the Bulgarian–Ottoman wars.The Bulgarian defenders,led by Yanuka,repulsed the Ottomans–led by Lala Shahin Pasha– in the first siege.However,the Ottomans would besiege the city again with Ballaban Bey leading them with Lala Shahin Pasha.The Ottomans killed Yanuka and forced the Bulgarians to surrender,thus winning control of the city

In 1373 the Bulgarian emperor Ivan Shishman agreed to become an Ottoman vassal and to marry his sister Kera Tamara to their sultan Murad I, while the Ottomans were to return some conquered fortresses.

== First siege ==
Despite the peace, in the beginning of the 1380s the Ottomans resumed their campaigns and besieged the important city of Sofia which controlled major communication routes to Serbia and Macedonia. There are little records about the siege. After the futile attempts to storm the city, the Ottoman commander Lala Shahin Pasha considered to abandon the siege. All attacks led by the Ottomans were repelled by Yanuka.

== Second siege ==
In 1382 a Bulgarian renegade called Usunca Syondök managed to lure the city governor ban Yanuka out of the fortress to hunt and the Turks, led by Ince Balaban bey, captured him. Leaderless, the Bulgarians surrendered. The city walls were destroyed and an Ottoman garrison was installed. With the way to the north-west cleared, the Ottomans pressed further and captured Pirot and Niš in 1386, thus wedging between Bulgaria and Serbia.

After the capture of the city, Sofia became a sanjak. Ince Balaban who has also been referred to as 'the conqueror of Sofia', became its first sanjakbey.

== Sources ==
- Андреев (Andreev), Йордан (Jordan); Милчо Лалков (Milcho Lalkov) (1996). Българските ханове и царе (The Bulgarian Khans and Tsars) (in Bulgarian). Велико Търново (Veliko Tarnovo): Абагар (Abagar). ISBN 954-427-216-X.
