= Pločnik, Prokuplje =

Pločnik Плочник
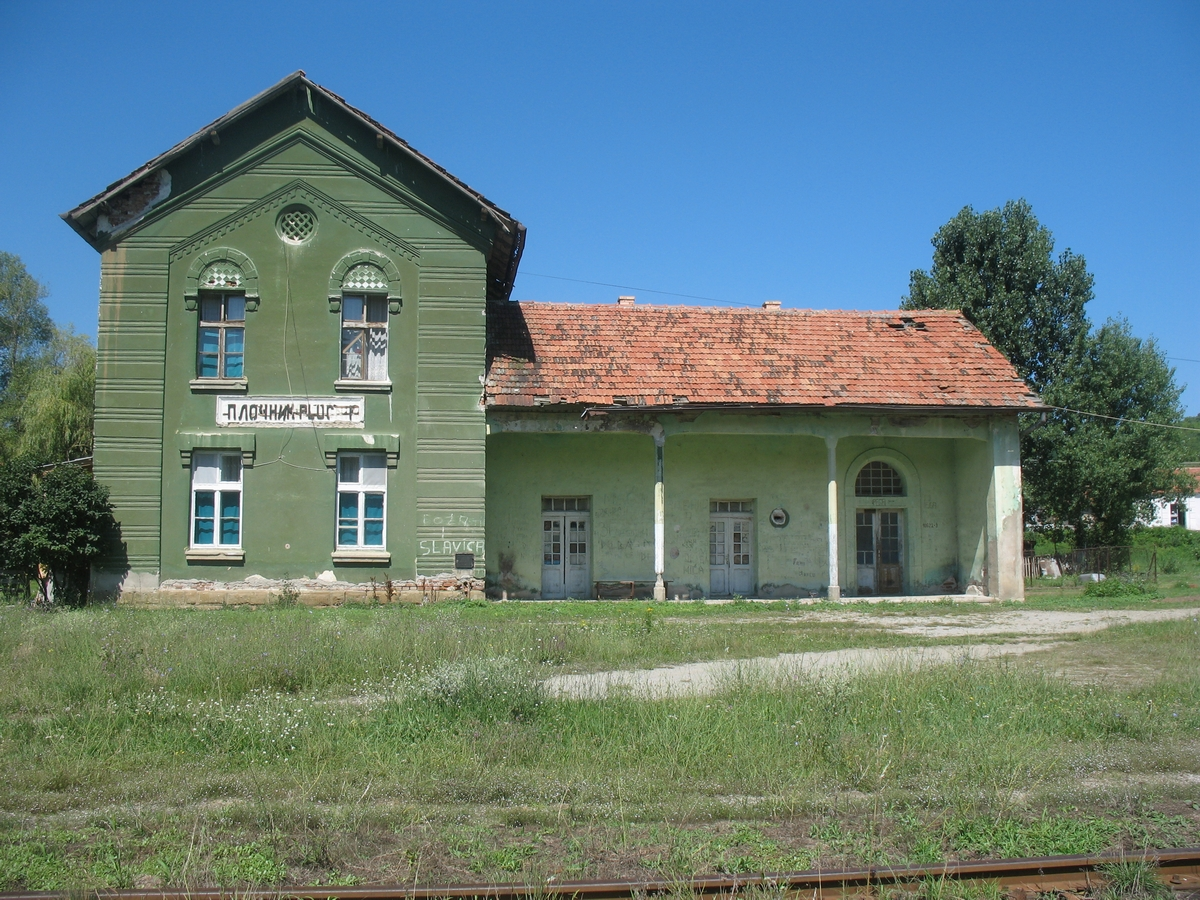
- Pločnik train station

- Location of Pločnik
- Coordinates: 43°12′12″N 21°21′33″E
- Country: Serbia
- Municipality (Општина): Prokuplje
- Elevation: 420 m (1,380 ft)

Population (2002)
  - Total: 182
- Time zone: UTC+2 (EET)
  - Summer (DST): UTC+3 (EEST)
- Area code: 027
- License plate: PK

Pločnik (Serbian: Плочник) is a village in the municipality of Prokuplje, Toplica District, Republic of Serbia. According to the 2002 population census, it is populated by 182 people, all of whom are declared Serbs.

== History ==
=== Chalcolithic copper smelting ===
In 2007, an important European-archaeology excavation site was found in Pločnik. At this site, and in Belovode, archaeologists have found the earliest current evidence of copper smelting, dating from between 5500 BCE and 5000 BCE. This shows that the Copper Age started 500 years earlier than previously thought, and probably somewhere near this region.

=== Dog domestication ===
In November 2020 it was announced that the bones of the 6500 old female dog found at the site in Pločnik by the University College London and the local Museum of Toplica crew show proof of Middle Eastern domestication, as one of the five branches of ancient canine-wolf common species that, along with the Siberian branches, gave rise to the modern dog.

=== Medieval Ottoman invasion ===
It was the site of the historically notable 1386 Battle of Pločnik. Ottoman Sultan Murad I led a sizable Turkish army in an invasion of Serbia. Serbian Prince Lazar Hrebeljanović led the Serbian army to intercept him. The Ottoman army suffered a defeat. However, though beaten, the Turkish forces were still strong enough to conquer Niš from the Prince on their return.
