= Battle of Bileća =

1388 battle in the Balkans

- Part of the Bosnian–Ottoman Wars
Date	c. 26 August 1388
Location	around Bileća (present day Bosnia and Herzegovina) 42.866667°N 18.433333°E
Result	Bosnian victory

Belligerents
Kingdom of Bosnia	Ottoman Empire supported by: Principality of Zeta

Commanders and leaders
(Kingdom of Bosnia) Vlatko Vuković (Kingdom of Bosnia) Radič Sanković	(Ottoman Empire) Shahin Pasha

Strength
c. 7,000	c. 18,000 in total

Casualties and losses
Light	Heavy
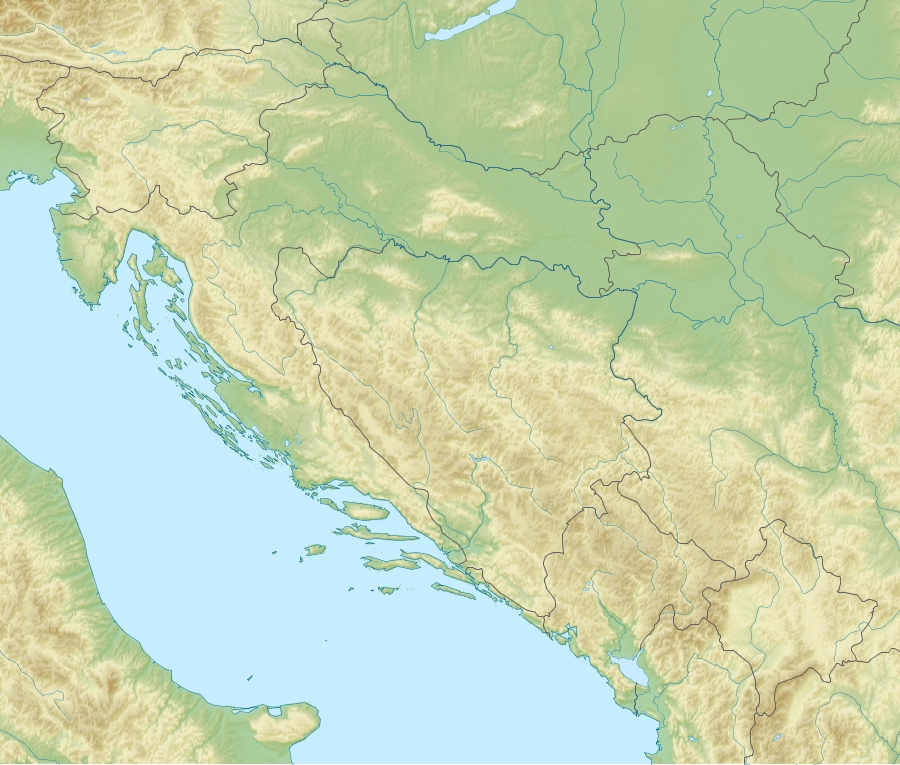
- Location within Bosnia and Herzegovina Battle of Bileća (Dinaric Alps)

The Battle of Bileća was fought in August 1388 between the forces of the Kingdom of Bosnia, led by Grand Duke Vlatko Vuković, and the Ottoman Empire under the leadership of Lala Shahin Pasha. The Ottoman army broke into Hum, the kingdom's southern region. After days of looting, the invaders clashed with the defending force near the town of Bileća, north-east of Dubrovnik. The battle ended with an Ottoman defeat.

== Background ==
The Ottoman Turks, based in Thrace, appeared as a considerable military and political factor for the western Balkans in the 1380s. Having turned rulers of various countries in Macedonia into their vassals, the Ottomans under Murad I started launching raids to the west, towards the Adriatic coast. They eagerly assisted feudal lords in the Balkans in their wars among themselves, increasing and exploiting discord and purposely weakening Balkan states. The Kingdom of Bosnia was thought far enough to be safe from an Ottoman incursion and in the east it was shielded by a belt of independent states that rose after the fall of the Serbian Empire.

The distance between Bosnia and Ottoman Thrace proved no barrier, however. The hostility between King Tvrtko I of Bosnia and Đurađ II Balšić, ruler of Zeta (one of the Serbian statelets) and vassal of Murad, led to clashes between Bosnians and Turks earlier than would have been expected. The first Ottoman incursion into Bosnia, about which little is known, took place in October 1386. It was likely suggested and enabled by Đurađ, and caused panic in the neighbouring Republic of Ragusa. In 1388 Đurađ contacted the Ottoman commander Lala Shahin Pasha, then waging war in Epirus, hoping to slight Tvrtko.

== Ottoman attack ==
The threat of an Ottoman attack on Bosnia appeared in early August 1388. The Ottoman ruler Murad I had dispatched Lala Shahin Pasha to assist Đurađ. Ragusan authorities sent an emissary to Đurađ concerning Turks who had broken into Hum, in the south of Tvrtko's realm and very close to the Ragusa itself. On 15 August, the Ragusans decided to provide refuge in their state for Tvrtko's subjects who were fleeing the advancing invaders, allowing the noblemen and the common people to take shelter in the city of Dubrovnik and the Pelješac peninsula around the city of Ston respectively. The walls of Ston were prepared for defense; on 19 August all the inhabitants were tasked with defending the peninsula, and the following day Tvrtko too sent 1,000 men to help the defenders. An emissary was also sent that day to Lala Şahin Pasha, who was already nearby. The Ragusans were intent on securing themselves in face of the imminent clash, and the emissary sent to the Ottoman commander was probably meant to both negotiate and provide intelligence. On 22 August advice was sought from the Hungarian court as well.

The size of the army dispatched by Murad against Tvrtko is not known, but it must have been considerable since it included his own sons. It was certainly not a vast, conquering one, but neither was it a small and merely looting band. Its goal was to bring plunder as well as to showcase Murad's military might.

King Tvrtko's army, led by his most capable and trusted general, Grand Duke of Bosnia Vlatko Vuković, allowed the Turks to penetrate as far as the town of Bileća. The Bosnians engaged the invaders using Hum's rugged topography, characterized with many steep, rocky slopes and deep gorges and decisively defeated them. Lala Shahin Pasha barely escaped with his life; few of his men were as lucky. The precise date is disputed; according to a later chronicle of the events, the battle took place on 27 August. Already on 26 August, however, Ragusans informed King Sigismund of Hungary of the outcome and decided to release the captured Zetans and Albanians, who had been in the Ottoman army.

== Aftermath ==
The Ottoman attack and defeat made both Tvrtko and Đurađ more willing to come to terms with each other. The Bosnian victory did not overshadow the effects of Ottoman plundering. While future incursions remained a possibility, the Bosnians did not face the Ottoman army again for almost a year following the victory in Bileća. In June 1389, however, Murad himself marched westwards, perhaps intending to eventually strike against Tvrtko. Murad might have also suspected that Lazar, ruler of Moravian Serbia, contributed to the defeat near Bileća. This forced Bosnians and Serbians to band together against his army at the Battle of Kosovo.

== See also ==
- Battle of Pločnik
