= Battle of Samokov =

Military battle

- Part of the Bulgarian–Ottoman wars and the Serbian–Ottoman wars
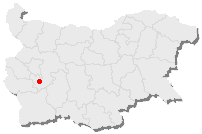
Date	1371
Location	Samokov, Bulgaria
Result	Ottoman victory

Belligerents
(Second Bulgarian Empire) Bulgarian Empire; Serbian Empire	Ottoman Empire

Commanders and leaders
(Second Bulgarian Empire) Ivan Shishman (Serbian Empire) Uglješa Mrnjavčević	(Ottoman Empire) Shahin Pasha

Strength
Large	Fewer

Casualties and losses
Unknown	Unknown

The Battle of Samokov took place between the Ottoman army under the command of Lala Shahin Pasha, the Second Bulgarian Empire under the command of Ivan Shishman, and the Serbian Empire under the command of Uglješa Mrnjavčević. Ottoman Turks headed to the city of Samokov after the conquest of Ihtiman. They encountered the armies of the Serbian and Bulgarian kings. Although the Serbian and Bulgarian armies were far superior to him in numbers, Lala Shahin Pasha did not hesitate to fight and achieved victory with a strong attack. The victory was so complete that the soldiers of the Serbian and Bulgarian armies fled without taking any of their provisions, leaving everything behind.

== Battle ==
Having concluded his campaign in the Balkans, Sultan Murad I, upon crossing into Anatolia, entrusted Lala Shahin Pasha with the conquest of Samokov and Ihtiman, leaving him on the European front. Lala Shahin then set out for these regions with a large force. Upon arriving at Kapulu-derbend, he found the pass blocked. He forced the pass open, arrested some of those guarding it, executed others, and subsequently captured the city of Ihtiman. The people were spared because they had accepted Ottoman protection. From there, he advanced to Samokov. At Çamurluova, he encountered the armies of the Serbian and Bulgarian kings. Although the Serbian and Bulgarian armies were numerically superior, Lala Shahin Pasha did not shy away from battle and, with a powerful attack, routed the enemy forces and achieved victory. Following this success, Pasha marched to Samokov and captured it. After taking the necessary measures to protect the region and ensuring order, Lala Shahin Pasha returned to Plovdiv, his encampment. Here he used the goods and spent the money on the training and arming of the soldiers.

== Aftermath ==
With the conquest of Samakov, important iron mines came under Ottoman rule, and with the capture of Ihtiman, the road to Sofia was opened for the Ottomans. Lala Şahin’s subsequent raids took place in this direction. One of the most important results of this battle was the surrender of Prince Konstantin Dejanović of Kyustendil without a fight.
