= Battle of Maritsa =

14th-century battle of the Serbian–Ottoman Wars

Coordinates: 41°43′N 26°13′E

- Part of the Serbian–Ottoman wars
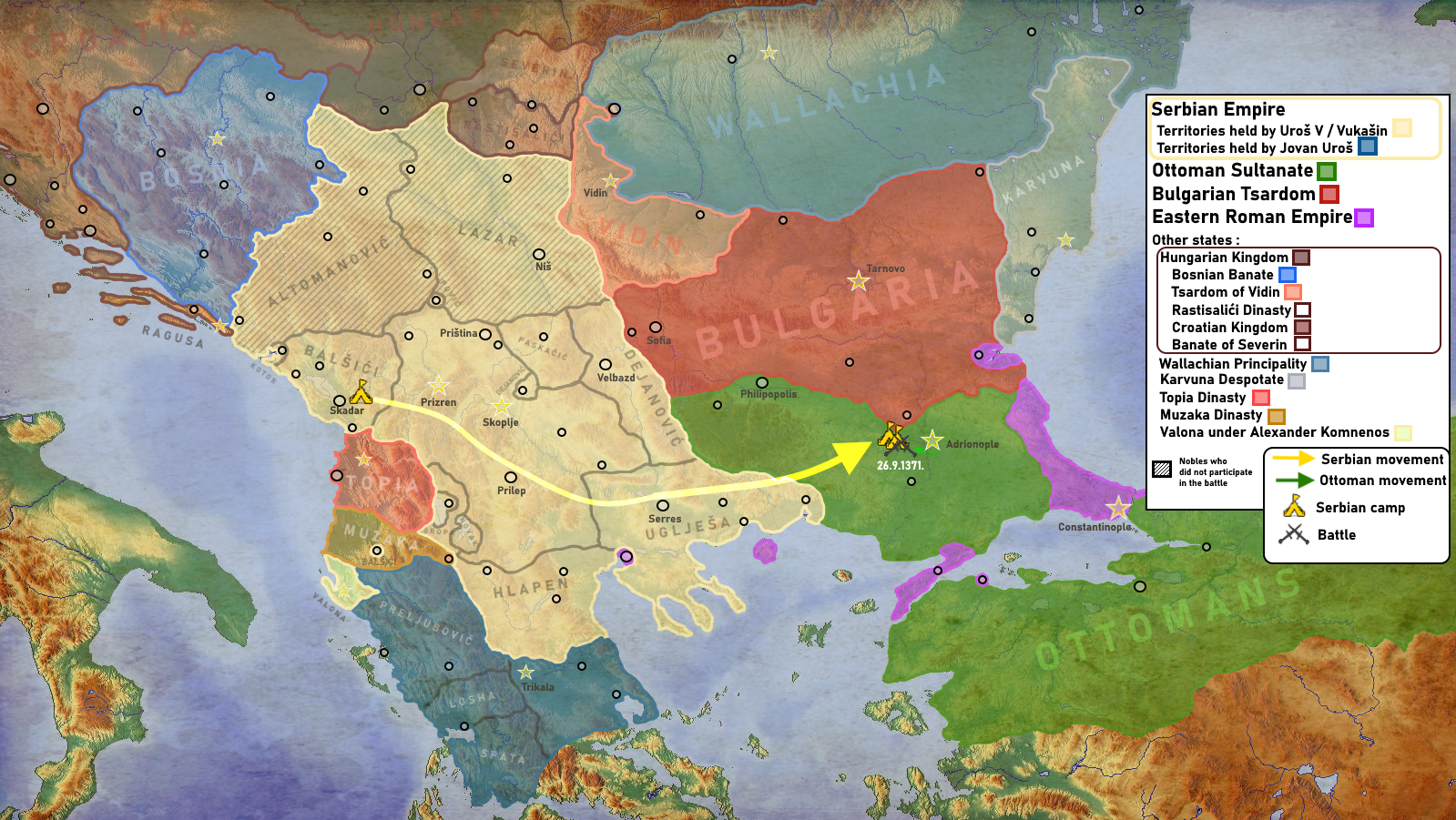
- Map showing Serbian and Ottoman movements and allied territories prior to the Battle of Maritsa.
Date	26 September 1371
Location	Maritsa River (near Chernomen; present-day Ormenio, Greece)
Result	Ottoman victory

Belligerents
Serbian Empire	Ottoman Empire

Commanders and leaders
(Serbian Empire) Vukašin Mrnjavčević † (Serbian Empire) Uglješa Mrnjavčević †	(Ottoman Empire) Shahin Pasha (Ottoman Empire) Hacı İlbey

Strength
See § Strength and composition	See § Strength and composition

Casualties and losses
Extremely heavy	Unknown

The Battle of Maritsa, also known as the Battle of Chernomen (Serbian: Marička bitka / Маричка битка; Turkish: Çirmen Muharebesi, İkinci Meriç Muharebesi; "Second Battle of Maritsa" (Note: In later Turkish historiography the engagement was sometimes associated with the Sırp Sındığı Zaferi ("Rout of the Serbs"), an earlier battle in 1364 near Adrianople (modern Edirne). Modern historians such as Y. Hakan Erdem note that the two events, often referred to as the First and Second Battles of Maritsa, were later conflated in Ottoman chronicles.)), was fought on 26 September 1371 near the Maritsa River, close to the village of Chernomen (present-day Ormenio, Greece). The conflict pitted the Ottoman forces under Lala Şahin Pasha and Hacı İlbey against a coalition of Serbian lords, led by King Vukašin Mrnjavčević and his brother Despot Jovan Uglješa who sought to halt the Ottomans' westward advance. The battle ended in a decisive Ottoman victory in which both Serbian commanders were killed, marking the decline of Serbian power in Macedonia and paving the way for Ottoman expansion into the central Balkans.

== Background ==
The Battle of Maritsa took place during the formative phase of the Ottoman Empire's expansion into the Balkans. In 1354, the Ottomans crossed into Europe and seized Gallipoli. From there, they advanced through Thrace, capturing Demotika, Philippopolis, and finally Adrianople by 1369. From the Ottoman perspective, these campaigns were regarded as part of a holy war for the spread of Islam and were accompanied by the settlement of Turkish nomads and the creation of frontier provinces under commanders such as Lala Şahin Pasha. By 1370, most of Thrace, stretching from the Rhodope to the Balkan Mountains, was under Ottoman control, bringing them into direct contact with the lands of the Serbian lords.

The Serbian Empire had entered a period of decline following the death of Emperor Stefan Dušan in 1355. His successor, Stefan Uroš V, was unable to maintain central authority, and the empire fragmented as its vassals asserted independence. Recognising the growing Turkish threat, Despot Uglješa, the Serbian ruler of Serres, sought to form a coalition to drive them out of Europe, but his efforts to secure Byzantine and Bulgarian support failed. (Note: According to historian Caroline Finkel, some Bulgarian rulers fought alongside the Serbs and became Ottoman vassals after the battle.) Most other Serbian nobles were preoccupied with internal rivalries, and only his brother Vukašin joined him.

== Prelude ==
In the summer of 1371, Vukašin marched to the Principality of Zeta to support his relative Đurađ Balšić in a conflict with Nikola Altomanović. His army was in Skadar (modern Shkodër) preparing for action when Uglješa summoned him. Believing Ottoman control in the region was weak while Murad I was in Asia Minor, Uglješa saw an opportunity to launch a surprise attack on the Ottoman capital, Adrianople (modern Edirne). Vukašin left Skadar to join him, and the combined Serbian forces advanced east across the Thracian plain, meeting the Ottoman army near the Maritsa River at Chernomen (modern Ormenio). The Ottoman force was not a centrally led imperial army, as Sultan Murad was campaigning elsewhere, but a mixed provincial contingent under the command of Lala Şahin Pasha and Hacı İlbey.

== Strength and composition ==
Estimates of the armies' sizes vary widely and are regarded as unreliable, as no contemporary source provides dependable figures for the battle. The 14th-century Serbian Monk Isaiah claimed 60,000 Serbs, a figure generally treated by modern historians as rhetorical exaggeration. In the 15th century, the Byzantine scholar Laonikos Chalkokondyles wrote of 800 Ottomans under a commander named "Süleyman", an anachronism likely derived from later Ottoman narrative traditions. Later Ottoman chroniclers similarly offered highly asymmetrical figures, often claiming 60,000 Serbian troops against 4,000 Ottomans.

According to medieval historian Clifford J. Rogers in The Oxford Encyclopedia of Medieval Warfare and Military History, the Ottoman army is described as numbering between 800 and 4,000 men; this figure refers to a detachment that attacked the Christian camp rather than the total size of the Ottoman force. Rogers also describes the Christian army as including Serbs, Greeks and contingents from Dalmatia, Bosnia, Hungary and Wallachia, although its composition remains uncertain and such labels may not correspond to modern concepts of ethnicity.

John Fine argues that while the Christian coalition was probably large by contemporary standards, it was "nowhere near" Isaiah's total. Aleksandar Shopov regards medieval numerical claims as exaggerated, observing that in the late 14th century even armies of a few thousand men were considered large and that the forces at Maritsa most probably did not exceed ten thousand soldiers.

== Battle ==
The battle took place near the Maritsa River, about 20 miles west of Adrianople. Ottoman ghazi warriors attacked the Serbian camp at night while most of the soldiers were asleep. The army was massacred along with its commanders. (Note: Later traditions occasionally credited the Ottoman command to Evrenos Bey but this is not supported by contemporary sources.) The engagement resulted in the annihilation of the Serbian forces, described by Fine as a crushing defeat attributed in later accounts to the Serbs being caught unprepared.

Donald Nicol characterises the engagement as a catastrophic blow for the Serbs and for the whole cause of eastern Christendom, citing Konstantin Jireček, who wrote that both princes perished and that their men were slaughtered "in such numbers that the river ran red with their blood." Alexander Mikaberidze similarly concludes that, despite the Serbs' attempted surprise attack, superior Ottoman tactics produced a decisive victory. Turkish historian and Ottomanist Abdülkadir Özcan notes that Ottoman accounts claiming that Şahin Paşa and Hacı İlbey defeated the Christian army by a sudden raid are questionable. Nicol also argues that "it is hard to maintain that this was a victory for the Ottomans", even though it proved disastrous for the Serbs.

== Aftermath ==
The Battle of Maritsa marked a significant stage in the Ottoman expansion across the Balkans. With the forces of King Vukašin and Despot Uglješa defeated and both leaders killed, Ottoman troops advanced into Macedonia and parts of central Serbia. According to historian Ion Grumeza, the Serbian Empire lost a large proportion of its ruling aristocracy as a result of the battle. In the aftermath, several regional lords, including Vukašin's son Prince Marko, became Ottoman vassals, obliged to provide tribute and military service. Ottoman expansion continued into Macedonia, Bulgaria and Greece, where some rulers also accepted vassalage.

The defeat deepened the political fragmentation of the Serbian lands. Emperor Uroš V died childless later that year, ending the Nemanjić line, while nobles such as Prince Lazar, the Balšići and the Brankovići established their own principalities. Thessaly, Albania and Epirus had entirely seceded from Serbia. Nikola Altomanović established an independent realm in Rudnik and the lands formerly held by his uncle, Vojislav.

Over the following decades, fragmented resistance continued among regional rulers, culminating in Prince Lazar's stand against the Ottomans at the Battle of Kosovo in 1389.

== Sources ==
- Ćirković, Sima M. (2008-04-15). The Serbs. John Wiley & Sons. ISBN 978-1-4051-4291-5.
- Erdem, Y. Hakan (2008). Tarih-Lenk: kusursuz yazarlar, kâğıttan metinler (in Turkish). Doğan Kitap. ISBN 978-605-111-062-2.
- Fine, John Van Antwerp (1994). The Late Medieval Balkans: A Critical Survey from the Late Twelfth Century to the Ottoman Conquest. University of Michigan Press. ISBN 978-0-472-08260-5.
- Finkel, Caroline (2006-02-13). Osman's Dream: The History of the Ottoman Empire. Basic Books. ISBN 978-0-465-02396-7.
- Grumeza, Ion (2010-08-04). The Roots of Balkanization: Eastern Europe C.E. 500-1500. Bloomsbury Publishing PLC. ISBN 978-0-7618-5134-9.
- İnalcık, Halil (1978). The Ottoman Empire: The Classical Age 1300-1600. Transl. by Norman Itzkowitz and Colin Imber. Praeger.
- Mikaberidze, Alexander (2011-07-22). Conflict and Conquest in the Islamic World: 2 volumes [2 volumes]. Bloomsbury Publishing USA. ISBN 978-1-59884-337-8.
- Nicol, Donald M. (1993-10-14). The Last Centuries of Byzantium, 1261-1453. Cambridge University Press. ISBN 978-0-521-43991-6.
- Özcan, Abdülkadir (2003). "Lala Şâhin Paşa". TDV İslâm Ansiklopedisi (in Turkish). Türkiye Diyanet Vakfı.
- Rogers, Clifford J. (2010). The Oxford Encyclopedia of Medieval Warfare and Military Technology. Oxford University Press. ISBN 978-0-19-533403-6.
- Rossos, Andrew (2013-09-01). Macedonia and the Macedonians: A History. Hoover Press. ISBN 978-0-8179-4883-2.
- Shopov, Aleksandar (2007). The Historical Visions of the Battle of the Maritsa / Meriç. History, Graduate School of Arts and Social Sciences (MA thesis). Thesis supervisor: Yusuf Hakan Erdem. Istanbul: Sabancı University.
- Turnbull, Stephen (2014-06-06). The Ottoman Empire 1326–1699. Bloomsbury Publishing. ISBN 978-1-4728-1026-7.
