= Battle of Pločnik =

1380s battle in the Balkans

Coordinates: 43°12′07″N 21°21′20″E

- Part of the Serbian–Ottoman wars
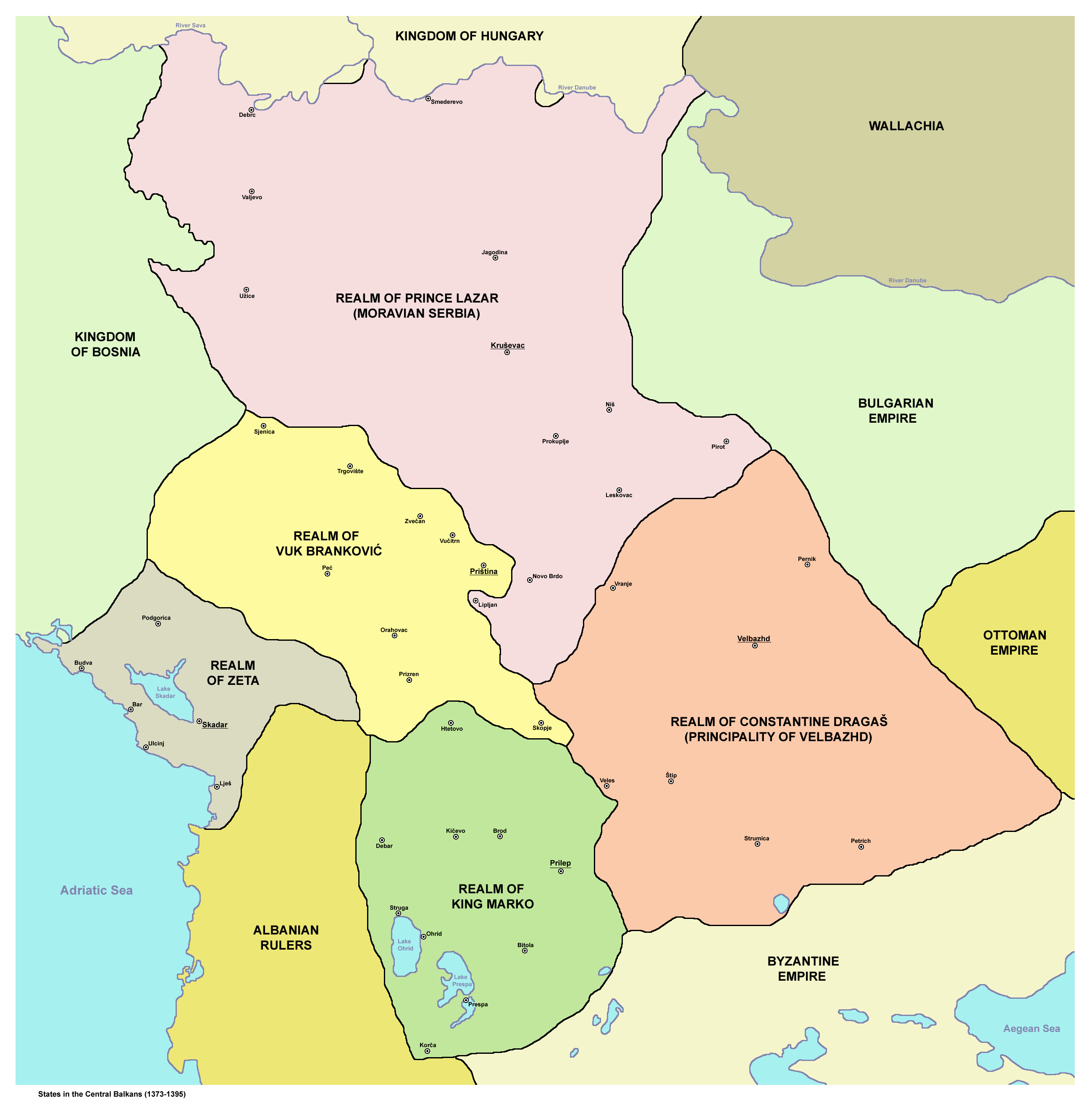
- Central Balkans in 1373–1395. The battle was fought near Prokuplje.
Date	Sometime between 1385 and 1387
Location	Pločnik (present-day Serbia)
Result	Serbian victory

Belligerents
Moravian Serbia supported by: Kingdom of Bosnia	Ottoman Empire

Commanders and leaders
Lazar Hrebeljanović; Miloš Obilić (WIA)	(Ottoman Empire) Murad I (Ottoman Empire) Shahin Pasha

Strength
c. 15,000	c. 20,000 in total

Casualties and losses
Light	c. 12,000–13,000 killed, wounded or captured

The Battle of Pločnik was fought sometime between 1385 and 1387 near the village of Pločnik (near Prokuplje in today's southeastern Serbia), between the forces of Serbian Prince Lazar Hrebeljanović, and the invading Ottoman Army of Sultan Murad I.

== Background ==
The Ottoman army penetrated Pomoravlje and neighbouring areas, killing and looting, then clashed with the subjects of Lazar at Dubravnica (1381), where they were successfully fought off. With a larger force, the Ottoman Sultan Murad I attacked Serbia in 1386, when according to some sources Niš was conquered.

Murad I had campaigned against the Karamanids and defeated their army near Konya in the Battle of Frenkyazısı (1387). Serbian soldiers from some vassal Serbian lords had accompanied the Ottoman army. Some of the soldiers (including some Serbian soldiers) were executed for looting civilian property against the Sultan's order. Many of the vassal Serbian lords now began to support Lazar against the Ottomans. At that time, one lord in Shkodër wrote to the Sultan promising to recognise Ottoman sovereignty and aid the Ottoman army if Ottoman troops were sent to protect him. Murad I consequently ordered an akinji commander, Kula Şahin Bey, to prepare his troops (according to Namık Kemal, this was not Lala Şahin Paşa, as is commonly believed).

== Battle ==
The Serbian army emerged victorious, although details of the actual battle are scarce. Şahin Bey entered Serbia with 20,000 akinjis, and learned that Serbian lords had prepared an army to attack his troops. He advanced to Pločnik near Prokuplje but could not detect that army, and believed that it did not exist. At that time, many akinjis (about 18,000) lost their temper and began looting civilian properties in the surrounding villages, disobeying orders, leaving Şahin Bey alone with 2,000 soldiers. The battlefield was observed by Serbian expeditionary forces.

Suddenly an allied army of 15,000 soldiers appeared, many of whom were cavalry. The Serbian army used heavy knight cavalry charges, with horse archers on the flanks. The Serbs first attacked the Ottoman center (2,000 soldiers). Although unprepared and suffering a shock from heavy Serbian knights, the outnumbered Ottoman center resisted for some time but later began to withdraw with Şahin Bey, who barely escaped with his life.

Then the Serbian army turned to the other 18,000 akinjis that were busy plundering. They were unprepared, ill-disciplined, and caught by surprise; only 5,000 of them returned home alive. More than 60% of the Ottoman army was destroyed. According to tradition Serbian knight and folk hero Miloš Obilić participated with distinction in this battle; he was wounded by an Ottoman arrow.

According to Croat historian Vjekoslav Klaić, Lazar's army was aided by Bosnian troops. According to another version of the battle, it was won thanks to the Bosnian troops and the trickery of a Kastrioti.

== Aftermath ==
The victory at Pločnik brought considerable prestige to Lazar among Serbian (and bordering) nobles, and provided (at least) nominal unity of the Serbian Principalities. It was the first major defeat of the Ottomans in South Slavic lands, though Lazar could not recapture Niš, which Ottomans had taken prior to Pločnik. The Ottoman army next campaigned against Bosnia, suffering another serious defeat to Vlatko Vuković and Radič Sanković at Bileća (1388), and culminating in Kosovo, fighting Serbian and allied troops at the Kosovo field (1389), concluding with the deaths of both Murad I and Lazar.

== See also ==
- History of the Serbian-Turkish wars

== Annotations ==
1. There are several estimations on the year of the battle. 1385 according to Sima Ćirković; 1386 according to Jovanka Kalić and Marko Šuica; 1387 according to Kemal Namık.

== Sources ==
- Ćirković, Sima M. (1990). Kosovska bitka u istoriografiji. Zmaj. p. 64.
- Dinić, Mihailo (1938). "Žan Froasar i boj na Pločniku". Прилози за књижевност, језик, историју и фолклор. XVIII (18) (3–4). Belgrade: 361–365.
- Duducu, Jem (2018). The Sultans: The Rise and Fall of the Ottoman Rulers and Their World. Amberley Publishing. ISBN 9781445668611.
- Đerić, Branislav (1989). Kosovska bitka: vojno-istorijska rasprava. Naučna knjiga. p. 25. ISBN 9788623020070.
- Kalić, Jovanka (1984). "Niš u srednjem veku". Историјски часопис. 31. Istorijski institut: 31–. GGKEY:5LA3DP5RFU7.
- Namık, Kemal (1982). Osmanlı tarihi: Anadolu Selçukluları ve Anadolu beylikleri hakkında bir mukaddime ile Osmanlı devleti'nin kuruluşundan İstanbul'un fethine kadarv̲̲. 2. İstanbul'un fethinden Kanunı̂ Sultan Süleyman'nın ölümüne kadar (in Turkish). Türk Tarih Kurumu. pp. 200, 219, 250.
- Novaković, Stojan (1878). Niš u prošlosti.
- Stojanović, Lj. (1927). Stari srpski rodoslovi i letopisi. pp. 113, 117, 121, 215, 287.
- Šuica, Marko (2006). "Pripovesti o srpsko-turskim okršajima i 'strah od Turaka' 1386. godine" [Stories of Serbian-Turkish conflicts between the Serbs and the Turks and the 'fear of the Turks' in 1386]. Istorijski časopis. 53: 99–108.
- Šuica, Marko (2011). O mogućoj ulozi Vuka Brankovića u Kosovskoj bici. Istorijski institut. pp. 234–. ISBN 978-86-7743-091-7.
