= Capture of Adrianople =

1360s capture of the Byzantine city of Adrianople by the Ottoman Empire

- Part of the Byzantine–Ottoman wars
Date	1360s
Location	Edirne, Turkey 41°40′37″N 26°33′20″E
Result	Ottoman victory
Territorial changes	Adrianople becomes the new capital of the Ottoman Empire

Belligerents
Byzantine Empire	Ottoman Empire

Commanders and leaders
Unknown	(Ottoman Empire) Shahin Pasha

The capture of Adrianople (or Edirne) by the Ottomans occurred sometime in the 1360s, and eventually became the Ottoman capital afterwards, until the Fall of Constantinople in 1453.

== Background ==
Following the capture of Gallipoli by the Ottomans in 1354, Turkish expansion in the southern Balkans was rapid. Although they had to halt their advance during the Kidnapping of Şehzade Halil between 1357–59, after Halil's rescue they resumed their advance. The main target of the advance was Adrianople, which was the third most important Byzantine city (after Constantinople and Thessalonica). Whether under Ottoman control or as independent ghazi or akinji warrior bands, the Turks seized Demotika (Didymoteicho) in 1360 or 1361 and Filibe (Philippopolis) in 1363. Despite the recovery of Gallipoli for Byzantium by the Savoyard Crusade in 1366, an increasing number of Turcoman warriors crossed over from Anatolia into Europe, gradually acquiring control of the plains of Thrace and pushing to the Rhodope Mountains in the west and the Bulgarian principalities in the north.

== Capture of Adrianople ==
The date of Adrianople's fall to the Turks has been disputed among scholars due to the differing accounts in the source material, with the years 1361 to 1362, 1367 and 1371 variously proposed. Following sources dating from long after the events, earlier scholarship generally placed the conquest between 1361 and 1363, in accordance with the report in Ottoman sources that a solar eclipse occurred in the year of Adrianople's fall. Thus later Turkish sources report that Lala Shahin Pasha defeated the Byzantine ruler (tekfur) of the city at a battle in Sazlıdere southeast of the city, forcing him to flee secretly by boat. The inhabitants, left to their fate, agreed to surrender the city, in July 1362, in exchange for a guarantee of freedom to continue to live in the city as before. However, most of the people, including the Metropolitan, were taken captive:

[...] most of its populace was taken away captive, especially the upper class with its own shepherd and teacher; the remainder [of the populace] has remained there without a leader until the present. Nor was that protector of the Church able to return to the Queen of Cities so that he even passed away there [in captivity].

Based on Elisabeth Zachariadou's examination of previously unregarded Byzantine sources, most modern scholars have moved to the view that the city was captured in 1369. Thus a poem from the city's Metropolitan bishop, to Emperor John V Palaiologos, shows Adrianople to have still been in Byzantine hands in Christmas 1366, while a series of Byzantine short chronicles place the date of its capture in 1369. In addition, some modern scholars opine that the capture of Adrianople may not have been carried out by Ottoman Turks, but by others among the many independently operating akinji groups in the region.

== Aftermath ==
The city was renamed to Edirne and continued for some time to be administered by Lala Shahin Pasha, while Sultan Murad I held court at the old capital at Bursa and only entered the city in the winter of 1376/7, when Emperor Andronikos IV Palaiologos ceded Gallipoli to Murad in exchange for his help in a dynastic civil war.

Edirne did not immediately become the Ottomans' capital; Murad's court continued to reside in Bursa and in nearby Demotika, as well as Edirne. Nevertheless, the city quickly became the main Ottoman military centre in the Balkans, and it was there that Süleyman Çelebi, one of the contenders for the Ottoman throne during the Ottoman Interregnum of 1402–13, moved the state treasury.

== Sources ==
- Fine, John V. A. (1994) [1987]. The Late Medieval Balkans: A Critical Survey from the Late Twelfth Century to the Ottoman Conquest. Ann Arbor, Michigan: University of Michigan Press. ISBN 978-0-472-10079-8.
- Gregory, Timothy E.; Ševčenko, Nancy Patterson (1991). "Adrianople". In Kazhdan, Alexander (ed.). The Oxford Dictionary of Byzantium. Oxford and New York: Oxford University Press. p. 23. ISBN 0-19-504652-8.
- Imber, Colin (2002). The Ottoman Empire, 1300–1650: The Structure of Power (First ed.). Basingstoke: Palgrave Macmillan. ISBN 978-0-3336-1386-3.
- İnalcık, Halil (1994). Kuruluş Dönemi Osmanlı Sultanları (in Turkish). İSAM. ISBN 978-605-5586-06-5.
- Tayyib Gökbilgin, M. (1965). "Edirne". In Lewis, B.; Pellat, Ch. & Schacht, J. (eds.). The Encyclopaedia of Islam, Second Edition. Volume II: C–G. Leiden: E. J. Brill. OCLC 495469475.
- Vogiatzis, Georgios (1987). Die Anfänge der Türkenherrschaft in Thrakien und die ersten Niederlassungen (Ph.D.) (in German). Vienna.
- Vryonis, Speros (1971). The Decline of Medieval Hellenism in Asia Minor and the Process of Islamization from the Eleventh through the Fifteenth Century. University of California Press. ISBN 0-520-01597-5.
- Zachariadou, Elizabeth (1970). "The Conquest of Adrianople by the Turks". Studii Veneziani. 12: 211–217.
