= Battle of Frenkyazısı (1387) =

- Part of the Ottoman wars in Asia
| Date | 1386 or 1387 |
| Location | near Konya |
| Result | Ottoman victory |

Belligerents
| Karamanids | Ottoman Empire |

Commanders and leaders
| Alâeddin Ali Bey | (Ottoman Empire) Murad I (Ottoman Empire) Şehzade Bayezid (Ottoman Empire) Şehzade Yakub (Ottoman Empire) Timurtaş Pasha |

The Battle of Frenkyazısı occurred in late 1386 or early 1387, between an Ottoman army under Murad I and a Karamanid force under Alaeddin Ali Bey. The engagement took place outside of Konya and resulted in a decisive Ottoman victory. In the aftermath the Karamanids had to accept Murad I's suzerainty and Ottoman supremacy over the western part of Anatolia was secured for the time being.
