= Battle of Ihtiman =

1355 battle of the Bulgarian–Ottoman wars

- Part of the Bulgarian–Ottoman wars
Date	1355
Location	Ihtiman, Bulgaria
Result	Indecisive (Note: Heavy losses stall Ottoman advance on Bulgarian capital of Sofia, however Ottomans are able to inflict a crushing blow on Bulgarian.)

Belligerents
(Second Bulgarian Empire) Bulgarian Empire	(Ottoman Empire) Ottoman Beylik

Commanders and leaders
(Second Bulgarian Empire) Michail Asen IV †	(Ottoman Empire) Süleyman Pasha

Strength
Unknown	Unknown

Casualties and losses
Heavy	Heavy

The Battle of Ihtiman occurred in 1355 between Bulgarians and Ottomans and resulted in a Bulgarian pyrrhic victory. The exact location is not known, but in an anonymous Bulgarian chronicle, it is mentioned that the armies of Michail Asen engaged the invading forces before they could reach Sofia.

When in 1355 the Ottoman Turks again penetrated the borders of Bulgaria, Prince Michael Asen set out against them. The sources speak of a twenty-thousand-strong Ottoman cavalry against which Michael opposed an unknown number of Bulgarian soldiers. Considering the plague epidemic, the first attack of which had already ravaged the country in the same year in which his brother died, Michael could hardly count on numerical superiority. However, the very fact that the new armed force was commanded by the crown prince of the Bulgarian kingdom means that it was not entrusted with random fighters, but experienced and well-equipped soldiers.

In all likelihood, the armies clashed again at Sofia, which from the Ottomans' point of view was the logical choice since they already knew the terrain. The anonymous Bulgarian chronicle tells us that "the Bulgarians gathered under the leadership of Michael, the son of Alexander, but he was also killed by the Agarians, who captured a large number of people and led them through Gallipoli." Although it undoubtedly reveals to us that Michael died in the battle with the Ottomans and the Bulgarian army was defeated, the anonymous chronicler misses a very important fact - Ottoman troops did not reappear on Bulgarian territory until around 1370. This allows Ivan Alexander to focus his attention on other potential threats to his country.

At Sofia, the Bulgarian heir to the throne died, but his self-sacrifice in the name of his compatriots was not entirely in vain - it took the Ottomans almost twenty years to decide again on a risky campaign against Bulgaria. Therefore, we should rather regard the loss as a pyrrhic victory - an obscure and stalemate in which both armies were severely bled.

== Background ==
After the Ottoman Turks seized their first fortress in the Balkans in 1352, they quickly began to expand their territory in Europe. From the year 1354, their raiding parties began looting in Bulgarian Thrace, ravaging the regions of Plovdiv and Stara Zagora, and in the following year launched a campaign against the key city of Sofia.

== Battle ==
The son of the Bulgarian Emperor Ivan Alexander, Michail Asen, summoned an army to stop the advancing enemy. The battle was fierce, the Bulgarians suffered heavy casualties and their commander and heir to the throne was killed. However, the Ottoman losses were also heavy and they were unable to continue their march on Sofia.

== Aftermath ==
The Ottoman forces suffered heavy losses in the battle and were unable to launch an offensive against Sofia. Secondly, since Prince Halil had been kidnapped by European pirates, Byzantium used the prince as blackmail against the Sultan. In order to prevent any attempt on his son's life, Sultan Orhan stopped the expeditions to Europe.
