= Tomb of Murad I =

Mausoleum in the Prishtina District, Kosovo

Coordinates: 42°42′07″N 21°06′15″E

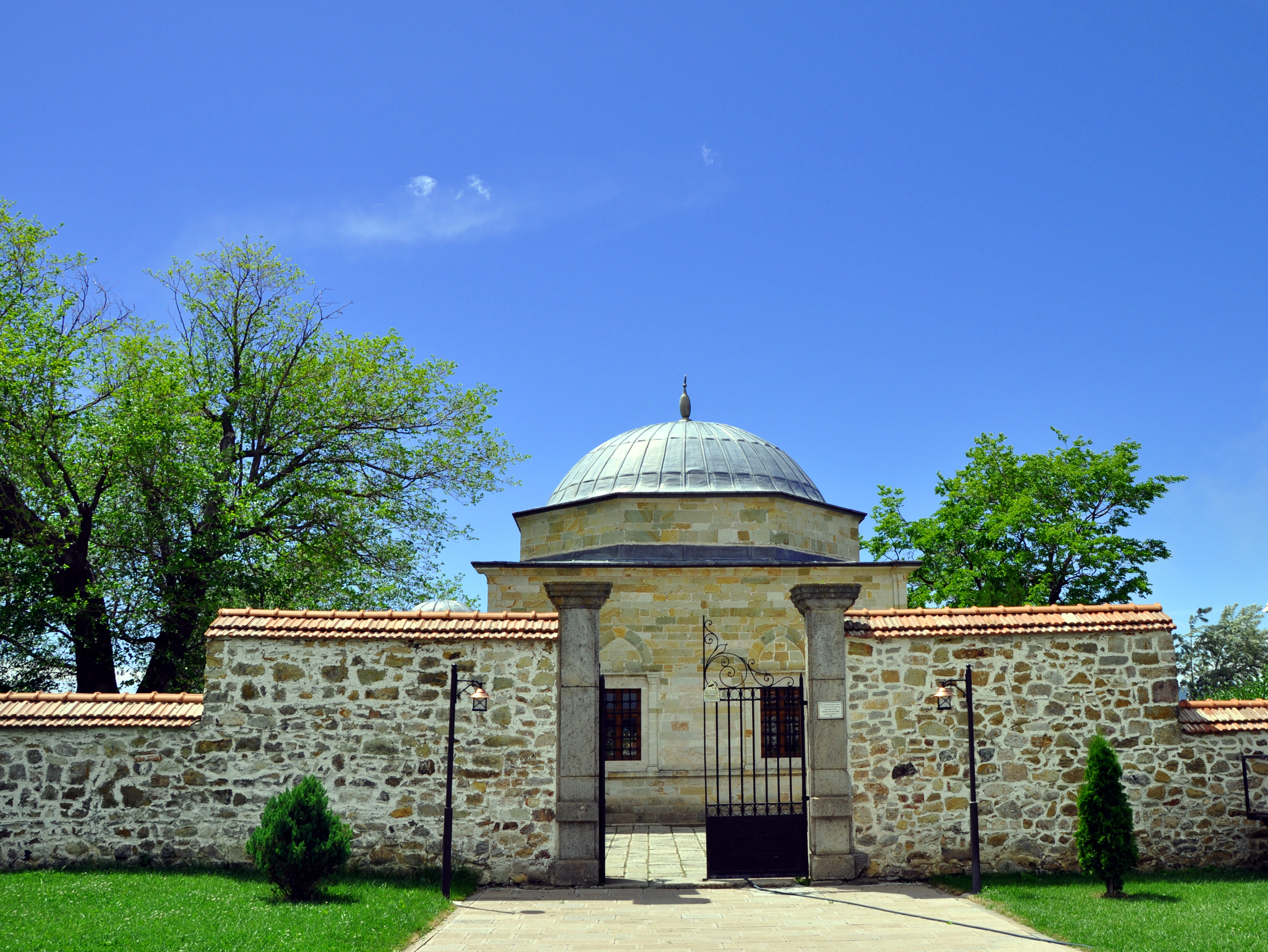
Tomb of Sultan Murad I after its renovation

The Tomb of Murad I (Albanian: Tyrbja e Sulltan Muratit; Turkish: Sultan I. Murad Türbesi, also known as Meşhed-i Hüdâvendigâr) is a mausoleum (türbe) dedicated to the Ottoman Sultan Murad I located in the Prishtina District, Kosovo.

Murad I (nicknamed Hüdavendigâr, meaning the "God-liked one" or the "sovereign" in this context) was killed in the Battle of Kosovo in 1389. The monument was built in the 14th century by Murad I's son Bayezid I, becoming the first example of Ottoman architecture in the Kosovo territory. His internal organs were buried in Kosovo field and remain to this day in the tomb at the site. Murad's other remains were taken to Bursa, his Anatolian birthplace, and buried there in his second tomb at the Hüdavendigâr complex in Bursa.

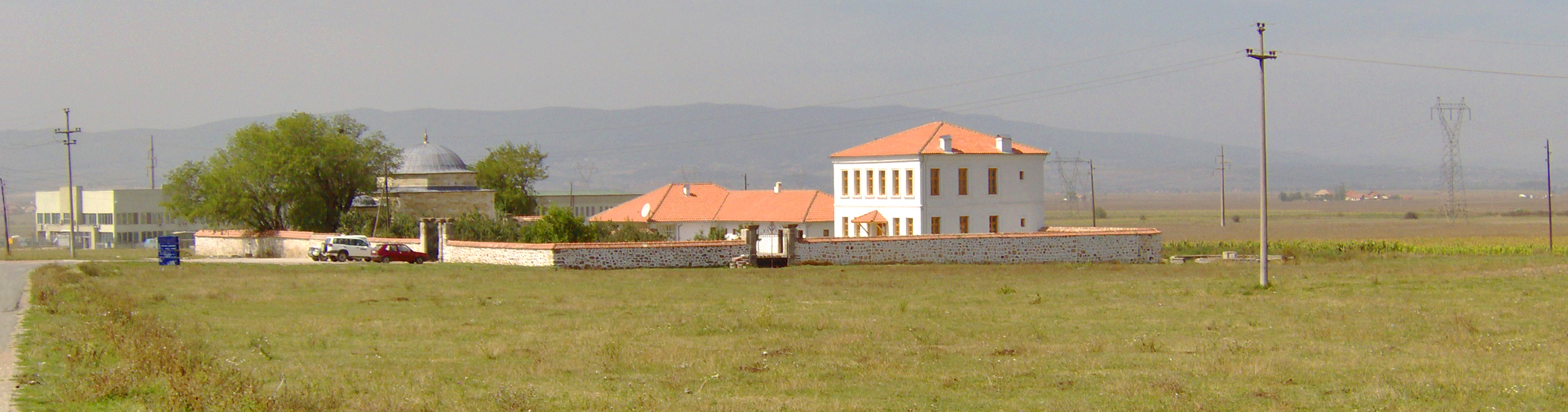
View outside of the Tomb of Murad I

The monument was mentioned by Evliya Çelebi in 1660. The tomb has gained a religious significance for the local Muslims.
