= Yakub Çelebi =

14th-century Ottoman prince

- Born: c. 1362; Ottoman Empire
- Died: 15 June 1389 (aged 26–27); Kosovo Field, Branković District (in present-day Kosovo)
- Burial: Bursa
- Consorts: Fülane Hatun; Paleologa princess
- Dynasty: Ottoman
- Father: Murad I
- Religion: Sunni Islam

Yakub Çelebi (Turkish: Yakup Çelebi, c. 1362 – 15 June 1389) was an Ottoman prince and the son of Murad I.

== Biography ==
He was educated from a young age and was accustomed to administrative and military education. He made a name for himself with his courage, heroism and benevolence and had been with his father Murad I in all his wars. Yakup Bey was a prince loved by the soldiers and the people, known for his prowess as a warrior. Some sources even claim that his father had appointed him as the heir.

Both he and his half-brother Bayezid I fought well in the Battle of Kosovo, the last expedition of their father Murad I. During the battle, Yakub Çelebi led the left flank of the army and was subjected to the intense attack by Serbian prince Lazar. With the Serbian army in a bad position, Yakub pursued them. While this was happening, his father, Murad I, was assassinated by a Serbian soldier, variously identified as the knight Miloš Obilić. The throne was given to Bayezid with the agreement of the pashas.

=== Death and legacy ===
In the Ottoman Empire, there was no established heritage system for the crown, and to prevent a possible civil war between himself and Yakub, Bayezid decided to murder his brother. Yakub, on the order of his brother Bayezid, was strangled and killed. The failed rebellion and resultant civil war that their brother had earlier caused may have influenced Bayezid's decision to kill Yakub.

Bayezid brought his brother's body to Bursa and buried it in a ceremony. There is no inscription about the tomb located in the northwest of the Yakub Çelebi Mosque in Iznik. The tomb of Yakub was buried in the Hüdavendigar Tomb in Bursa. Yakub Çelebi has a mosque in Iznik, a tomb and a bath in Keles. This tomb is numbered XIV and it was built towards the end of the century. It has a square plan and there are knitted feet at the corners of the tomb and they are connected to each other with pointed arches. Legs and arches are built with a single row of cut stones and three rows of bricks. A pendant dome based on these covers the tomb.

Yakub Çelebi's Story (Història de Jacob Xalabín), which has an important place in Medieval Catalan literature, is about the adventures of Yakub Çelebi and his murder by Bayezid in the Battle of Kosovo.

In the 1989 Yugoslav historical drama Battle of Kosovo, Çelebi is portrayed by Marko Baćović.

== Family ==
Yakub had two consorts:

- Fülane Hatun, daughter of Konstantin of Kostendil. Two of her sisters married Yakub's father Murad I and his half-brother Bayezid I.
- Paleologa princess, daughter of the Byzantine emperor John V and his wife Helena Kantakouzene. She married Yakub in 1386.
