= Lala Shahin Pasha =

Ottoman military commander and first Beylerbey of Rumelia

- لالا شاهین پاشا
- Born: c. 1330; Kırmasti, Ottoman Empire
- Died: c. 1388; Possibly Kazanlak, Bulgaria
- Burial place: Kazanlak (viscera); Kırmasti (body)
- Military career
- Allegiance: Ottoman Empire
- Branch: Ottoman Army
- Service years: 1360–1388
- Rank: Beylerbey of Rumelia
- Commands: Ottoman forces in Rumelia; campaigns in Bulgaria, Serbia and Bosnia
- Wars and campaigns: Byzantine–Ottoman wars; Ottoman conquest of Adrianople; Ottoman wars in Europe; Battle of Samokov; Battle of Sofia valley; Battle of Maritsa; Siege of Sofia; Battle of Pločnik; Battle of Bileća
- Other work: Ottoman military strategist, Governor

Lala Shahin Pasha (Turkish: Lala Şahin Paşa; c. 1330 – c. 1388), was an Ottoman military commander and the first Beylerbey of Rumelia. A mentor to Sultan Murad I, he played a central role in the Ottoman expansion into the Balkans, commanding key campaigns during the Byzantine–Ottoman wars and the Ottoman wars in Europe. He led forces at the Battle of Maritsa, the conquest of Adrianople and the Siege of Sofia, helping to establish lasting Ottoman control over much of modern-day Bulgaria, Macedonia and part of Serbia.

== Early life ==
Lala Shahin Pasha's early life is not well documented and much of the available information derives from later Ottoman sources. His father's name appears as Abdülmuîn in a surviving vakfiye (endowment deed), suggesting he may have been a Christian convert to Islam who entered state service. According to 17th-century historian Belgradî Hâkî Efendi, Shahin was originally a freed slave of Sultan Orhan. The existence of a mosque and religious complex (külliye) attributed to him in Kirmasti (modern-day Mustafakemalpaşa) supports the belief that he may have originated from this town.

Shahin's earliest known role was as Lala (tutor) to Orhan's son and heir, Murad. (Note: Lala (title) was the title given to senior advisors appointed to educate and guide Ottoman princes during their formative years.) This position signified a high level of trust and influence within the court. Following Murad's accession in 1362, Shahin was appointed beylerbey (governor-general) of Rumelia (Note: Rumelia, from the Turkish Rūm eli ("the Roman land"), was the name given by the Ottomans to the Balkan peninsula.) and commander-in-chief of Ottoman forces in Europe.

== Military career ==
In 1362, Shahin played a central role in the Ottoman conquest of Adrianople (modern-day Edirne), a pivotal conquest that marked the beginning of sustained Ottoman control in the Balkans. Following the accession of Murad I, a coordinated campaign was launched to expand Ottoman authority across Western Thrace, with Adrianople as its primary objective. Shahin, appointed beylerbey of Thrace, commanded one of three Ottoman forces deployed in a joint operation. While the main army advanced directly on Adrianople under Murad's command, Shahin and Evrenos Bey led flanking forces to secure surrounding territory and block any interference from Serbian or Bulgarian troops. A key battle unfolded near Bunar Hisar and Babaeski, where Byzantine forces were defeated, clearing the path for the Ottomans to occupy the city. Adrianople, which would remain the empire's capital until the fall of Constantinople in 1453, became a vital administrative and military hub. The campaign not only severed Byzantine access to Thrace but also strengthened Ottoman capacity to project power across both Europe and Anatolia.

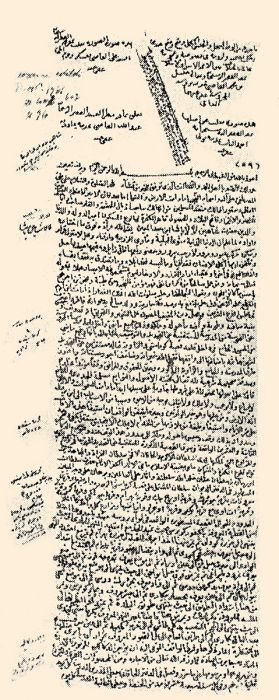
First page of the endowment deed (vakfiye) of Lala Şahin Pasha, preserved in the Ottoman Archives.

Following these successes, Shahin directed Ottoman forces in campaigns against Bulgarian and Serbian territories. In 1364, Shahin captured Boruj and Plovdiv, further consolidating Ottoman control in the region. Contemporary accounts describe large-scale enslavement of local populations during these campaigns. According to historian Dimitar Angelov, captives were transported to Sultan Murad's camp in Anatolia, where they were distributed among Ottoman soldiers, with a share reserved for religious leaders. Shahin later played a key role in the Battle of Maritsa on 26 September 1371, near the village of Chernomen (modern-day Ormenio, Greece). Ottoman sources occasionally date this campaign to 766 AH (1365 CE), describing a large Serbian force advancing toward Edirne while Murad I was in Anatolia. According to this tradition, Lala Shahin, cut off from reinforcements due to Byzantine control of the Gallipoli peninsula, coordinated a night-time assault led by Hacı İlbey near the Maritsa River. The surprise attack routed the Serbian forces, and the victory became known in Ottoman chronicles as the Sırp Sındığı (Destruction of the Serbs). Turkish historian and Ottomanist Abdülkadir Özcan, questions the reliability of the Ottoman accounts of this engagement.

The Ottoman army, under Shahin's command and supported by Evrenos Bey, faced a Serbian-led coalition commanded by King Vukašin Mrnjavčević and his brother Despot Uglješa. The Ottomans’ coordinated night attack resulted in a decisive victory, both Vukašin and Uglješa were killed in the battle, which opened the way for further Ottoman expansion into Macedonia and parts of Greece. Some historians suggest that Hacı İlbey, a rival general, known for the brilliant but unauthorised attack at Maritsa, may have been poisoned at Shahin's instigation. Historian J. V. A. Fine describes the Battle of Maritsa as "the Ottomans’ greatest success to that time", more significant than the 1389 Battle of Kosovo in opening the Balkans to Ottoman rule.

Following the victory at Maritsa, Shahin supported Murad I in further campaigns into Bulgarian and Serbian territory, targeting the domains of Ivan Shishman of Tarnovo and other local rulers resisting Ottoman expansion. In 1371, Ottoman forces routed a Christian army at the Battle of Samokov, southeast of Sofia, further securing Ottoman control in Bulgaria and accelerating the region's subjugation. In 1383, Shahin conquered Sofia, and from 1383 to 1385, served as the Ottoman governor of Sofia. His rule marked the formal integration of Sofia into the Ottoman administrative system, establishing a model for governance in newly conquered Balkan territories.

In 1385–1386, Shahin led an offensive against Lazar of Serbia, the ruler of Moravian Serbia, but was defeated on the bank of the Toplica River at the Battle of Pločnik. This marked a turning point, as regional powers increasingly resisted Ottoman incursions. Two years later, on 27 August 1388, Lala Shahin suffered another major defeat at the hands of the Bosnian Army of King Tvrtko I, commanded by Vlatko Vuković, at the Battle of Bileća. Some accounts suggest that Shahin had been dispatched by Murad I in response to a request for military support from George Stracimirović Balšić, the Lord of Zeta, who sought Ottoman assistance against Tvrtko. The Bosnian forces routed Shahin's troops at Bileća, north-east of Dubrovnik, marking a significant setback for Ottoman expansion in the region. According to some scholars, these setbacks may have influenced Murad I's decision to personally lead a new campaign against Lazar, the Serbian sovereign, culminating in the Battle of Kosovo in 1389.

== Death and legacy ==
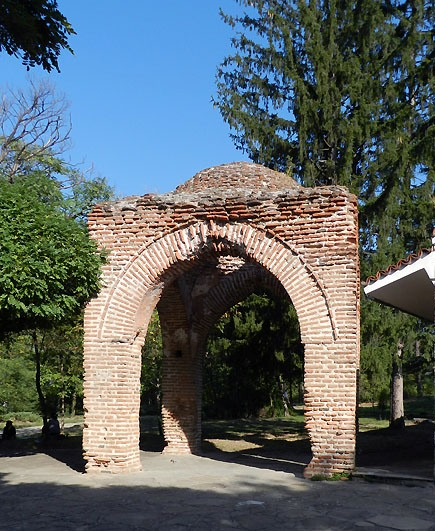
Tomb (türbe) of Lala Shahin, Kazanlak, Bulgaria (2019)

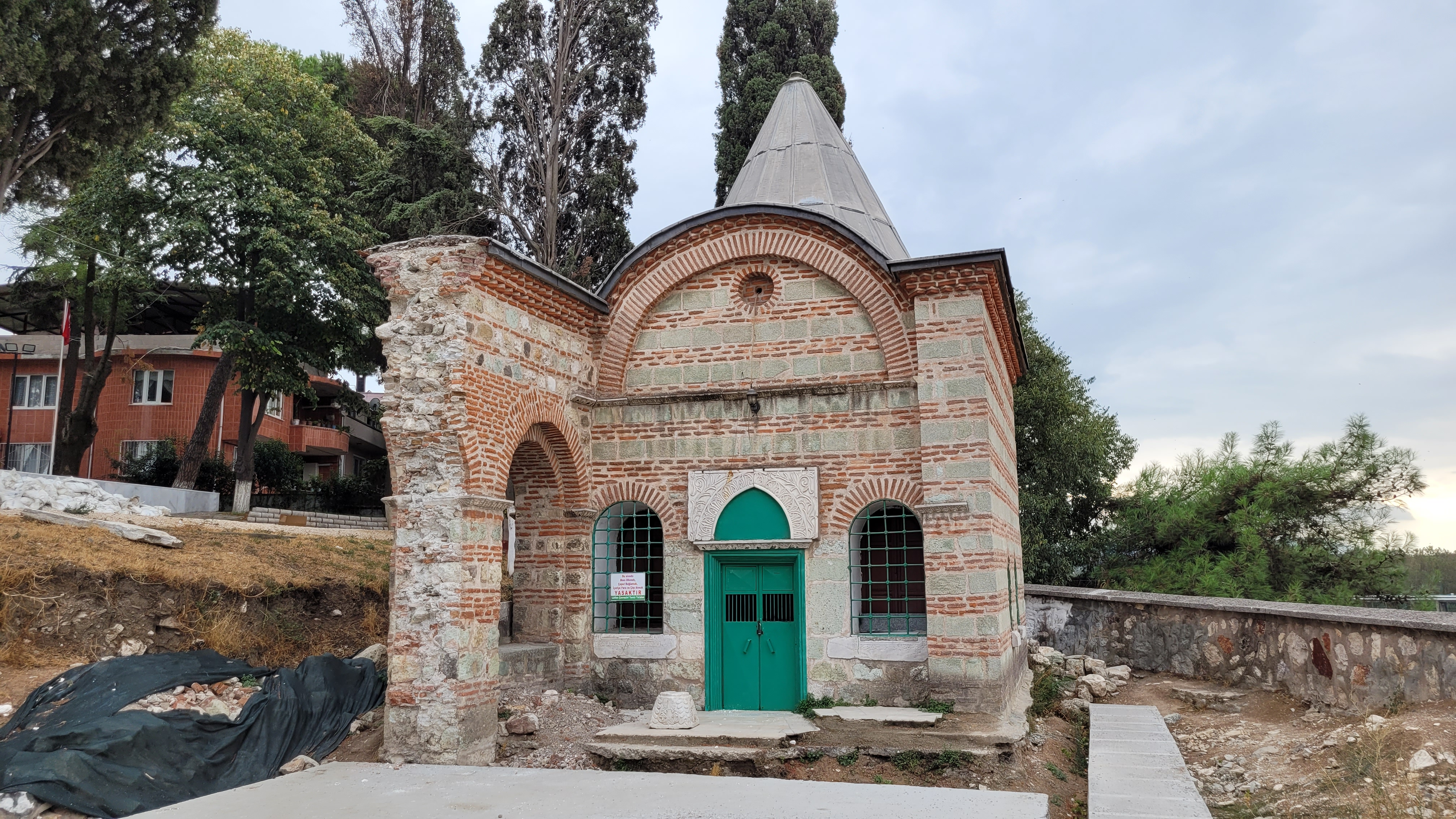
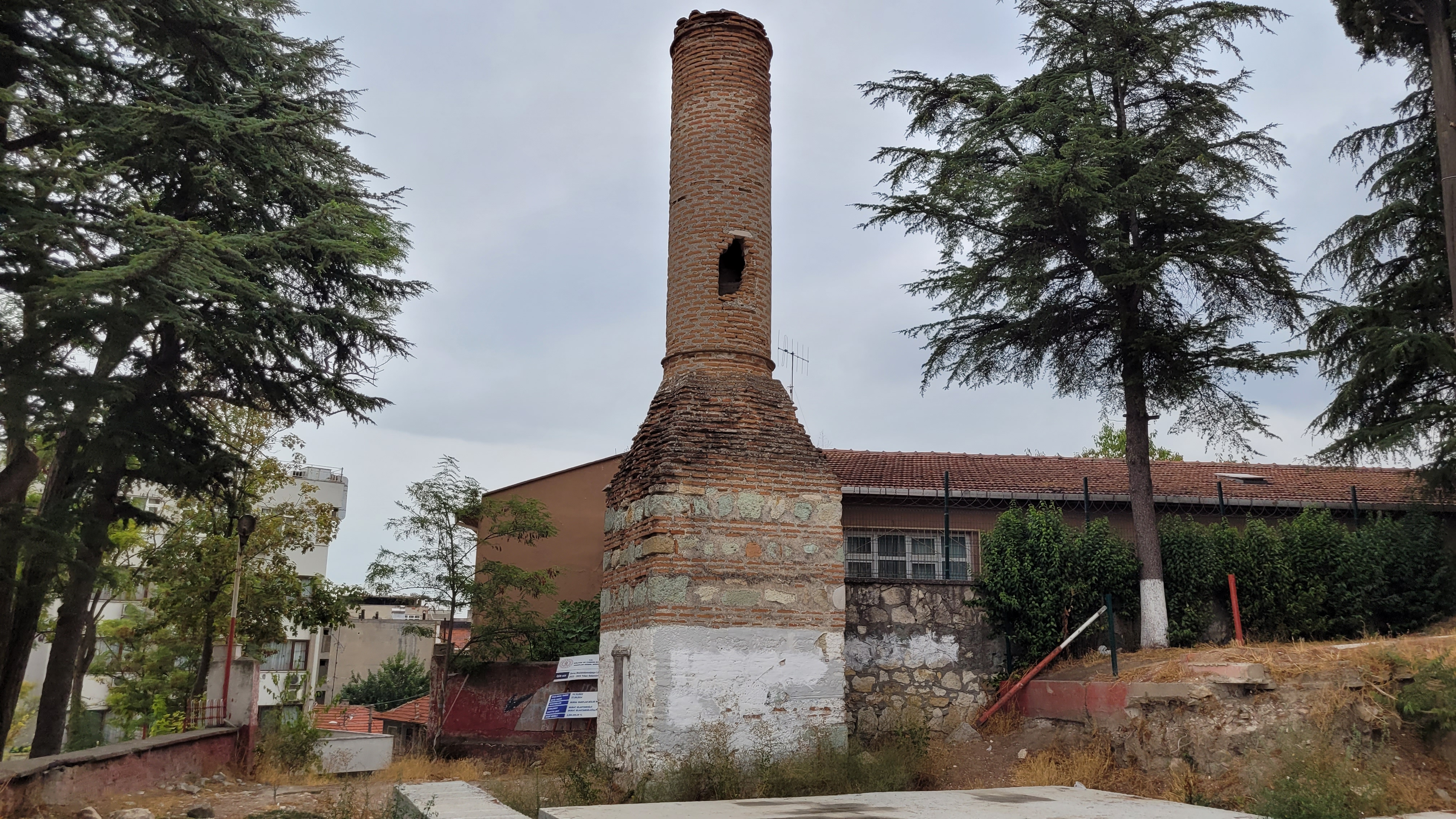
Tomb (türbe) of Lala Shahin Pasha and the remaining minaret of the adjacent mosque in Bursa, Turkey

According to Dutch historian Machiel Kiel, Lala Shahin likely died near Kazanlak, in central Bulgaria, around 1388. A small domed mausoleum (türbe) attributed to him stands on a ridge above the town and is considered one of the earliest surviving examples of Ottoman commemorative architecture in the Balkans. Kiel notes that, following a common Ottoman funerary custom, Lala Shahin's intestines were probably buried at the site where he died, while his body was taken for burial in Kırmasti (now Mustafakemalpaşa), west of Bursa, where a second tomb still exists. In Kirmasti he established a religious complex comprising a mosque, medrese, tekke, bathhouse, and tomb, endowed with revenues from twenty-eight shops and eight villages. The town of Lalapaşa in Edirne Province is named after him.

== Sources ==
- Angelov, Dimitar (1978). Jean Gouillard; Clive Foss (eds.). Certain Aspects of the Conquest of the Balkan Peoples by the Turks. Les Balkans au moyen âge: La Bulgarie des Bogomils aux Turcs. Translated by Miller, Michael J. London: Variorum Reprints. pp. 253–254. ISBN 0860780198.
- Boutrif, AbdelHakim (7 July 2021). Ottomans, Volume 01: Abrégé de l'Histoire des Ottomans (Moukhtassar at-Tarikh al-'Uthmaniyyine) (in French). Internet Archive.
- Fine, John Van Antwerp (1994). The Late Medieval Balkans: A Critical Survey from the Late Twelfth Century to the Ottoman Conquest. University of Michigan Press. ISBN 978-0-472-08260-5.
- Finkel, C. (2012). Osman's Dream: The Story of the Ottoman Empire 1300–1923. John Murray Press. p. 48. ISBN 978-1-84854-785-8.
- Fleet, Kate, ed. (2009). The Cambridge History of Turkey, Volume I: Byzantium to Turkey, 1071–1453. Cambridge University Press. p. 426. ISBN 978-0-521-62093-2.
- Imber, C. (2019). The Ottoman Empire, 1300-1650: The Structure of Power. Bloomsbury Publishing. ISBN 978-1-350-30762-9.
- Hussey, J. M., ed. (1966). The Cambridge Medieval History, Volume IV, Part I: The Byzantine Empire, Byzantium and Its Neighbours. Cambridge: Cambridge University Press. p. 762.
- İnalcık, H. (1998). Essays in Ottoman History. Eren. ISBN 978-975-7622-58-1.
- İnalcık, Halil (1978). The Ottoman Empire: Conquest, Organization and Economy. London: Variorum Reprints. pp. 155–159. ISBN 978-0-86078-032-8.
- Jaques, T. (2006). Dictionary of Battles and Sieges: A Guide to 8,500 Battles from Antiquity through the Twenty-first Century. Bloomsbury Publishing. ISBN 978-0-313-02799-4.
- İntepe, Nazım (2009). Dibâce (in Turkish). Kaynak Yayınları. ISBN 978-9944-125-83-3.
- Kiel, Machiel (2010). "The incorporation of the Balkans into the Ottoman Empire, 1353–1453". In Fleet, Kate (ed.). The Cambridge History of Turkey. Vol. 1. Cambridge University Press. pp. 138–191. doi:10.1017/CHOL9780521620932.006. ISBN 978-1-139-05596-3.
- Kissling, H.J.; Spuler, B.; Barbour, N.; Trimingham, J.S. (1997). The Last Great Muslim Empires. BRILL. ISBN 978-90-04-02104-4.
- Mikaberidze, A. (2011). Conflict and Conquest in the Islamic World: 2 volumes. Bloomsbury Publishing. ISBN 978-1-59884-337-8.
- Setton, Kenneth M. (1989). A History of the Crusades, Volume 6. University of Wisconsin Press. pp. 246–247. ISBN 978-0299107444.
- Sheppard, S. (2025). Crescent Dawn: The Rise of the Ottoman Empire and the Making of the Modern Age. Bloomsbury USA. ISBN 978-1-4728-5146-8.
- Özcan, Abdülkadir (2003). "Lala Şâhin Paşa". TDV İslâm Ansiklopedisi (in Turkish). Türkiye Diyanet Vakfı.
- Veinstein, Gilles (2009). L'Europe et l'islam. Odile Jacob. ISBN 978-2738199003.

Political offices
Preceded by post created	Beylerbey of the Rumelia Eyalet c. 1360—1382	Succeeded by unknown
