= Savcı Bey =

Ottoman prince (died 1374)

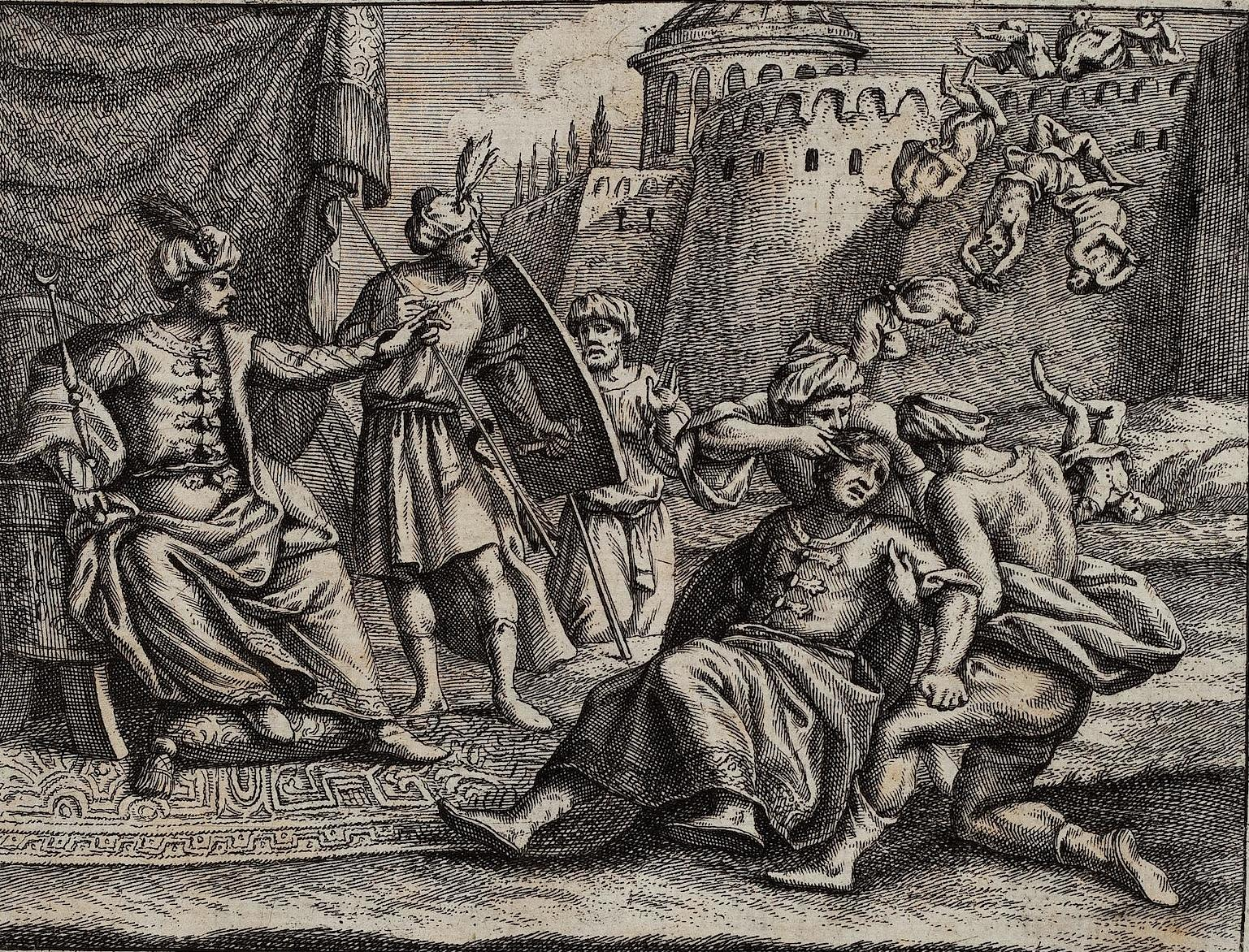
- Murad I blinding his son Savcı. Engraving from the German edition of "The present state of the Ottoman Empire" by Rycaut Paul (1694).

Sultan of the Ottoman Empire (Claimant)
- Reign: 1373
- Opposing: Murad I
- Died: 1374
- Father: Murad I
- Mother: Unknown

Savcı Bey (died in 1374) was a prince who, with Andronikos, rebelled against both of their fathers, the Ottoman Sultan Murad I and the Byzantine Emperor John V Palaiologos, respectively, in the 1370s. Savcı was the youngest of Murad's three sons. The name of his mother and birth year are unknown. In Ottoman tradition, all princes (Turkish: şehzade) were required to serve as provincial (sanjak) governors as a part of their training. Savcı's sanjak was Bursa, the co-capital of the empire (along with Edirne).

== Rebellion ==
When Ottoman Turks captured Edirne (Adrianopolis), Byzantine emperor John V Palaiologos appealed to the West for help. Instead, he was detained as a debtor in Venice. Andronikos (later Andronikos IV Palaiologos), his son and regent in Constantinople (modern Istanbul, Turkey), refused to pay the ransom for his father, and John had to give up the island Tenedos (modern Bozcaada, Turkey) to buy his freedom. After that event, John assigned his younger son Manuel (later Manuel II Palaiologos) as his crown prince and accepted the suzerainty of Ottomans in 1373. Thus, when the Ottoman sultan asked for his services against some rebellions in Ottoman lands, he had to leave his capital. This absence gave Andronikos a chance to rebel.

On the Ottoman side, Savcı Bey, who was the youngest of three brothers, saw that under the shadow of his older brothers, he had almost no chance to be enthroned in the future and faced a probable death under the traditional policy of fratricide in Ottoman succession. (This fear was not unreasonable; later when Murad I died older brother Bayezid I immediately killed the other brother Prince Yakup). He prepared to rebel to gain the post. While his father was occupied with suppressing the rebellions, Savcı saw his chance to revolt. Using the royal treasury under his disposal, he formed an army. The two rebellious princes, well aware of one another's interests, decided to collaborate and combined their forces.

== End of the rebellion ==
After learning about their sons' joint rebellion, Murat and John returned from Anatolia. The armies of the fathers and the sons met in Apikridion (an ambiguous location probably southwest of Constantinople), where Murat persuaded Savcı's soldiers to switch sides. Although the princes escaped to Didymoteicho (in modern Greece), they soon surrendered. After a short exchange, enraged Murat blinded Savcı. However, he changed his mind and had him executed. Although he asked John V to also blind his son, John was more merciful towards Andronikos and only blinded him in one eye. Andronikos went on to become the Byzantine emperor as Andronikos IV Palaiologos.

== Aftermath ==
Savcı's son, Davud Murad, was fled to Hungary. His name was mentioned in 1411 (during the Ottoman Interregnum) as an unsuccessful candidate to Ottoman throne and much later as an ally of John Hunyadi in his struggles against the Ottoman Empire.
