= Hacı İlbey =

Ottoman commander

Hacı İlbey (also known as Hadji Ilbeg or Haji Bey; c. 1305-1365 or 1371) was an Ottoman Turkish commander during the early years of the empire.

== Early years ==
He was probably born around 1305 in Balıkesir, northwestern Anatolia. He was a commander of the Beylik of Karasi, a principality situated at the Asiatic coast of the Dardanelles strait. However, during the interregnum in the beylik after the 1340s, Hacı İlbey left Karasid territory and took service in the Ottoman beylik, the future Ottoman Empire, situated at the north of the Karasids. In 1361, all territory of Karasids was annexed by the Ottomans during the reign of Orhan. It was around this time that the capital of the Ottoman state was moved from Bursa to Edirne.

== Ottoman commander ==
Hacı İlbey was tasked with conquests in Rumeli (European portion of Turkey), where the Turks under Süleyman Pasha, son of the Ottoman Beylik's second ruler Orhan, had set foot in 1354. In Rumeli, Hacı İlbey proved himself as a competent commander. He captured Lüleburgaz (medieval Arkadiapolis) and possibly Edirne (medieval Adrianopolis), which soon became the capital of the empire.

== Battle of Çirmen ==
While the new sultan Murad I was occupied in capturing Biga (Pigas of the antiquity) in Anatolia, a Crusader army appeared near the river Maritsa in Rumeli. Hacı İlbey was sent with a relatively small expedition force over to Crusaders. He defeated the Crusaders in a surprise night attack. There is no consensus on the date of this event. According to Ottoman chronicles, the battle took place in 1364 and according to western sources in 1371.

== Death ==
Shortly after the battle of Çirmen, Hacı İlbey died. According to a legend, he was poisoned by Lala Şahin Pasha, a senior Ottoman commander, who was Hacı İlbey's rival and worried of his increasing reputation.
