= Yanuka =

Bulgarian defender of Sofia

Ban Yanuka (Bulgarian: Бан Янука), was the Bulgarian defender of Sofia from the Ottoman Turks in the late 14th century and was the manager/deputy of the Tsar Ivan Shishman in Sredets. It is quite possible in the person of the "ban Yanko".
