= Murad I =

Sultan of the Ottoman Empire from 1362 to 1389

- Bey; Emîr-i a’zam; Ghazi; Han; Hüdavendigâr; Sultânü’s-selâtîn; Melikü’l-mülûk
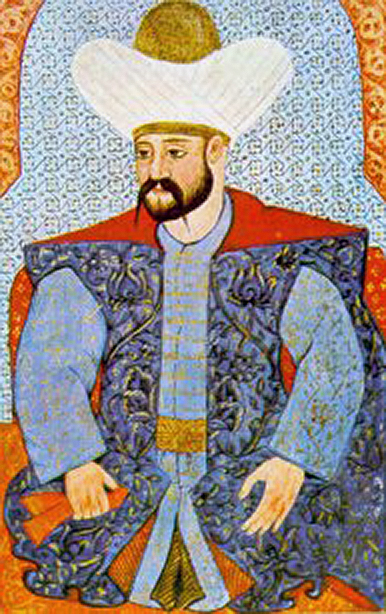
- Miniature portrait of Murad I

Sultan of the Ottoman Empire (Padishah)
- Reign: March 1362 – 15 June 1389
- Predecessor: Orhan
- Successor: Bayezid I
- Born: 29 June 1326; Bursa, Ottoman Beylik
- Died: 15 June 1389 (aged 62); Kosovo field, District of Branković
- Cause of death: Assassination
- Burial: Organs buried at Tomb of Murad I, Kosovo; 42°42′07″N 21°06′15″E; Body buried at Sultan Murad Türbe, Osmangazi, Bursa
- Consorts: Gülçiçek Hatun; Thamara Hatun; Paşa Melek Hatun; Others
- Issue Among others: Savci Bey; Bayezid I Yakub Çelebi; Nefise Hatun
Names
- Murad bin Orhan
- Dynasty: Ottoman
- Father: Orhan
- Mother: Nilüfer Hatun
- Religion: Sunni Islam
- Tughra
- Military career
- Conflicts: See list: Conquest Campaigns in Rumelia (1359-1362); Conquest of Ankara; Battle of Eskişehir; Conquest of Eskişehir; Campaign in Karamanids; Conquest of Lüleburgaz; Conquest of Çorlu; Conquest of Filibe; Conquest of Gümülcine; Conquest of Karabiga; Conquest of Aydos; Savcı Bey's Rebellion; Battle of Frenkyazısı (1387); Battle of Kosovo

Murad I (Ottoman Turkish: مراد اول; Turkish: I. Murad), nicknamed Hüdavendigâr, (from Persian: خداوندگار, romanized: Khodāvandgār, lit. 'the devotee of God' – meaning "sovereign" in this context; 29 June 1326 – 15 June 1389) was the sultan of the Ottoman Empire from 1362 until his assassination during the Battle of Kosovo in 1389. He was the son of Orhan Gazi and Nilüfer Hatun. Murad I came to the throne after his elder half-brother Süleyman Pasha's death.

Murad I conquered Adrianople in 1360s and made it the new capital of the Ottoman Sultanate. Then he further expanded the Ottoman realm in Southern Europe by bringing most of the Balkans under Ottoman rule, and forced the princes of Serbia, the emperor of Bulgaria as well as the Byzantine emperor John V Palaiologos to pay him tribute. Murad I administratively divided his sultanate into the two provinces of Anatolia (Asia Minor) and Rumelia (the Balkans).

== Titles ==
According to the Ottoman sources, Murad I's titles included Bey, Emîr-i a’zam (Great Emir), Ghazi, Hüdavendigâr, Khan, Padishah, Sultânü’s-selâtîn (Sultan of sultans), Melikü’l-mülûk (Malik of maliks), while in Bulgarian and Serbian sources he was referred to as Tsar. In a Genoese document, he was referred to as dominus armiratorum Turchie (Master lord of Turks).

== Battles ==
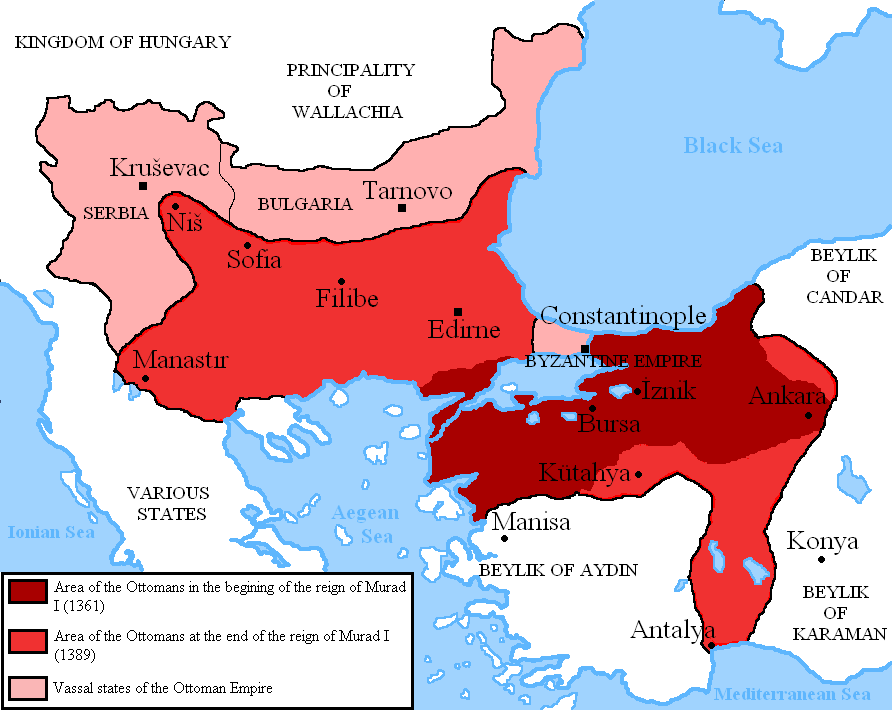
Map of the conquests of Murad I

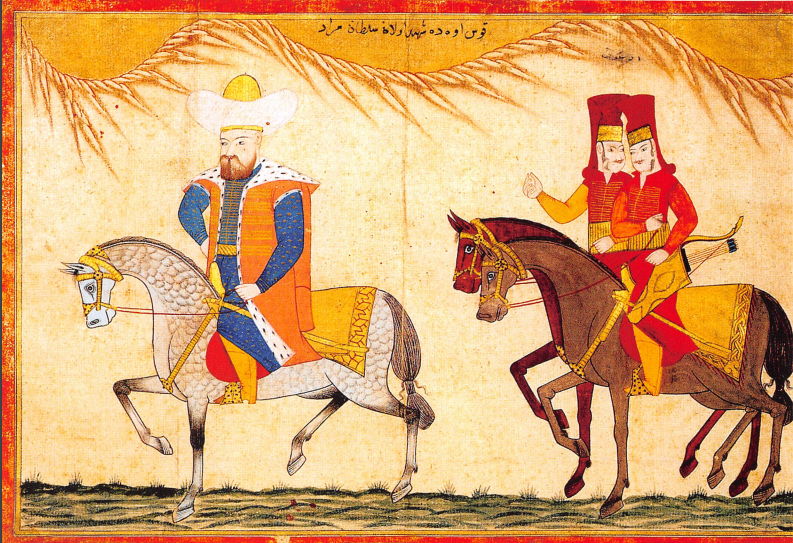
16th century miniature depicting Murad I

Murad fought against the powerful beylik of Karaman in Anatolia and against the Serbs, Albanians, Bulgarians and Hungarians in Europe. In particular, a Serb expedition to expel the Turks from Adrianople led by the Serbian brothers King Vukašin and Despot Uglješa, was defeated on September 26, 1371, by Murad's capable second lieutenant Lala Şâhin Paşa, the first governor (beylerbey) of Rumeli. In 1385, the important Bulgarian city Sofia fell to the Ottomans. In 1386, Prince Lazar Hrebeljanović defeated an Ottoman force at the Battle of Pločnik. The Ottoman army suffered heavy casualties, and was unable to capture Niš on the way back.

=== Battle of Kosovo between Ottomans and Serbs ===
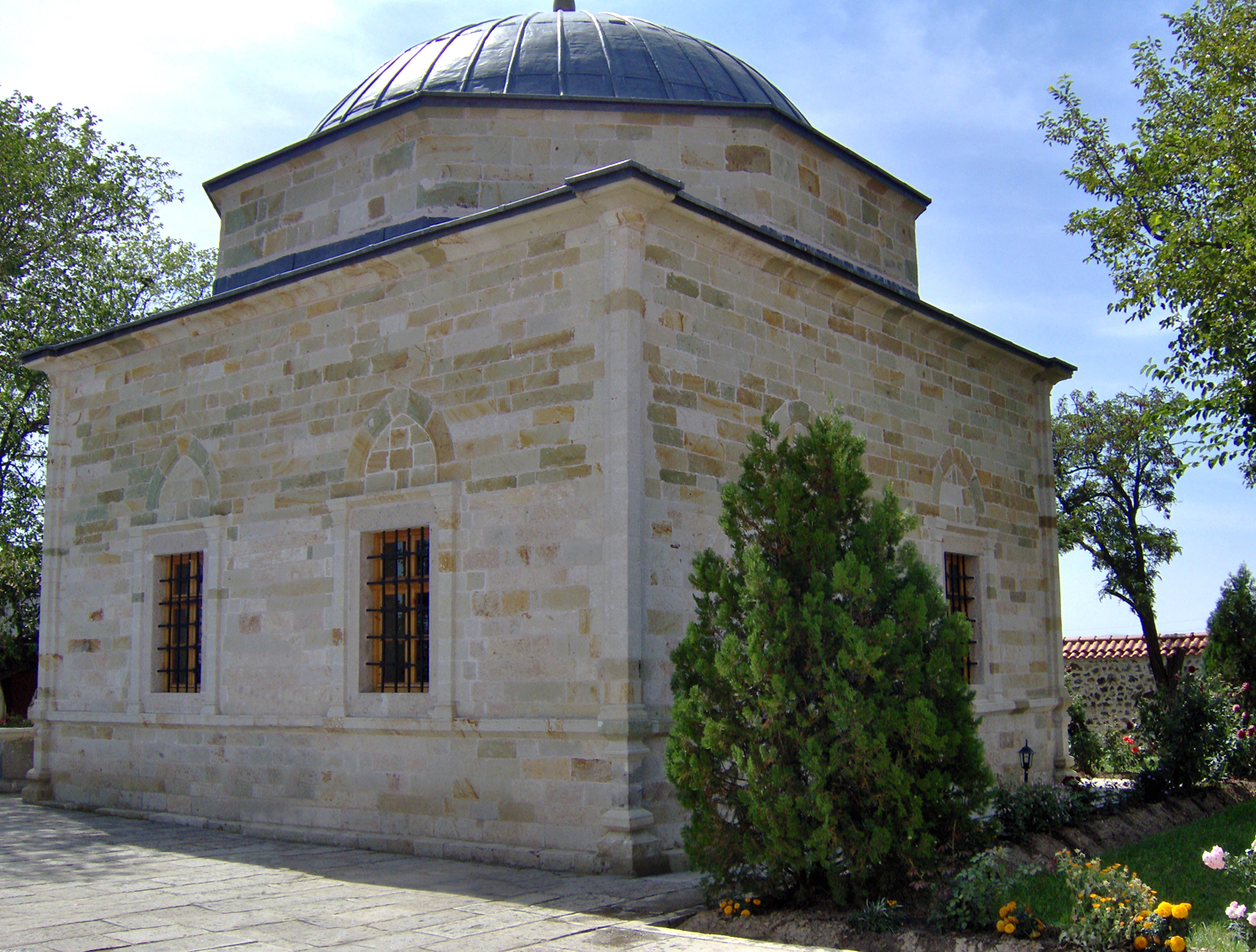
Tomb of Sultan Murad on Kosovo field

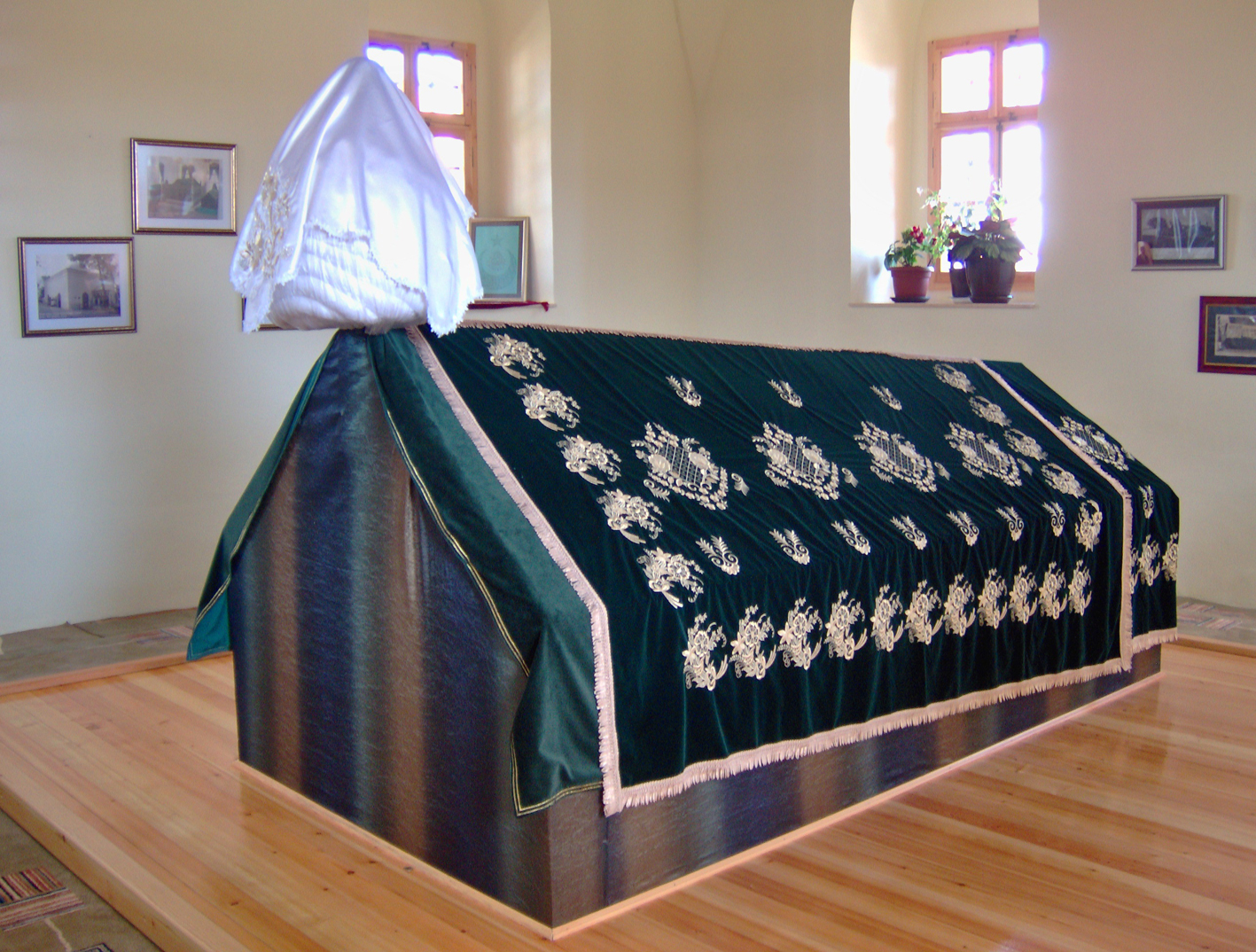
Tomb of Sultan Murad

In 1389, Murad's army fought the Serbian Army and its allies under the leadership of Lazar at the Battle of Kosovo.

There are different accounts from different sources about when and how Murad I was assassinated. The contemporary sources mainly noted that the battle took place and that both Prince Lazar and the Sultan lost their lives in the battle. The existing evidence of the additional stories and speculations as to how Murad I died were disseminated and recorded in the 15th century and later, decades after the actual event. One Western source states that during the first hours of the battle, Murad I was assassinated by Serbian nobleman and knight Miloš Obilić, who wanted to meet him in person, by knife. Some sources state the assassin pretended to defect to the Ottomans, while most Ottoman chroniclers (including Dimitrie Cantemir) state that he was assassinated while he was inspecting the battlefield after the battle had finished. His older son Bayezid, who was in charge of the left wing of the Ottoman forces, took charge after that. His other son, Yakub Bey, who was in charge of the other wing, was called to the Sultan's command center tent by Bayezid, but when Yakub Bey arrived he was strangled, leaving Bayezid as the sole claimant to the throne.

In a letter from the Florentine senate (written by Coluccio Salutati) to the King Tvrtko I of Bosnia, dated 20 October 1389, Murad I's (and Yakub Bey's) killing was described. A party of twelve Serbian lords slashed their way through the Ottoman lines defending Murad I. One of them, allegedly Obilić, had managed to get through to the Sultan's tent and kill him with sword stabs to the throat and belly.

Murad's internal organs were buried in Kosovo field and remain to this day on a corner of the battlefield in a location called Meshed-i Hudavendigar which has gained a religious significance for the local Muslims. It was vandalized between 1999 and 2006 and was renovated. His other remains were carried to Bursa, his Anatolian capital city, and were buried in a tomb at the complex built in his name.

== Appearance and character ==
Murad I is described in Ottoman sources as a medium-height, round-faced, aquiline-nosed, charitable, just ruler who devoted his life to the holy war. In Byzantine sources, he is remembered as a sultan who spoke little but spoke eloquently, was fond of hunting, tireless, merciful to Christians, but did not tolerate mistakes and could resort to harshness, and was always successful against his enemies.

== Family ==
Murad was the son of Orhan and Nilüfer Hatun, a slave concubine who was of ethnic Greek descent.

=== Consorts ===
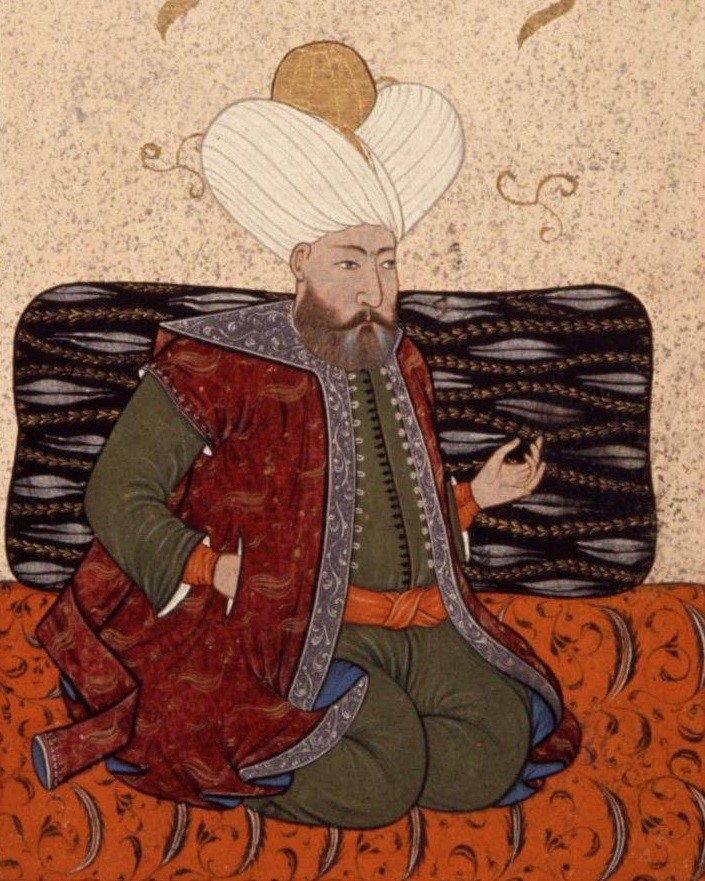
16th century miniature of Murad I

Murad I had at least seven consorts:

- Gülçiçek Hatun. Slave concubine, mother of Bayezid I.
- Paşa Melek Hatun. Daughter of Kızıl Murad Bey and mother of Nilüfer Hatun.
- Kera Tamara Hatun. Bulgarian princess, daughter of Tsar Ivan Alexander of Bulgaria. After Bulgaria was subjected to tribute, she married Murad I in 1376. It is believed that she had no children. There is no further information about her.
- Daughter of Candaroğlu Süleyman II Paşa, married Murad around 1383.

Some historians have also suggested that the following women may have been among Murad's wives, although these marriages remain unconfirmed.

- Daughter of Ahî Seyyid Sultân, married Murad in 1366.
- Daughter of Konstantin of Kostendil, she married Murad after 1372. Two of her sisters married two of Murad’s sons, Bayezid I and Yakub Çelebi
- Daughter of the Byzantine emperor John V. According to some sources, she married Murad I in 1389, while two of her sisters married his sons Bayezid and Yakub. However, according to the contemporary Venetian source Raffaino de Caresinis, Andronikos IV Palaiologos offered his sister Maria in marriage to Murad I in 1376, but she died before the marriage could take place.

=== Sons ===
Murad I had at least five sons:

- Savci Bey (died in 1374). Executed by his father after he rebelled against him.
- Bayezid I (1360 - 1403) - with Gülçiçek Hatun. Ottoman Sultan.
- Yakub Çelebi (c. 1362 - 20 June 1389). Strangled on Bayezid's orders.
- İbrahim Bey (c. 1365 - c. 1385). He died in Edirne and buried in the Osman I mausoleum.
- Yahşi Bey (? - before 1389) - with Gülçiçek Hatun.

=== Daughters ===
Murad I had at least five daughters:

- Nefise Melek Sultan Hatun (c. 1363 - after 1403). In 1378 she was married off to Karamânoğlu Alâeddîn Alî Bey in an unsuccessful attempt to stop the war. She had at least three sons by him: Mehmed II Bey (1379 - 1423), Alaeddin Ali II Bey (1381 - 1424) and Oğuz Bey (probably died in infancy). Widowed in 1397, she returned to live in Bursa, but on the death of Bayezid I returned to Karaman, where her eldest son assumed the throne.
- Özer Hatun. She married and had issue. In 1426 her grandson Mehmed Bey held a post at court of Murad II.
- Erhundi Hatun. She married Saruhânoğlu Hızır Bey before 1389.
- Mihriali Devlet Sultan Hatun. She married Karamânoglu Turgut Bey, by whom she had a son, Mahmud Bey.
- Nilüfer Hatun–with Paşa Melek Hatun. She built a mosque at Bursa.

Murad I House of Osman Born: 1326 Died: 1389
Regnal titles
Preceded by Orhan	Ottoman Sultan; 1362 – 15 June 1389	Succeeded by Bayezid I
