= National myth =

Inspiring narrative about a nation's past

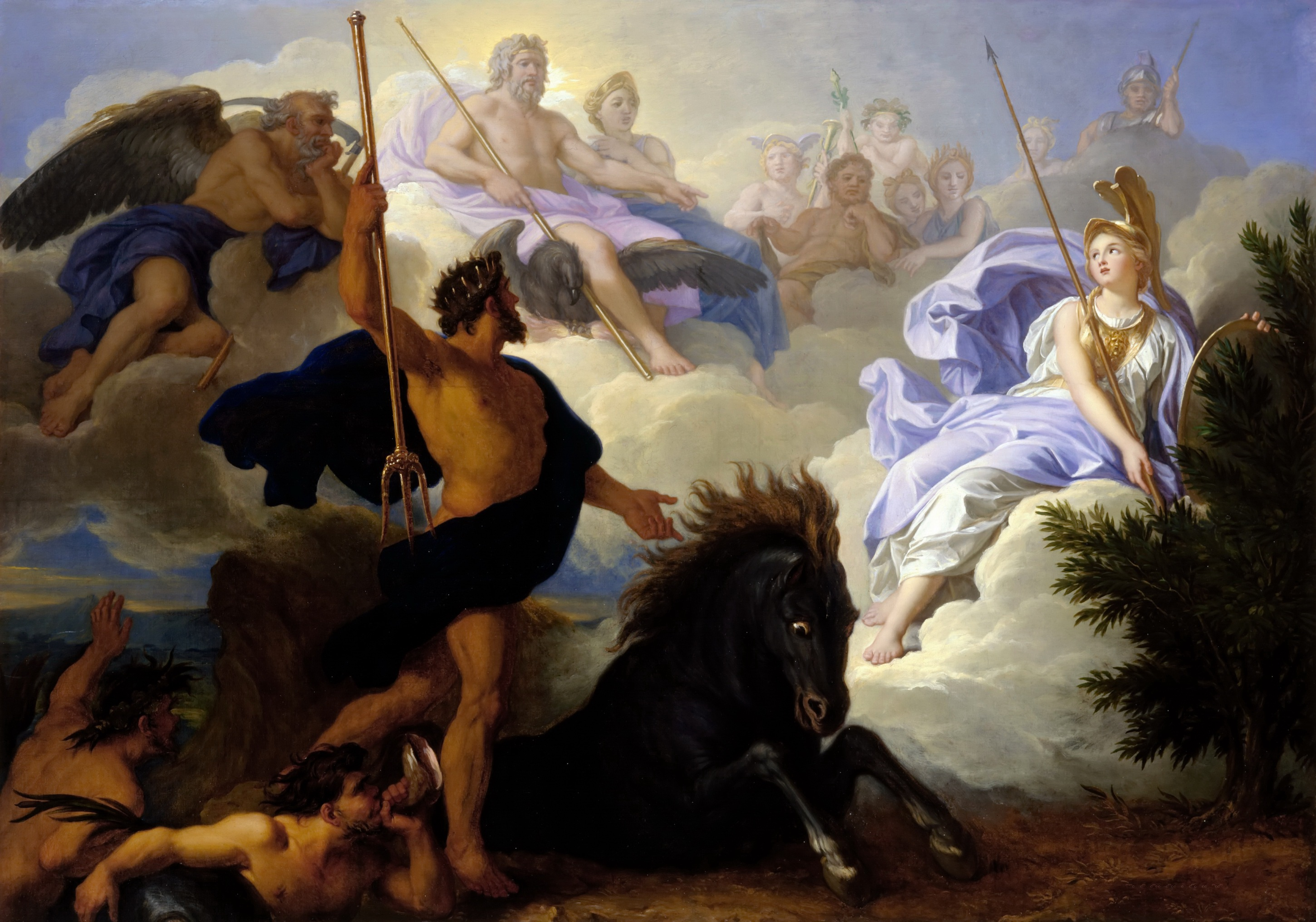
The Dispute of Minerva and Neptune (c. 1689 or 1706) by René-Antoine Houasse, depicting the founding myth of Athens

A national myth is a narrative about a nation's past. Such myths often serve as important national symbols and affirm a set of national values. A myth is fictitious and often mixed with aspects of history to form a mythos, which itself has been described as "a pattern of beliefs expressing often symbolically the characteristic or prevalent attitudes in a group or culture". Myths thereby operate in a specific social and historical setting that help structure national imagination and identity. A national myth may take the form of a national epic, or it may be incorporated into a civil religion.

A national myth is a narrative which has been elevated to a symbolic and esteemed level so as to be true to the nation. The national folklore of many nations includes a founding myth, which may involve a struggle against colonialism or a war of independence or unification. In many cases, the meaning of the national myth is disputed among different parts of the population. In some places, the national myth may be spiritual and refer to stories of the nation's founding by a god or gods, leaders favored by gods, or other supernatural beings. National myths often exist for the purpose of state-sponsored propaganda. In totalitarian dictatorships, the leader might be given, for example, a mythical supernatural life history in order to make them seem god-like and supra-powerful. In liberal regimes they can inspire civic virtue and self-sacrifice or consolidate the power of dominant groups and legitimate their rule.

== National identity ==
The concept of national identity is connected with myths. A complex of myths is at the core of nationalistic ethnic identity. Some scholars believe that national identities, supported by invented histories, were constructed only after national movements and national ideologies emerged.

All modern national identities were preceded by nationalist movements. Although the term "nation" was used in the Middle Ages, it had usually an ethnic meaning and seldom referred to a state. In the age of nationalism, it was linked to efforts aimed at creating nation-states.

National myths foster national identities. They are important tools of nation-building, which can be done by emphasizing differences between people of different nations. They can cause conflict as they exaggerate threats posed by other nations and minimize the costs of war.

The nationalist myth of a stable homeland community is explained psychoanalytically as the result of the complexity of relations within the modern external world and the incoherence of one's inner psychological world. Nationalist identity facilitates imagined stability.

== Dissemination ==
National myths are created and propagated by national intellectuals, and they can be used as instruments of political mobilization on demographic bases such as ethnicity.

They might over-dramatize incidents, omit historical details, or add details for which there is no evidence; or a national myth might simply be a fictional story that no one takes to be true literally.

=== Mythopoeic methods ===
Traditional myth-making often depended on literary story-tellers — especially epic poets. Ancient Hellenic culture adopted Homer's Ionian Iliad as a justification of its theoretical unity, and Virgil (70–19 BCE) composed the Aeneid in support of the political renewal and reunification of the Roman world after lengthy civil wars. Generations of medieval writers (in poetry and prose) contributed to the Arthurian Matter of Britain, developing what became a focus for English nationalism by adopting British Celtic material. Camões (c. 1524–1580) composed in Macao the Os Lusíadas as a national poetic epic for Portugal. Voltaire attempted a similar work for French mythologised history in the Henriade (1723). Wagnerian opera came to foster German national enthusiasm.

=== Other methods ===
Modern purveyors of national mythologies have tended to appeal to the people more directly through the media. French pamphleteers spread the ideas of Liberté, égalité, fraternité in the 1790s, and American journalists, politicians, and scholars popularized mythic tropes like "Manifest Destiny", "the Frontier", or the "Arsenal of Democracy". Socialists advocating ideas like the dictatorship of the proletariat have promoted catchy nation-promoting slogans such as "Socialism with Chinese characteristics" and "Kim Il Sung thought".

== National myths ==
The ideology of nationalism is related to two myths: the myth of the eternal nation, referring to the permanence of a community, and the myth of common ancestry. These are represented in the particular national myths of various countries and groups.

=== Armenia ===
Armenian national myth postulates the foundation of Armenia as a result of a battle between the Armenian founding father Hayk Nahapet and Belus, a wicked giant, which ruled over Babylon. According to the legend in History of Armenia by Movses Khorenatsi, Belus tried to impose his tyrannical rule on the Armenian people, but as soon as Hayk's son Armaniak was born, Hayk led his people to Ararat, built a village at its slope and named it "Haykashen". Belus led a massive force to submit the Armenian nation, but lost a battle near lake Van.

=== Brazil ===
The national myth of Brazil as a racial democracy was advanced by Brazilian sociologist Gilberto Freyre in his 1933 work Casa-Grande & Senzala, which argues that Brazilians do not view each other through the lens of race, and that Brazilian society eliminated racism. Freyre's theory became a source of national pride for Brazil, which contrasted itself favorably vis-a-vis the contemporaneous racial divisions and violence in the United States.

=== Finland ===
The Kalevala is a 19th-century work of epic poetry compiled by Elias Lönnrot from Karelian and Finnish oral folklore and mythology. The Kalevala is regarded as the national epic of Karelia and Finland. (Note: Professor Tolkien disagreed with this characterization: "One repeatedly hears the 'Land of Heroes' described as the 'national Finnish Epic': as if a nation, besides if possible a national bank theatre and government, ought also automatically to possess a national epic. Finland does not. The K[alevala] is certainly not one. It is a mass of conceivably epic material; but, and I think this is the main point, it would lose nearly all that which is its greatest delight if it were ever to be epically handled.") It narrates an epic story about the Creation of the Earth, describing the controversies and retaliatory voyages between the peoples of the land of Kalevala called Väinölä and the land of Pohjola and their various protagonists and antagonists as well as the construction and robbery of the epic mythical wealth-making machine Sampo. The Kalevala was instrumental in the development of the Finnish national identity and the intensification of Finland's language strife that ultimately led to Finland's independence from Russia in 1917.

=== Great Britain ===
King Arthur was a legendary noble king that united Britain, laid the foundation to medieval notions of chivalry in western Europe, and was later important for building a common British identity.

=== Greece ===
According to Greek mythology, the Hellenes descend from Hellen. He is the child of Deucalion (or Zeus) and Pyrrha, and the father of three sons, Dorus, Xuthus, and Aeolus, by whom he is the ancestor of the Greek peoples.

=== Iceland ===
The sagas of Icelanders, also known as family sagas, are one sub-genre or text groups of Icelandic sagas. They are prose narratives mostly based on historical events that mostly took place in Iceland in the ninth, tenth, and early eleventh centuries, during the so-called Saga Age. They were written in Old Icelandic, a western dialect of Old Norse. They are the best-known specimens of Icelandic literature. They are focused on history, especially genealogical and family history. They reflect the struggle and conflict that arose within the societies of the early generations of Icelandic settlers. The Icelandic sagas are valuable and unique historical sources about medieval Scandinavian societies and kingdoms, in particular regarding pre-Christian religion and culture and heroic age.

=== Italy ===
The Kingdom of Fanes is the national epic of the Ladin people in the Dolomites and the most important part of the Ladin literature. Originally an orally transmitted epic cycle, today it is known through the work of Karl Felix Wolff in 1932, gathered in Dolomitensagen. This legend is part of the larger corpus of the South Tyrolean sagas, whose protagonists are the Fanes themselves.

=== Iran ===
The Shahnameh is a long epic poem written by the Persian poet Ferdowsi between c. 977 and 1010 CE and is the national epic of Persia. Consisting of some 50,000 distichs or couplets (two-line verses), the Shahnameh is one of the world's longest epic poems, and the longest epic poem created by a single author. It tells mainly the mythical and to some extent the historical past of the Persian Empire from the creation of the world until the Muslim conquest in the seventh century.

During the 20th century, the Pahlavi dynasty (1925–1979) deliberately mobilized national myths, particularly those found in the Shahnameh, to construct a sense of Iranian identity, nationalism, and political legitimacy. Reza Shah and later Mohammad Reza Shah emphasized Iran's pre-Islamic past as a period of glory, heroism, and centralized authority, portraying themselves as heirs to this historical legacy.

The Pahlavis also framed the Arab-Muslim conquest of Persia in the 7th century as a historical trauma that ended Iran's greatness, using this interpretation in textbooks, public speeches, monuments, and celebrations to highlight a period of perceived weakness and foreign domination — implicitly linking Islam with constraints on Iranian political and cultural development. By contrast, pre-Islamic heroes from the Shahnameh and other Persian traditions were promoted as symbols of national strength, resilience, and independence, reinforcing secular, centralized, and nationalist identity.

National myths under the Pahlavis served multiple purposes: fostering Iranian pride in pre-Islamic heritage, justifying the monarchy's modernizing reforms, and constructing a narrative of continuity connecting the contemporary state to an illustrious Persian past. This culminated with grand ceremonies such as the celebration of the Persian monarchy in 1971 — an event designed to dramatize this mythic lineage and solidify the symbolic power of pre-Islamic heroes and kings in contemporary politics.

=== Israel ===
The concept of the Promised Land (land promised to Abraham and his descendants) functions as a foundational national myth in the context of Israeli identity. The narrative originates in ancient Jewish texts. Beyond its theological roots, the myth acquired modern political and cultural significance, particularly during the 19th and 20th centuries with the rise of Zionism and the establishment of the State of Israel.

The narrative portrays the land as divinely promised, emphasizing themes of historical continuity, resilience, and collective destiny. It was central to early Zionist ideology, justifying Jewish migration to Mandate-era Palestine and the creation of a national homeland. The mythic dimension provided both moral legitimacy and symbolic cohesion for the movement, reinforcing the idea of return to an ancestral homeland as a sacred and historical mission.

Cultural works have further popularized and reinforced the national myth. The 1958 historic fiction novel Exodus by Leon Uris dramatizes the experiences of Jewish refugees after the Holocaust and their struggle to establish the modern State of Israel. The book presents the Promised Land narrative in human and emotional terms, portraying the land as both a historical inheritance and a site of liberation and survival. Exodus reached a global audience, shaping public perceptions of the Israeli national narrative and reinforcing the symbolic power of the Promised Land in collective consciousness. Exodus was widely distributed, including through support by Israeli institutions, and became a tool in promoting international sympathy for the new state and Zionist aims.

The Promised Land narrative also continues to influence Israeli society, education, and political discourse. Commemorations, literature, and public symbolism frequently draw on this myth, linking historical memory with contemporary identity. While serving as a unifying national myth for many, it is also contested in the context of the Israeli–Palestinian conflict, illustrating how mythic interpretations of history can affect territorial claims, political legitimacy, and collective memory.

=== Japan ===
In Japanese mythology, Emperor Jimmu is the legendary first emperor of Japan. He is described in the Nihon Shoki and Kojiki. His ascension is traditionally dated as 660 BC. He is said to be a descendant of the sun goddess Amaterasu, through her grandson Ninigi, as well as a descendant of the storm god Susanoo. He launched a military expedition from Hyūga near the Seto Inland Sea, captured Yamato, and established this as his center of power. In modern Japan, Emperor Jimmu's legendary accession is marked as National Foundation Day on February 11. There is no evidence to suggest that Jimmu existed. However, there is a high probability that there was a powerful dynasty in the vicinity of Miyazaki Prefecture during the Kofun period.

=== Korea ===
The first Korean kingdom is said to have been founded by Dangun, the legendary founder and god-king of Gojoseon, in 2333 BCE. Dangun is said to be the "grandson of heaven" and "son of a bear". The earliest recorded version of the Dangun legend appears in the 13th-century Samguk Yusa, which cites China's Book of Wei and Korea's lost historical record Gogi; it has been confirmed that there is no relevant record in China's Book of Wei. There are around seventeen religious groups involving the worship of Dangun.

=== New Zealand ===
The Treaty of Waitangi is a document of central importance to the history of New Zealand, its constitution, and its national mythos. It has played a major role in the treatment of the Māori people in New Zealand by successive governments and the wider population, something that has been especially prominent since the late 20th century. The treaty document is an agreement, not a treaty as recognised in international law, and has no independent legal status. It was first signed on 6 February 1840 by Captain William Hobson as consul for the British Crown and by Māori chiefs (rangatira) from the North Island of New Zealand.

Kupe was a legendary Polynesian explorer who was the first person to discover New Zealand, according to Māori oral history. It is likely that Kupe existed historically, but this is difficult to confirm. The idea of a Great Fleet led by Kupe and carrying Polynesians to settle in New Zealand, an idea that used to be taught in schools in much of the 20th century, is now considered to be untrue.

=== Serbia ===
The Kosovo Myth is a Serbian national myth based on legends about events related to the Battle of Kosovo (1389). It has been a subject in Serbian folklore and literary tradition and has been cultivated oral epic poetry and guslar poems. The legend evolved from different originators into various versions. In its modern form it emerged in 19th-century Serbia and served as an important constitutive element of the national identity of modern Serbia and its politics.

=== Singapore ===
The arrival of Stamford Raffles and the signing of the 1819 Singapore Treaty with Hussein Shah of Johor and Temenggong Abdul Rahman serve as a central founding narrative in Singapore. Following independence in 1965, state narratives commonly framed the establishment of a British trading post in 1819 as the beginning of modern Singapore, emphasising its transformation from a small settlement into a global port. Adopting 1819 as a shared starting point helped foster a common civic identity among Singapore's multi-ethnic population, distinct from earlier regional histories tied to previous kingdoms as far back to the settlement of Temasek during the 13th century. In recent decades, particularly during the 200th anniversary in 2019, official accounts have broadened this narrative to place the 1819 treaty within a longer historical timeline of over 700 years.

=== United States ===
Several national myths have shaped American identity and collective memory.

==== American exceptionalism ====
American exceptionalism is the belief that the United States is fundamentally different and morally superior to other nations, often described as a "shining city on a hill." This myth emphasizes democracy, freedom, and a unique national mission. Critics argue it can obscure inequalities and justify interventionist policies.

==== Manifest Destiny frontier myth ====
The American frontier (also known as the Old West or Wild West) is a theme in American mythology that defines the American national identity as brave pioneers who discovered, conquered, and settled the vast wilderness. It affirms individualism, informality, and pragmatism as American values. Richard Slotkin describes this myth as depicting "America as a wide-open land of unlimited opportunity for the strong, ambitious, self-reliant individual to thrust his way to the top." Cowboys, gunfighters, and farmers are commonly appearing archetypes in this myth. The American frontier produced various mythologized figures such as Wild Bill Hickok, Johnny Appleseed, Paul Bunyan, Wyatt Earp, Billy the Kid, Annie Oakley, Doc Holliday, Butch Cassidy, and Davy Crockett. The mythology surrounding the American frontier is immortalized in the Western genre of fiction, particularly Western films and literature.

==== Thanksgiving origin myth ====
The story of the "first Thanksgiving" in 1621 presents a narrative of peaceful cooperation between Pilgrims and Native Americans. Historians note that this account is heavily mythologized, omitting complex colonial interactions and conflicts with Indigenous peoples.

==== Lost Cause of the Confederacy ====
The Lost Cause of the Confederacy is a revisionist historical myth that emerged in the post-Civil War United States, particularly in the late 19th and early 20th centuries. It portrays the Confederate cause as noble, framing the Southern war effort as a defense of states' rights and Southern culture rather than a struggle to preserve slavery. This narrative emphasizes the heroism of Confederate leaders, the bravery of soldiers, and the moral superiority of the Southern way of life.

The Lost Cause myth includes the idea that the South was overwhelmed by the North's superior resources rather than defeated due to its defense of slavery. It often romanticizes plantation life and underplays the centrality of slavery and racial oppression. Organizations such as the United Daughters of the Confederacy and Confederate memorial associations played key roles in promoting this narrative through textbooks, monuments, and ceremonies, embedding it into Southern memory and education.

The myth has had lasting social and political effects, shaping attitudes toward race, segregation, and civil rights. It contributed to the justification of Jim Crow laws and the suppression of African American civil rights, and it continues to influence debates over Confederate monuments and symbols in the United States.

==== Other systemic myths ====
Richard T. Hughes identifies overarching myths, such as the "Chosen Nation," "Christian Nation," and "Innocent Nation," which shape U.S. identity and rationalize social hierarchies. These myths convey divine favor, moral mission, and national innocence, influencing political ideology and cultural narratives.

== See also ==
- Anzac spirit
- Civil religion
- Euromyth
- Folk epics
- Founding myth
- Imagined community
- Nationalism and archaeology
- Nationalist historiography
- Nationalization of history
- Mythomoteur
- Nation branding
- National epic
- National monument
- National mysticism
- Noble lie
- Political myth
- Primordialism
- Ernest Renan
- What is a Nation?
