= Kosovo Myth =

Serbian nation-building myth

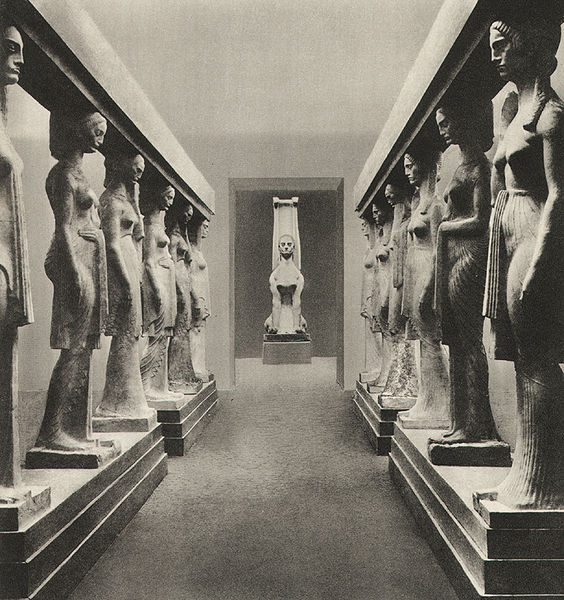
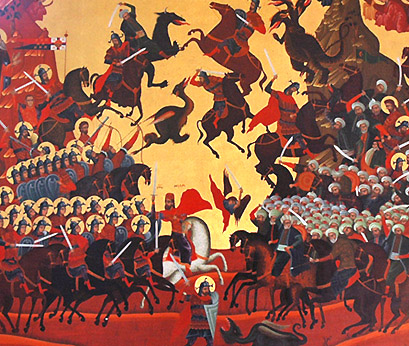
Left: The proposed Vidovdan Temple by Ivan Meštrović
Right: The Battle of Kosovo, Serbian Orthodox Church's icon

The Kosovo Myth, also known as the Kosovo Cult and the Kosovo Legend, (Note: Serbian: Косовски мит, romanized: Kosovski mit; Косовски култ, Kosovski kult; Косовска легенда, Kosovska legenda) is a Serbian national myth based on legends about events related to the Battle of Kosovo (1389). It is rooted in Prince Lazar's apocryphal choice during the battle at the Kosovo Polje, where he is said to have rejected an earthly victory over the Ottoman Sultan Murad I and chose to die as a Christian martyr in favor of a "heavenly kingdom". This choice, as the narrative suggests, was intended to position Serbs as a chosen people and secure a spiritual covenant with God and a place in the Kingdom of Heaven.

It has been a major subject in Serbian folklore and literary tradition and has been cultivated through oral epic poetry and guslar poems. The final form of the legend was not created immediately after the battle but evolved from different originators into various versions. In its modern form it emerged in 19th-century Serbia and served as an important constitutive element of the national identity of modern Serbia and its politics.

In the myth, as opposed to what actually happened in reality, Vuk Branković withdrew his troops at crucial moments, thus becoming a symbol of a betrayal, while Miloš Obilić assassinated Murad I and then was executed. In fact, Branković fought valiantly to the end.

In Ottoman Serbia, the myth was interpreted as a fatalistic ideological acceptance of the Ottoman Empire and originally was not linked to the Serbs as a people, but to the downfall of Serbian feudal society. In the modern narratives of the myth, defeat in battle was characterized as the downfall of the glorious medieval Serbian state and subsequent long-lasting Ottoman occupation and slavery. According to legend the sacrifice of Prince Lazar and his knights resulted in the defeat, while the Serbs were presented as the chosen people who signed a Covenant with God. The Kosovo Myth is modeled on well-known Christian symbols, such as the biblical Last Supper, Judas' betrayal of Jesus, and numbers that have religious associations. It pictures Serbia as essentially a variant of the Antemurale Christianitatis motif as a bulwark of Christendom against the Ottoman Empire.

One of the earliest records that contributed to the cult of Lazar's martyrdom was found in the Serbian Orthodox Church, primarily written by Danilo III, Serbian Patriarch (1390–1396) and nun Jefimija. Over the following centuries, many writers and chroniclers wrote down oral legends they heard in the Balkans. In 1601, Ragusan chronicler Mavro Orbini published the Kingdom of the Slavs, which was important for the reconstruction and development of the myth, combining the records of historians and folk legends, while the Tronoša Chronicle (1791) also significantly contributed to the preservation of the legend. The development of myth was also influenced by French chanson de geste. The final form of the Kosovo Myth was constructed by philologist Vuk Karadžić, who published the "Kosovo Cycle" after collecting traditional epic poems.

Many South Slavic literary and visual artists were influenced by Kosovo legends, including some highly internationally recognized. The most significant ones who have perpetuated the Kosovo Myth are the metropolitan and poet Petar II Petrović-Njegoš with his epic drama The Mountain Wreath (1847) and the sculptor Ivan Meštrović, while one of the main artistic representation is the painting Kosovo Maiden (1919) by Uroš Predić. Since its establishment, the myth and its poetic, literary, religious, and philosophical exposition was intertwined with political and ideological agendas. It became a central myth of Serbian nationalism used in the 19th century, and its importance was especially raised since the Congress of Berlin (1878). The myth was widely promulgated in Montenegro as well and it served advocates of Pan-Slavism and Yugoslavism before the creation of Yugoslavia in early 20th century.

It was evoked at times of major historic events such as the assassination of Archduke Franz Ferdinand of Austria, World War I, creation of Yugoslavia, and the Yugoslav coup d'état. The myth portrays Kosovo as the spiritual and cultural heart of Serbia, with the narrative having historically been used to emphasize Serbian identity and claims to the region. As such, the myth has been invoked in Serbian nationalism to justify opposition to Kosovo's independence, and was especially used to bolster a Serbian victimization narrative during the rise of Serbian nationalism in the 1980s, the breakup of Yugoslavia, and Kosovo War.

== Overview ==
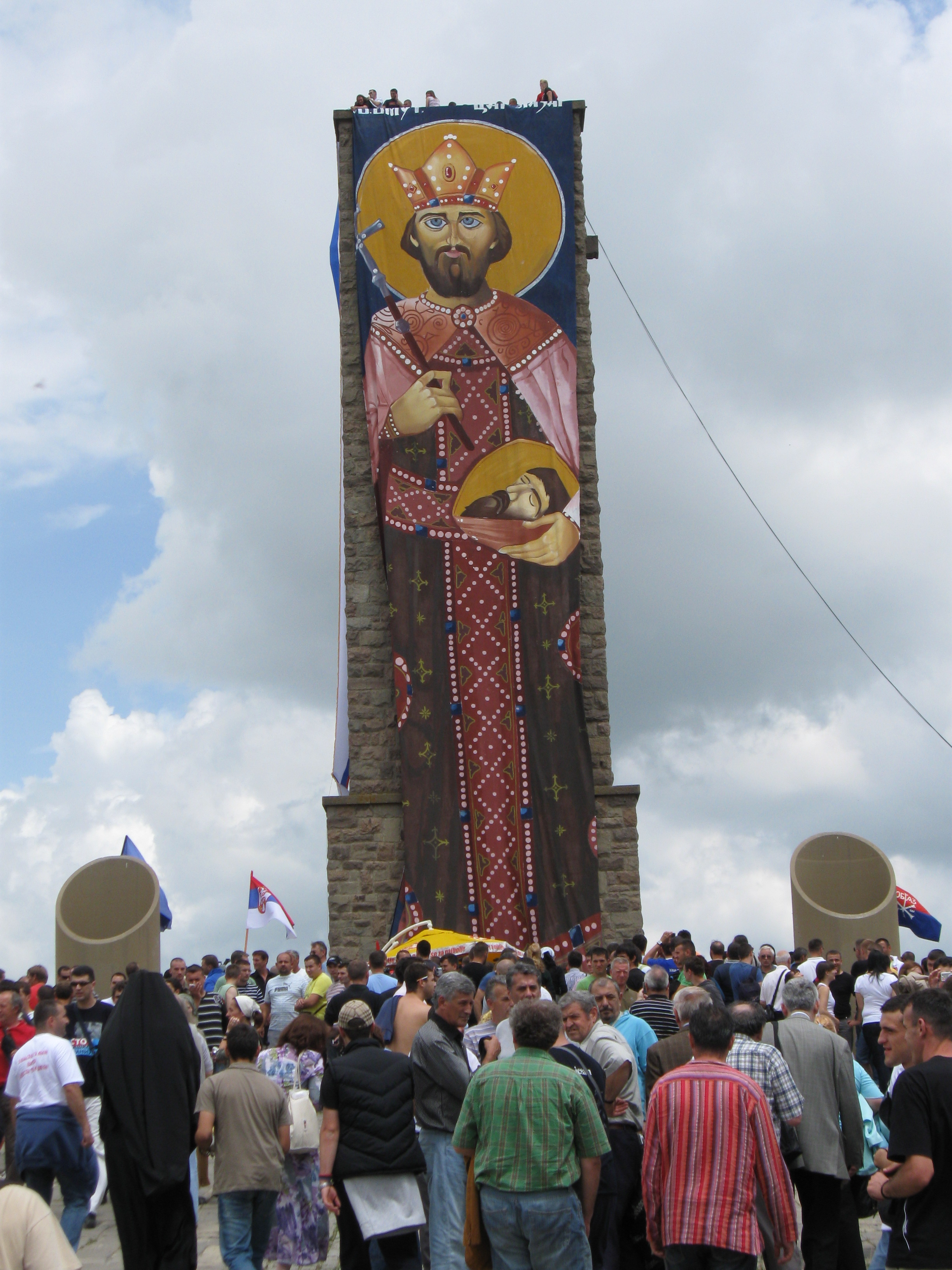
The Gazimestan memorial site commemorating the Battle of Kosovo covered by an image of Lazar of Serbia

The central events in the myth are related to the Battle of Kosovo that took place in 1389, about which numerous details are not actually known. According to legend, the Serbian ruler Prince Lazar, who was referred to as Tsar ("Emperor") Lazar, was offered an ultimatum to pay homage to the Ottoman sultan Murad I, leaving the control of Serbian lands to the sultan and taxation, or to lead his army into the battle on the Kosovo Polje. On the last supper before the battle hosted by Lazar, he told his knights that one of them would betray him. Deceived by his son-in-law Vuk Branković, he accused Miloš Obilić, which Obilić opposed, claiming that he would kill Murаd I.

Per legend, Lazar was visited the night before battle by a grey hawk or falcon from Jerusalem who offered a choice between an "earthly kingdom", implying victory at the Battle, or the Kingdom of Heaven, where the Serbs would be defeated. It is sometimes said that the biblical prophet Elijah appeared in the form of a falcon. Lazar chose to die as a Christian martyr, thus achieving a special status for Serbs as a heavenly people. The warriors accepted his words, stating that the Serbs would get freedom in heaven, but that they would never be enslaved. Lazar also cursed those Serbs who refuse to join him on the battlefield. He and the Serbian army received communion in the Church of St. John the Baptist in Samodreža.

The battle took place on the Christian St. Vitus Day, known in Serbia as Vidovdan. After an agreement with the Ottoman sultan, in order to preserve his positions, Vuk Branković withdrew his troops at crucial moments of the battle, thus becoming symbol of a betrayal. Pretending to surrender after the abandon of Lazar, Obilić came to the sultan's tent and after kneeling to allegedly kiss Murad's feet, took out a dagger and mortally wounded him. The dying sultan ordered Obilić's execution, while this sacrifice showed his loyalty to Lazar and heroism. Defeat in battle was characterized as the downfall of the glorious medieval Serbian state and subsequent long-lasting Ottoman occupation and slavery. In Serbian tradition, the red color of the Paeonia peregrina has become a symbol of "bloodshed in the Battle of Kosovo".

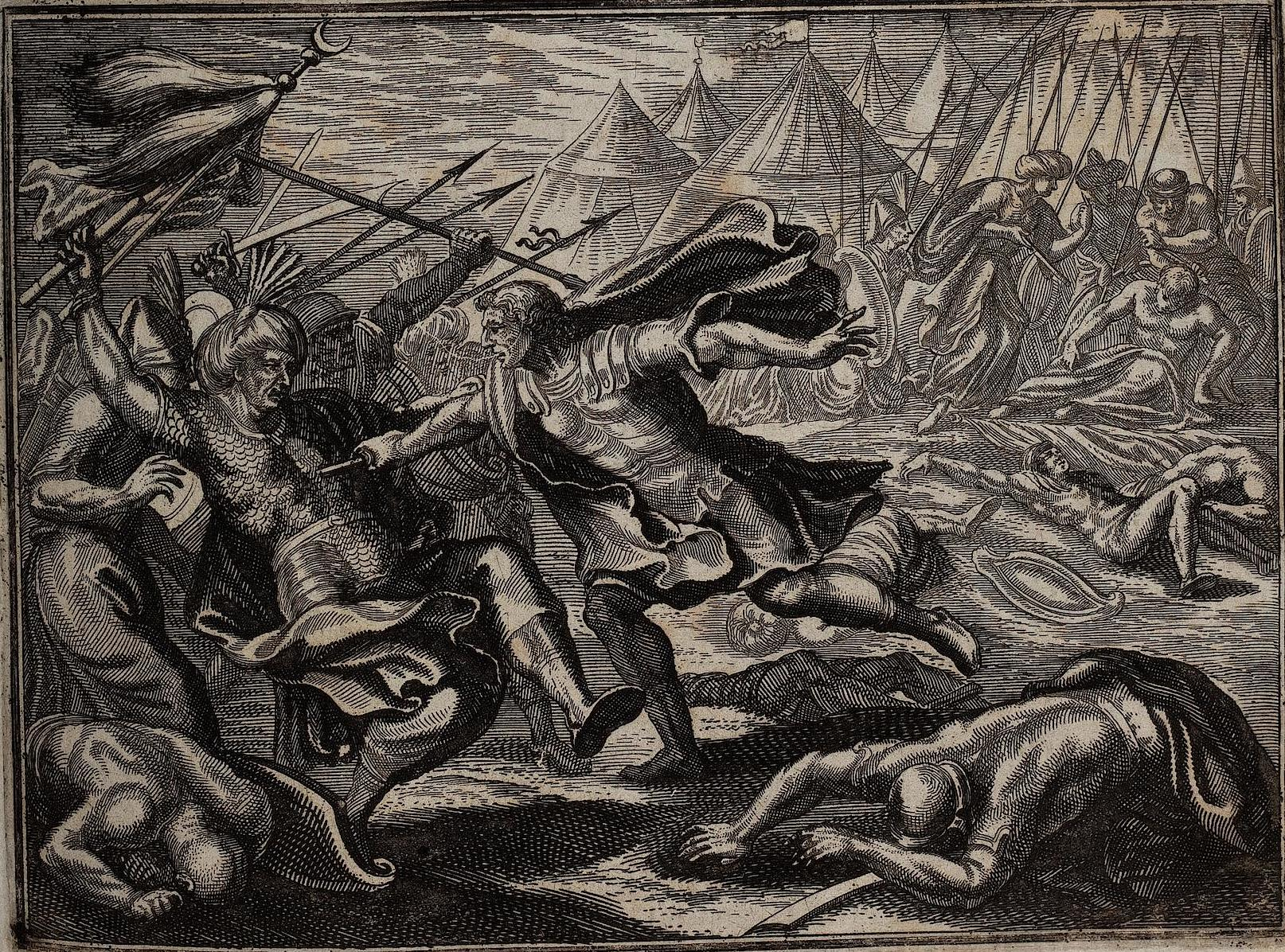
Miloš Obilić assassinated Murad I; illustration from the German version of the Present State of the Ottoman Empire (1694) by Paul Rycaut.

On the other hand, Lazar was captured by the Ottoman Turks and beheaded. The sacrifice of Lazar and his knights for the sake of the Kingdom of Heaven resulted in the defeat of the Serbian army by the Turks, while the Serbs were presented as the chosen people who signed a Covenant with God. Other famous knights who according to legends participated were Milan Toplica, Ivan Kosančić, Pavle Orlović, Stevo Vasojević, and the Musić brothers. There are also key female characters in the Kosovo Myth, who symbolize the great losses and isolation in which Serbs, especially women, lived during Ottoman rule. Princess Milica, who was referred to as Tsaritsa ("Empress") Milica, was Lazar's wife and member of the Nemanjić dynasty. She begged Lazar to keep his youngest brother Boško so that one of the nine Jugović brothers would surely survive, which Boško himself refused and then became a flag-bearer during the battle. Their mother died of a broken heart after losing all nine sons in battle. Another female character is a Kosovo Maiden, a girl who came to Kosovo Polje the morning after the battle and cared for the wounded Serbian warriors, giving them water and wine.

Also, birds often appear in the legend, which should symbolize the connection between the earth and the heaven. Ravens can speak and play the role of messengers, and so can swallows. The mother of nine Jugović asked God for "eyes of a falcon, white wings of a swan" which was fulfilled for her, so she could fly over the battlefield and see her sons and husband fighting. Then, the raven gave her a confirmation of the death of her family members. In addition to the transformation of Elijah, the falcon represented warriors. Contrary to common symbols, doves were called cowardly and weak enemies, and eagles were depicted as scavengers the flesh of the victims.

=== Basic elements ===
Ljubinka Trgovčević described the elements and symbolism of the myth:

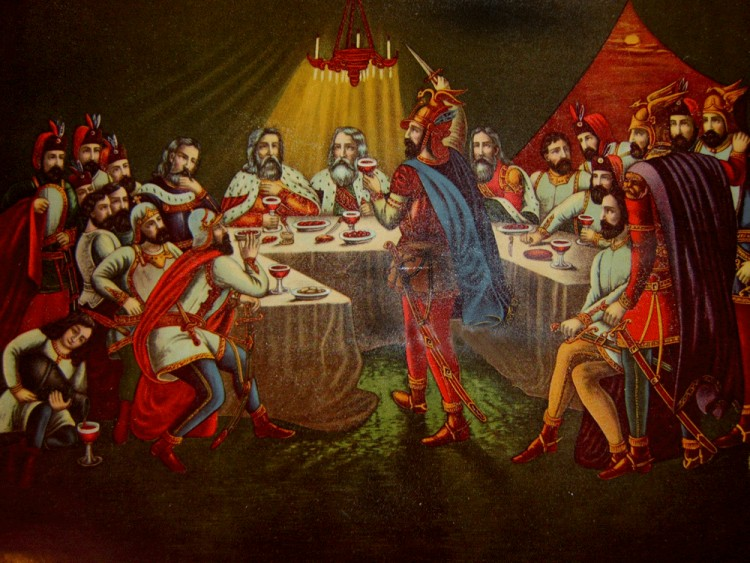
Prince's Supper (1871) by Adam Stefanović and Pavle Čortanović; many parts of the myth are modeled on well-known Christian symbols, such as the Last Supper and Judas' betrayal.

- Vengeance – to restore the medieval Serbian Kingdom on the territories where it once existed
- Martyrdom – to sacrifice for the freedom and faith of the Serbs
- Betrayal – justifies defeat and warns those who do not support the Serbian cause, such as Vuk Branković
- Glory – those who sacrifice themselves are promised "the Kingdom of Heaven" and eternal glory, such as Lazar and Miloš Obilić

Many parts and characters in the myth are modeled on well-known Christian symbols. While Lazar is portrayed as Jesus and faith, the dinner that he headed the night before the battle has the attributes of the biblical Last Supper, including the presence of his disciples and Vuk Branković, the traitor or Judas figure. Like Jesus, Lazar died so that his people could live. Also, numbers that have religious associations such as Twelve Apostles and Trinity are often used in the legend.

The Kosovo Myth presents the battle as "a titanic contest between Christian Europe and the Islamic East" in which Lazar renounced "the earthly kingdom for a heavenly one". The Kosovo Myth pictures Serbia as Antemurale Christianitatis (Bulwark of Christianity), similarly to constructions of the other nations in the Balkans. It is sometimes propagated to evoke a sense of pride and national grievance among Serbs. Since the battle on Kosovo Polje, this hill came to be seen as the "cradle of Serbia" and one of the most Serb nation's most holy places. Sabrina P. Ramet compared the myths about Prince Lazar with the myths about the knighthood of the King Arthur and the martyrdom of Olaf II of Norway, as well as the legends about Stephen I of Hungary. Gerlachlus Duijzings noted that, in a similar way, Naim Frashëri tried through Bektashism to promote the Battle of Karbala myth among Albanians as a source of inspiration in their struggle against Ottoman domination, although that myth has a similar contest and style as the Serbian-Orthodox Kosovo Myth.

== Sources and development ==
The Kosovo Myth has for a long time been a central subject in Serbian folklore and Serbian literary tradition, and for centuries was cultivated mostly in the form of oral epic poetry and guslar poems. The mythologization of the battle occurred shortly after the event. The legend was not fully formed immediately after the battle but evolved from different originators into various versions. Many sources from 14th to 18th century have preserved oral narration of the Kosovo Battle, such as chronicles, genealogies, annals, religious cult texts and travellers' tales. Epic poetry was well developed among Serbs and represented a cultural source of pride, identity and a strong connection to the past. One of the earliest records that contributed to the development of the cult of martyrdom and God's special favor for Lazar are the Narration about Prince Lazar by Danilo III, Serbian Patriarch (1390–1396), and the Encomium of Prince Lazar by a nun Jefimija, a widow of the despot Uglješa Mrnjavčević.

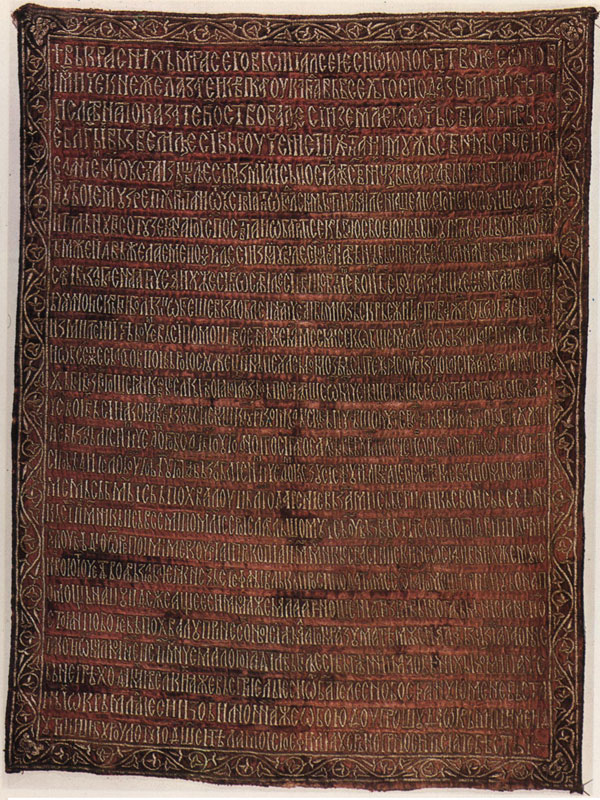
The Encomium of Prince Lazar (14th century) by Jefimija

The first Serbian record of the assassination of the Ottoman Sultan Murad I was the Life of Despot Stefan Lazarević by Constantine of Kostenets, although the name of the executor was not mentioned. The heroic image of the Battle of Kosovo and the cult of Lazar's martyrdom has lost its force over time. The epic expression of the Battle was cultivated in the emigration of Serbs to the mountainous regions of Old Serbia, Montenegro and Herzegovina. Following the Fall of Constantinople (1453), three thousand Serbs began a nomadic life. In these regions, the image of the Kosovo hero was cultivated and preserved. The figure of Murad's assassin probably originated in the culture of exile, where his heroic deed could inspire constant resistance to the Turks. The Byzantine historians from the 15th century, Doukas and Laonikos Chalkokondyles also wrote about the Battle and about "sacrifice of a Christian nobleman who killed the Sultan in his tent". Serbian soldier and author of a memoir Konstantin Mihailović was the first to mention the name of Miloš Obilić in his work the Memoirs of a Janissary (ca. 1497), while he also described the betrayal of Vuk Branković. An anonymous resident of Dubrovnik or Dalmatia translated Doukas' parts about the Battle of Kosovo, citing the moment of the betrayal, but attributed it to Dragoslav Pribišić. Italian literature and popular poetry in Republic of Ragusa influenced educated Serbian exiles to produce the first bugarštice based on the accumulation of oral history in the late 15th century. Some of the bugarštice cultivated the Kosovo Legend.

According to Miodrag Popović, in the Ottoman Serbia of the 16th and 17th century, the local population was "Turkophilic" in accordance with the general climate of necessary adaptation to Ottoman rule. Тhey did not give the legend of the Battle of Kosovo an interpretation unfavorable or hostile to the Ottoman Turks. During the 16th century, Benedikt Kuripečič wrote a travel description of the Balkans and recorded the legends he heard, including Lazar's Last Supper and Obilić's heroism. The Illustrated Chronicle of Ivan the Terrible (1567) contains nine miniatures about the events from the Kosovo legends, mostly related to the battle. In 1601, Ragusan chronicler Mavro Orbini published the Kingdom of the Slavs in Italian, which was important for the reconstruction and development of the myth, combining the records of historians and folk legends.

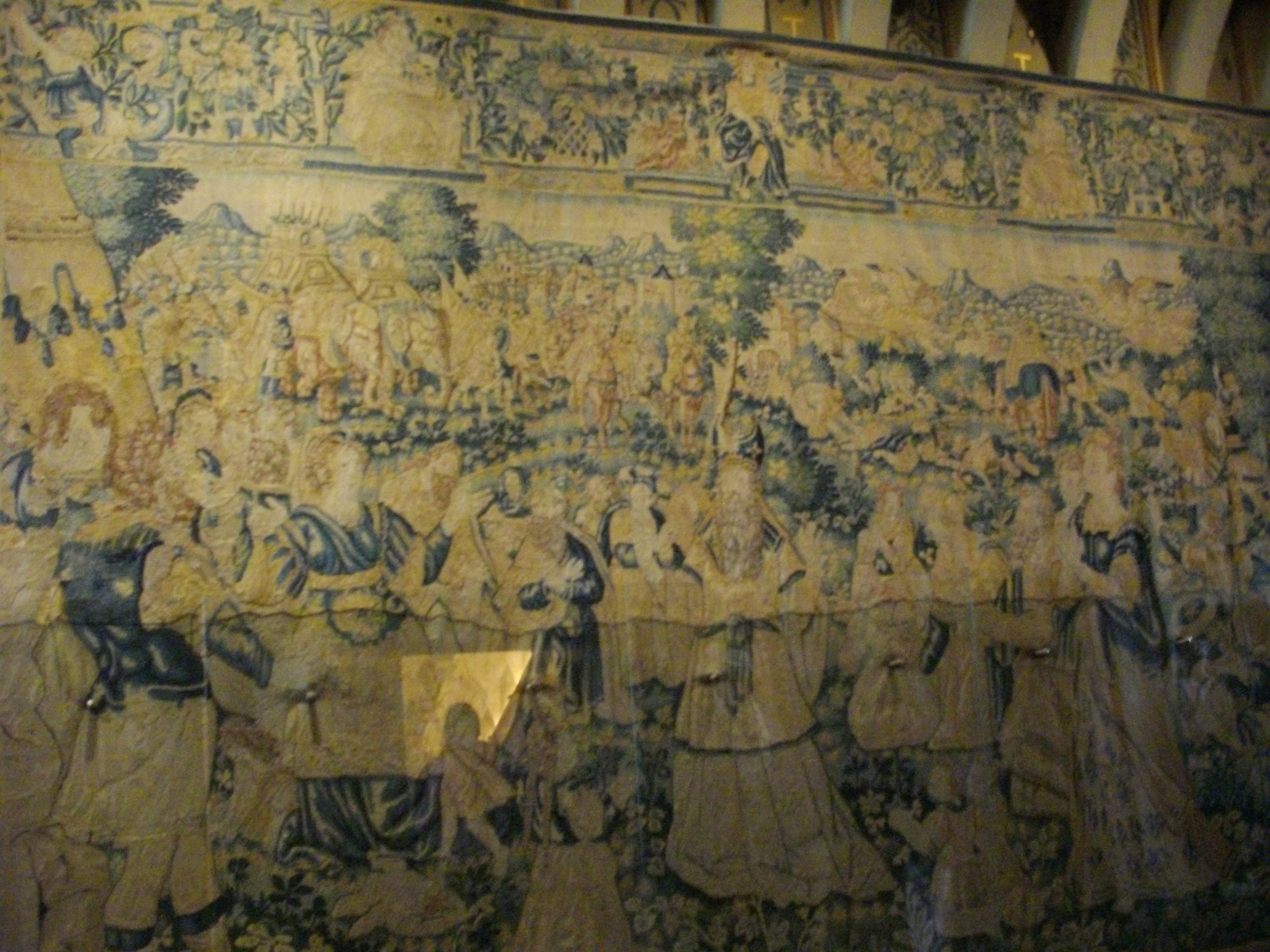
Renaissance tapestry with motifs of the Battle of Kosovo (16th century) in the Château de Chenonceau, France. The development of myth structure was also influenced by French chanson de geste.

In the following period, many stories were published by anonymous authors in Ragusa and Bay of Kotor, the most significant and most comprehensive was the Life of Prince Lazar, also known as the Tale of the Battle of Kosovo, from the beginning of the 18th century. At the request of Peter the Great, Russian Emperor, a diplomat Sava Vladislavich translated the Orbini's Kingdom of the Slavs into Russian in 1722. In the middle of the 18th century, under the influence of previous manuscripts, the Tronoša Chronicle (1791) was compiled which contributed to the further preservation of the Kosovo legend. Characters of the myth have been also recorded in the works of Đorđe Branković, Vasilije Petrović and Pavle Julinac.

During the 18th century, anti-Ottoman sentiments increased, and more comprehensive Kosovo legend became an integral part of the oral tradition. During the First Serbian Uprising (1804–1813), a fresco of Miloš as a haloed, sword-bearing saint was painted in Lazar's narthex in the Hilandar Monastery on Mount Athos, Greece. Philologist Vuk Karadžić collected traditional epic poems related to the topic of the Battle of Kosovo and released the so-called "Kosovo Cycle", which became the final version of the transformation of the myth. Karadžić's work was influenced by Jernej Kopitar, who introduced him to the literature of Romantic nationalism, as well as by Jacob Grimm, who became his reviewer and translator. Kopitar's ideology was rooted in Herder's view that each group possesses a unique culture that manifests itself through the language and tradition of the common people. Karadžić mostly published oral songs, with special reference to the heroic deeds of Prince Marko and the Kosovo Battle-related events, just like the singers sang without changes or additions. He collected most of the poems about Lazar near the monasteries on Fruška Gora, mostly because the seat of the Serbian Orthodox Church was moved there after the Great Migrations of the Serbs. The folk poems about the Kosovo legend can also be found in the collections of Avram Miletić, Ivan Franjo Jukić, Franz Miklosich, Valtazar Bogišić and Grgo Martić. The development of myth structure was also influenced by French chanson de geste.

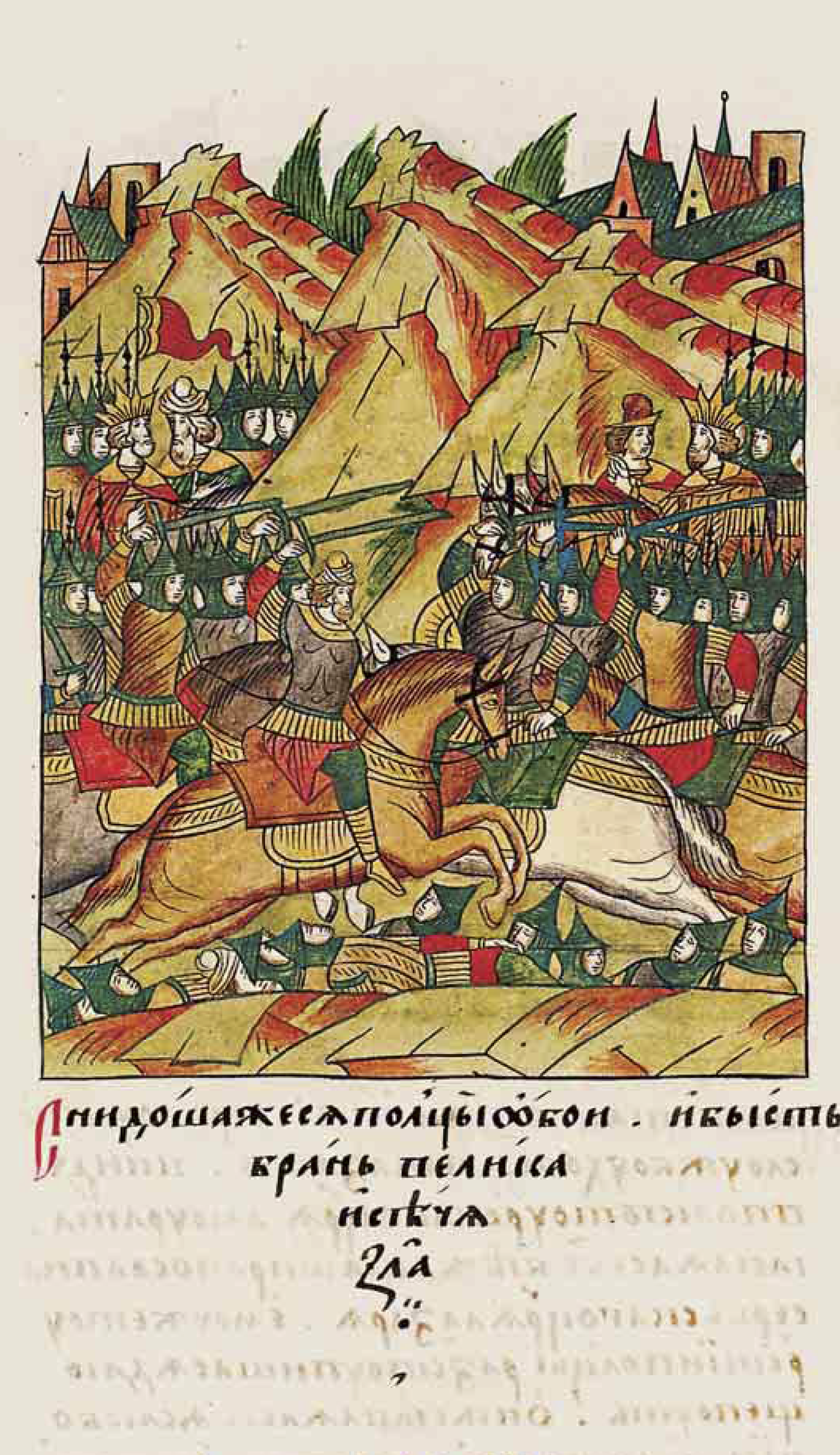
A miniature of the Battle of Kosovo, the Illustrated Chronicle of Ivan the Terrible (1567)

=== The Kosovo Cycle ===
The Kosovo Cycle consists of the following epic poems:

- Banović Strahinja (Бановић Страхиња, Banović Strahinja)
- The Prince's Curse (Клетва кнежева, Kletva kneževa)
- Tsar Lazar and Tsaritsa Milica (Цар Лазар и царица Милица, Car Lazar i carica Milica)
- The Prince's Supper (Кнежева вечера, Kneževa večera)
- Kosančić Ivan Spying the Turks (Косанчић Иван уходи Турке, Kosančić Ivan uhodi Turke)
- The Fall of the Serbian Empire (Пропаст царства српскога, Propast carstva srpskoga)
- The Three Good Heroes (Три добра јунака, Tri dobra junaka)
- Musić Stefan (Мусић Стеван, Musić Stevan)
- Tsaritsa Milica and Duke Vladeta (Царица Милица и Владета војвода, Carica Milica i Vladeta vojvoda)
- Servant Milutin (Слуга Милутин, Sluga Milutin)
- The Death of Miloš Dragilović (Obilić) (Смрт Милоша Драгиловића (Обилића), Smrt Miloša Dragilovića (Obilića))
- Kosovo Maiden (Косовка девојка, Kosovka devojka)
- The Death of Jugovićs' Mother (Смрт мајке Југовића, Smrt majke Jugovića)
- Prince Marko and the Eagle (Марко Краљевић и орао, Marko Kraljević i orao)

=== Interpretation ===
The scale of interpretations of the Kosovo Myth is undeniably one of the richest. It can be interpreted as "democratic, anti-feudal, with a love for justice and social equality". The myth never referred in those early versions to the "destiny of Serbs as a nation", but to the collapse of Serbian feudal society and its rulers. The myth can be interpreted in different ways in connection with other myths like: myth of military valor, myth of victimhood, myth of salvation and myth of chosen people. It is a myth of Golden Age and Fall. Since its late 19th century ideological construction, the Kosovo myth describes Kosovo as the metaphorical cradle of the Serb nation, and the Serbs as a chosen people. The Kosovo myth is incorporated into the Serb national identity's multifaceted mythomoteur. Military defeat in the Kosovo Battle was portrayed as a moral victory. The centrality of the Kosovo Myth was one of the main causes for merging ethnic and Orthodox Christian religious identity of Serbs. The division of earthly and heavenly power and the choice of the latter by Lazar was meant by the church as a tool of legitimization of Ottoman power among Orthodox Slavs, while at the same time the myth enforced the primacy of the Serbian Orthodox Church over religious affairs. Albanian nationalism in Kosovo has its own narratives, that counter with the Serb Kosovo myth.

== Historical basis ==
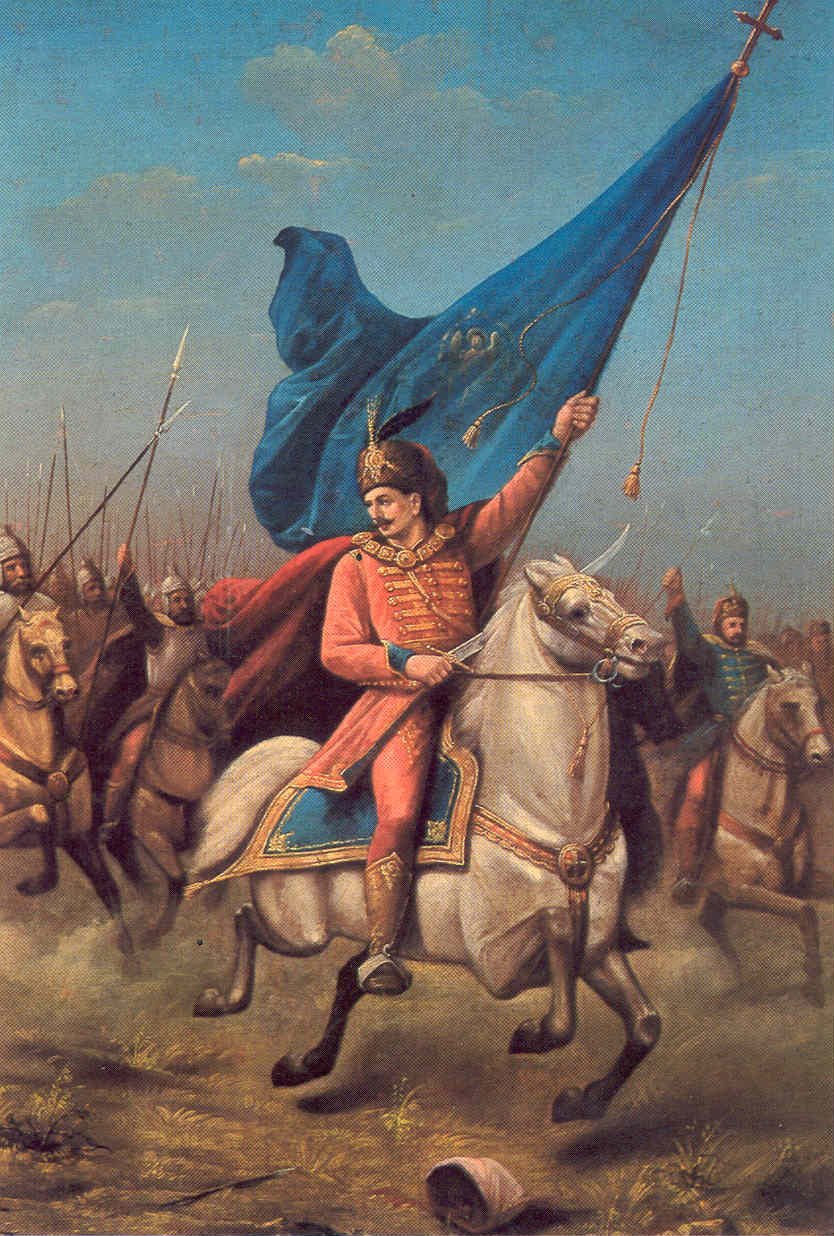
Boško Jugović (19th century) by Đorđe Putnik, one of the mythological Jugović brothers and flag-bearer during the battle

The lack of eyewitnesses accounts of the battle and the early development of the legend made it difficult to comprehend the facts related to the Battle of Kosovo. What is reliably known are the journey of the Turks from Plovdiv to Gazimestan, the time and place of the event, as well as the deaths of both rulers. Lazar's Christian coalition also included the unit of the King of Bosnia Tvrtko I, as well as Albanian, Bulgarian, Croatian, Czech, Greek, Hungarian, Frankish, and Wallachian forces. The Serbian Empire began to break-up soon after the death of Stefan Dušan (1355) and it had already collapsed long before the Kosovo Battle. The outcome of the battle is not clear from the source either. There are different conclusions, but the most common are those about the Ottoman victory. Tim Judah cites the possibility of a Serbian victory, while Noel Malcolm claims that the outcome was a draw. Although Serbia's strategic fall was the Battle of Maritsa in 1371, Kosovo was the spiritual fall of Serbia and a beginning of a new era for the Serbs. The real Kosovo Battle was not as decisive as presented by the myth because the final downfall of medieval Serbian state happened 70 years after it, in 1459, when the Ottomans captured Smederevo.

Historians cannot reliably establish the identity of Murad's assassin, as well as the existence of betrayal by Vuk Branković or anyone else. There are various theories about the death of the sultan. Noel Malcolm explained that the story of the betrayal arose of confusion with the narratives related to the Second Battle of Kosovo (1448), when Đurađ Branković, Despot of Serbia and the son of Vuk Branković, refused to join John Hunyadi, Regent of Hungary, in the fight against the Ottomans. The Jugovići family and the Kosovo Maiden are fictionalized characters. Brendan Humphreys noted that the part of the story of Lazar's choice is a metaphysical narrative added to a historical event by the most religious literalist.

== In art and culture ==
In the first half of the 19th century, plays about the characters of the Kosovo Myth have been published by Serbian authors educated in the Austrian Empire, who adopted ideas combining Enlightenment rationalism and Romantic nationalism. Some of the dramas were works by Zaharije Orfelin, the Miloš Obilić (1828) by Jovan Sterija Popović, Tsar Lazar or the Fall of the Serbian Empire (1835) by Isidor Nikolić and the Miloš Obilić (1858) by Jovan Subotić. Matija Ban, a Serbian poet, dramatist, and playwright from Dubrovnik, included the motives of the Kosovo myth in the drama Tsar Lazar or the Defeat at Kosovo (1858), gradually giving them the values of Romantic nationalism.

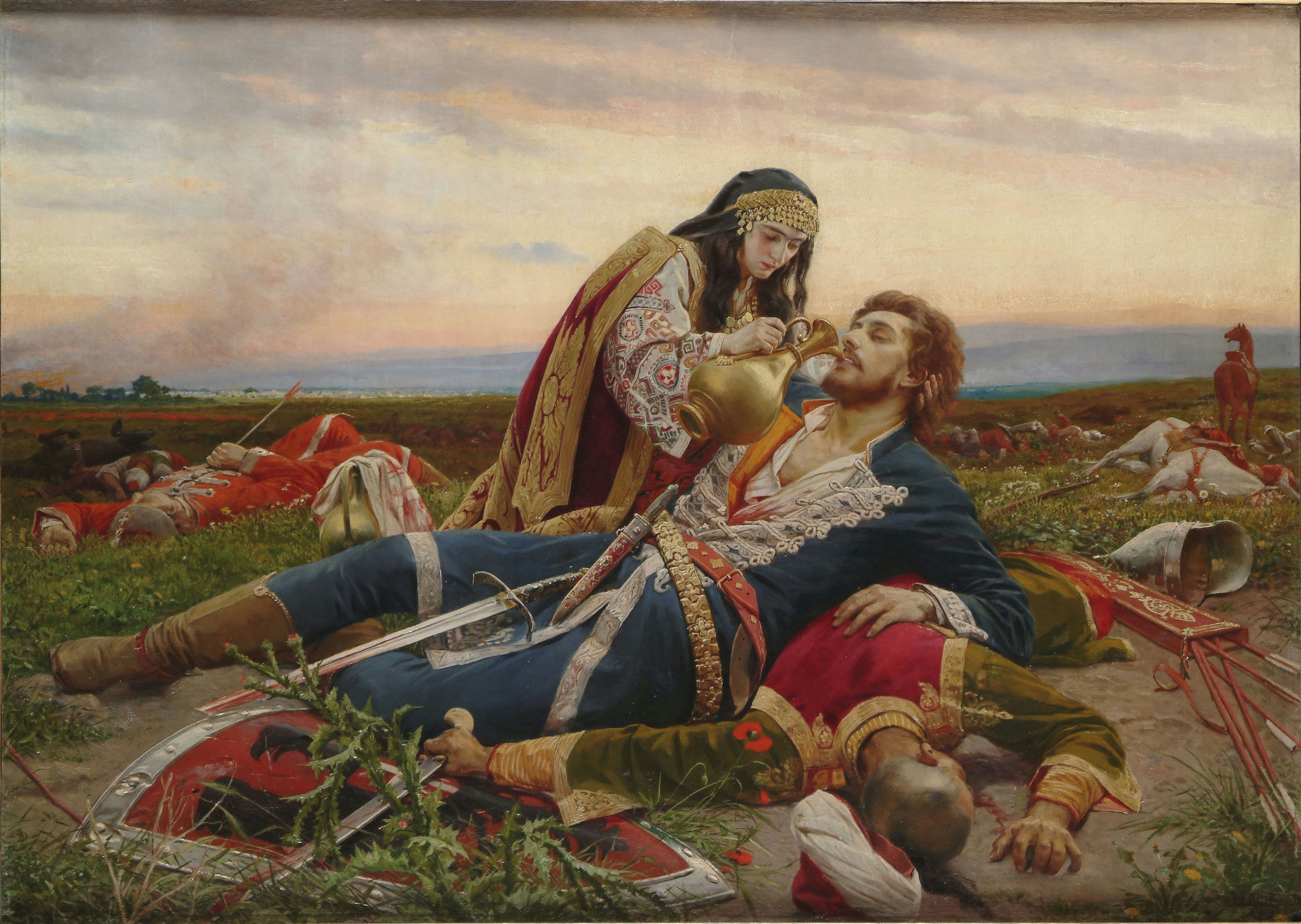
Kosovo Maiden (1919) by Uroš Predić, is one of the main artistic representation of the Kosovo Myth

The poet Petar II Petrović-Njegoš, Prince-Bishop of Montenegro (1830–1851), and his epic drama The Mountain Wreath (1847), which is considered as masterpiece and one of the most celebrated works in the South Slavic literature, represents a prominent example that glorifies the heroic ideals and spirit of the Kosovo Myth. It covers a legendary struggle to extermination against converted Muslim Slavs and Ottoman domination. Petrović-Njegoš often referred to the characters of the Kosovo Myth, cursing Vuk Branković and celebrating Miloš Obilić, and also used birds as symbols.

At the 500th anniversary of the Battle of Kosovo (1889), Franjo Rački and Tomislav Maretić, the key people of the Yugoslav Academy of Sciences and Arts in Zagreb, gave lectures on the Battle of Kosovo and epic songs dedicated to it. During the 19th century, the Serbian government financed painters such as Đorđe Krstić and Nikola Aleksić to decorate churches and monasteries with paintings and frescoes with motifs of Kosovo martyrs. Many significant Serbian painters, Adam Stefanović, Pavle Čortanović, Paja Jovanović and Anastas Jovanović, portrayed the heroes and motifs of epic poems from the Kosovo cycle, while the most prominent painting became the Kosovo Maiden (1919) by Uroš Predić. One of the most notable Serbian artists Đura Jakšić wrote and painted inspired by the Kosovo Myth.

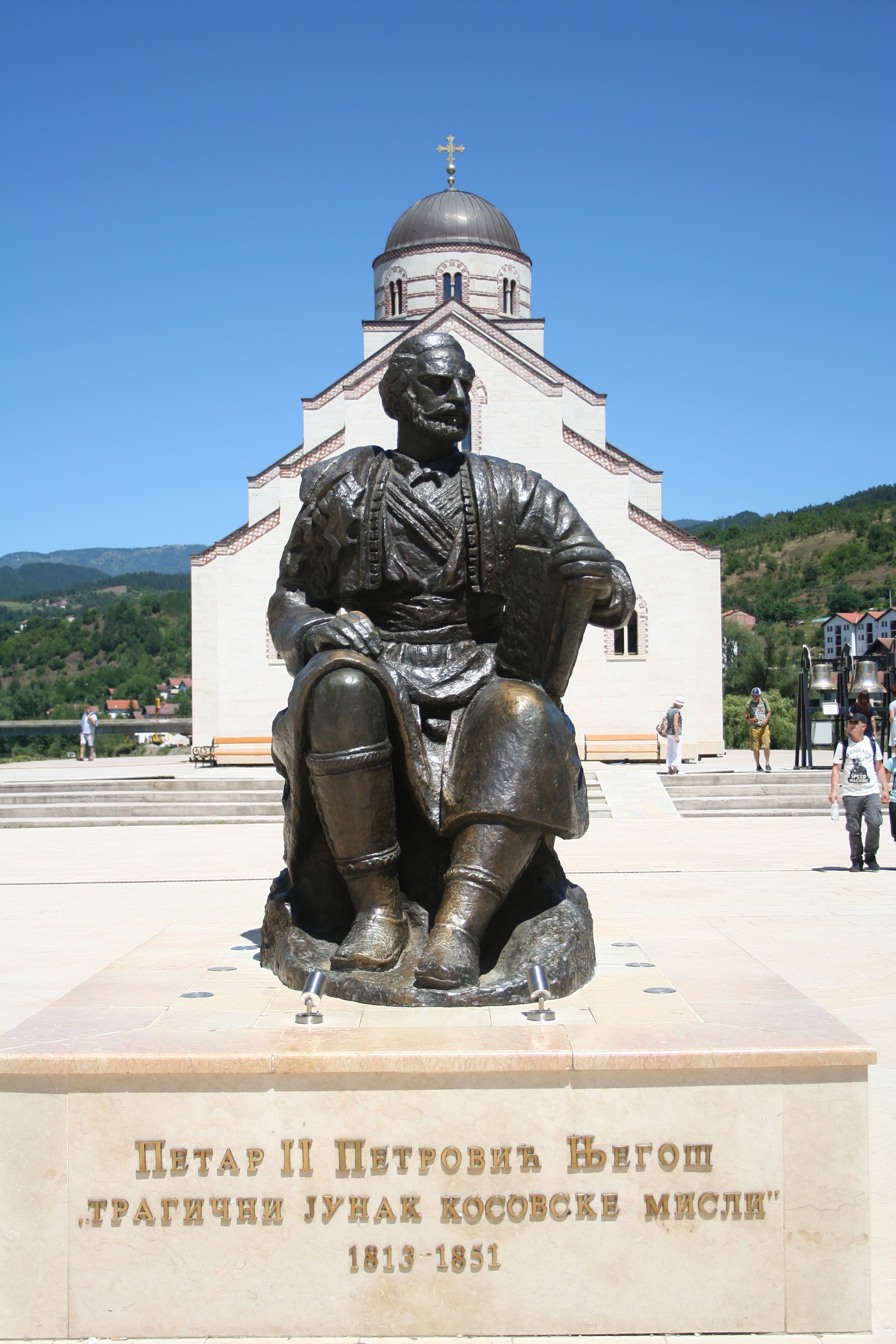
Monument to Petar II Petrović-Njegoš in Andrićgrad (Višegrad) founded by Emir Kusturica, with the Ivo Andrić's quote "Tragic hero of Kosovo thought"

In the early 20th century, several concerts and plays in the National Theatre in Belgrade were dedicated to the Battle of Kosovo and heroes. The play "Death of the Mother of the Jugović" by Ivo Vojnović, a poet and playwright from Dubrovnik, was first performed in Belgrade in 1906 and in Zagreb in 1907. The first Serbian film, The Life and Deeds of the Immortal Leader Karađorđe (1911) directed by Ilija Stanojević, which portrays Karađorđe's leadership of the First Serbian Uprising of 1804–1813, also features a famous guslar Filip Višnjić who sings about the events of the Kosovo Myth.

Croatian sculptor Ivan Meštrović contributed to the Myth when in 1907–11, he was commissioned to design the Vidovdan Temple as "the eternal ideal of heroism, loyalty and sacrifice, from which our race draws its faith and moral strength" and "collective ideal of the Serbian people". The temple's actual construction on the Field of Kosovo was postponed because of the Balkan Wars, World War I, World War II, and eventually shelved. Many of Meštrović's works dedicated to the Kosovo legends and heroes attracted much attention and were exhibited in many European cities, including in the Grafton Galleries in London and at the Venice Biennale. Croatian painter Mirko Rački, also adopted the mythos and painted numerous paintings within Kosovo cycle, including The Mother of the Jugović, Nine Jugović brothers, Kosovo Maiden and Miloš Obilić.

French translation of Serbian epic songs of the Kosovo Cycle Chants de guerre de la Serbie, étude, traductions, commentaires (1916) by Léo d'Orfer was awarded an Prix Langlois by the Académie Française. Shortly after the withdrawal of the Serbian Army through Kosovo and Albania during World War I, the poets began writing on Kosovo topics again. In 1917, Milutin Bojić published the Poems of pain and pride, a lyrical depiction of the torture of people during the war, and deeply affected by the events he wrote: "We bravely sow our new graves... O, Lord, haven't we had enough punishment... It is time to lift the gravestones". The same year, poet Milosav Jelić wrote the Serbian sequence and Rastko Petrović published the "Kosovo Sonnet". Serbian scholar and Hellenist Miloš N. Đurić explored some elements of the Kosovo Myth from the standpoint of ethics.

Works of Ivo Andrić, who won the Nobel Prize in Literature in 1961, are sometimes associated with the Kosovo Myth. He wrote an essay about Petrović Njegoš called the "Tragic hero of Kosovo thought". The martyrdom of Radisav, a character from Andrić's most famous novel The Bridge on the Drina (1945), has been described by some scholars as the reworking of Kosovo legacy and a founding myth of the Serbian nation. In 1953, the Serbian communist government hired Aleksandar Deroko to design the Gazimestan monument commemorating the Kosovo's heroes and Petar Lubarda to decorate the ceremonial hall of the Republican Executive Council with a large wall painting depicting the Battle of Kosovo.

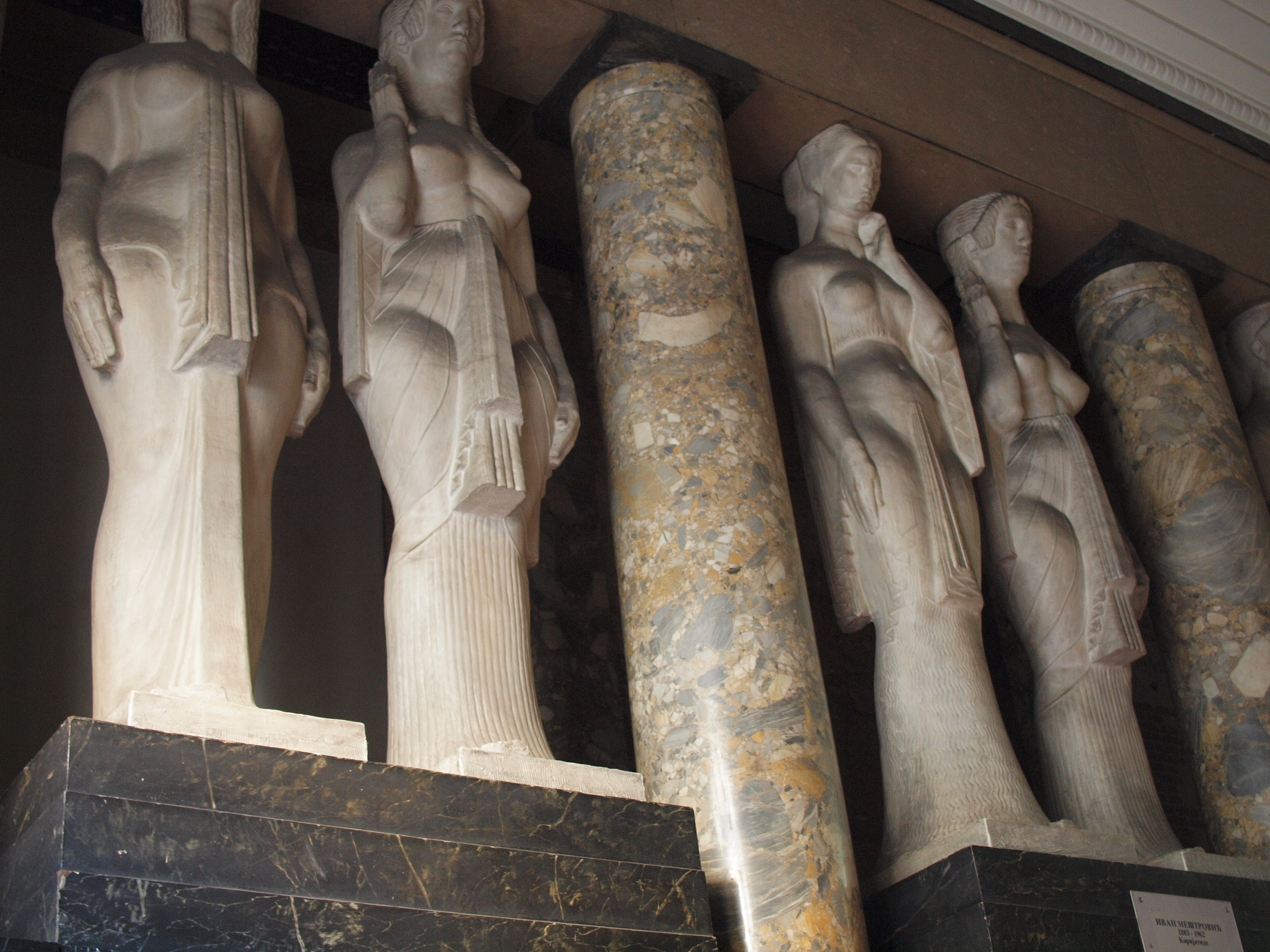
The caryatids designed by Ivan Meštrović, which were supposed to be in his proposed Vidovdan Temple, National Museum of Serbia in Belgrade.

On the occasion of the 600th anniversary (1989), the film Battle of Kosovo directed by Zdravko Šotra, based on the drama written by poet Ljubomir Simović, was released. In the same year, the poet and writer Matija Bećković coined the famous phrase "Kosovo, the most expensive Serbian word" (Kosovo, najskuplja srpska reč), while a popular folk song Vidovdan performed by Gordana Lazarević and composed by Milutin Popović Zahar was published. In his documentary the Serbian Epics (1992), the Academy Award-winning director Paweł Pawlikowski portrayed members of the Army of Republika Srpska chanting traditional epic songs about the Battle of Kosovo during the Bosnian War. The Pulitzer Prize-winning poet Charles Simic was strongly influenced by the narrative and magic realism of the Kosovo Cycle.

Although Andrićgrad, founded in Višegrad in 2014 by the two-time Palme d'Or-winning filmmaker Emir Kusturica, is named after Ivo Andrić, it is believed that its purpose is to maintain the Kosovo Myth and the Serbian national consciousness. The main church of Andrićgrad is a copy of the Visoki Dečani in Kosovo and is dedicated to the Holy Emperor Lazar and the Kosovo martyrs. After 15 years of renovation, the National Museum of Serbia in Belgrade was re-opened on Vidovdan, 28 June 2018. Among others, the museum exhibits caryatids designed by Ivan Meštrović, which were supposed to be in his proposed Vidovdan Temple.

In 2017, Russian heavy metal band Kipelov released the song "Kosovo Polye" (Kosovo Field) about "Serbia's national tragedy in the historic battle.

== Political use ==
Since its establishment, the Kosovo Myth and its poetic, literary, religious, and philosophical exposition was intertwined with political and ideological agendas. It has had a large impact on Serbian society, and has served as the most powerful Serbian cultural myth. The Myth served as an important constitutive element of the national identity of modern Serbia and its politics. Historian Sima Ćirković criticised what he called "Vidovdan mythology" on the notion that it was overshadowing the real traditions about the historical Kosovo battle, which were incorrectly labeled as "Kosovo Myth".

=== 19th and early 20th century ===
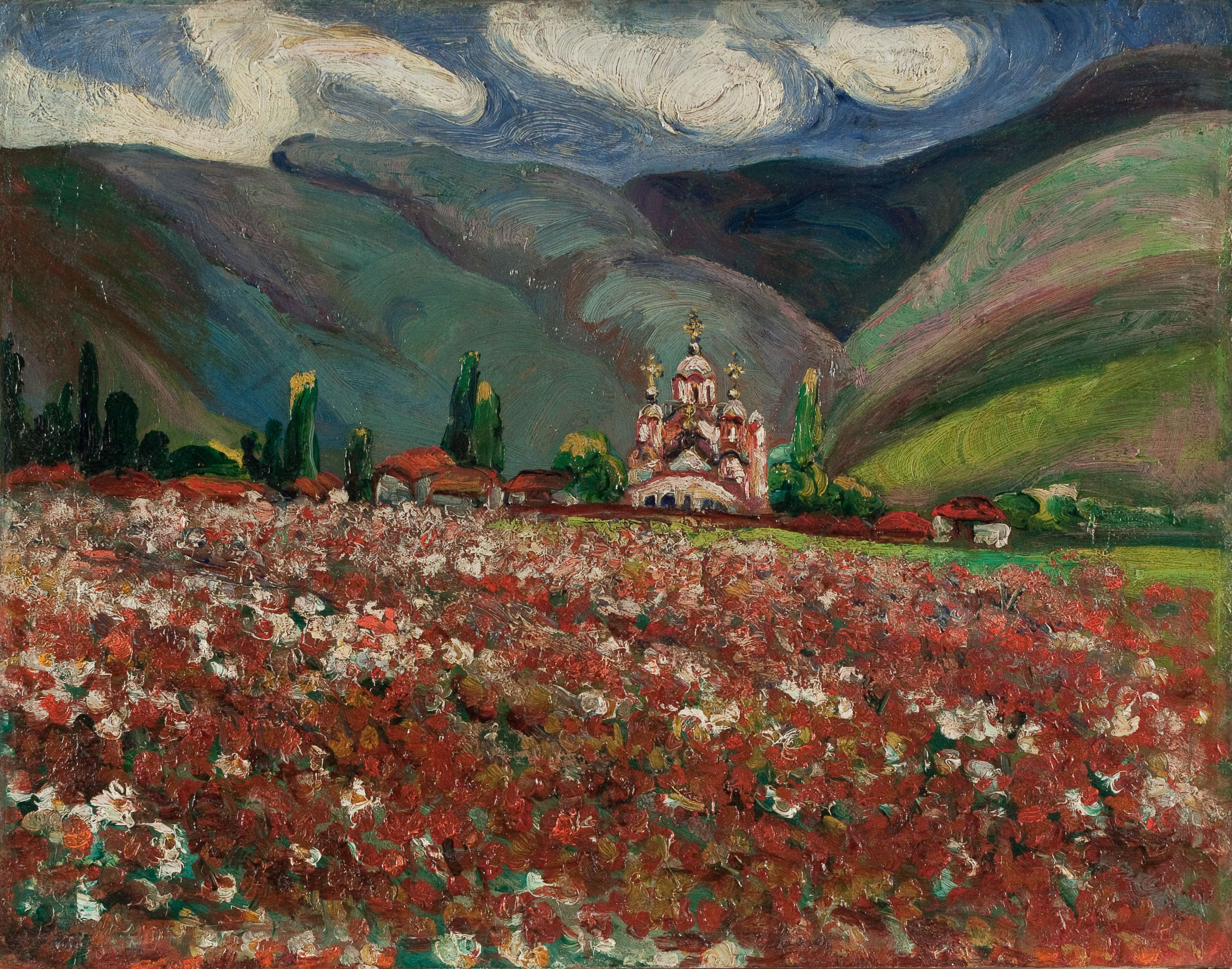
Gračanica (Kosovski božuri) (1913) by Nadežda Petrović; the red color of flowers has become a symbol of "bloodshed in the Battle of Kosovo"

The Kosovo Myth became a central myth of Serbian nationalism used in the 19th century. Like other European nationalisms, the Serbian one searched for a "glorious past" and a "golden age". Writers on nationalism often conclude the golden age with a national catastrophe.

Karađorđe, Grand Vožd of Serbia (1804–1813) and the leader of the First Serbian Uprising, declared himself the godfather of every 9th child in the family, alluding to the nine Jugović brothers. Throughout most of the 19th century it didn't carry its later importance, as the Principality of Serbia saw the region of Bosnia as its core, not Kosovo. The Congress of Berlin (1878) was the event which caused the elevation of the Kosovo myth in its modern status. The region of Bosnia was effectively handed out to Austria-Hungary and Serbian expansion towards that area was blocked, which in turn left southwards expansion towards Kosovo as the only available geopolitical alternative for the Serbian state. In the 1860s, the Kosovo myth was used as a theme to freedom and democracy among Serbia Liberals and Radicals, while the ruling Conservatives and the Court used it to compare the opposition with the "treacherous Vuk Branković". The 500th anniversary of the Battle of Kosovo (1889) was massively celebrated, with the main commemoration ceremonies in Kruševac, Lazar's former capital, and Ravanica, Lazar's burial place. One year later, Vidovdan became a state holiday.

There was a deep belief among Montenegrin people that they descended from Serb knights who fled after the battle and settled in the unreachable mountains. The Kosovo Myth was present among the people in Montenegro before the time of Petar II Petrović-Njegoš, in the form of folk legends and especially folk songs. He introduced the traditional Montenegrin cap with the aim of strengthening the presence of the Kosovo Myth in everyday life and emphasizing the direct connection with medieval Serbia. Nicholas I of Montenegro (Prince 1860–1910 and King 1910–1918) successfully used the motives of the Kosovo Myth with the aim of strengthening Montenegrin patriotism, dreaming of restoring the Serbian Empire.

The messages of the Kosovo Myth were used for the idea of Yugoslav unity. The commemoration of the 500th anniversary was also held in Croatia despite restrictions imposed by the Habsburg authorities. At the beginning of the 20th century, with the Yugoslav idea spreading, the Kosovo Myth also became a trope in common culture of Croats and Slovenes.

=== World War I and Yugoslavia ===
On Vidovdan in 1914, Gavrilo Princip, the Bosnian Serb member of Young Bosnia, assassinated Archduke Franz Ferdinand of Austria which initiated the July Crisis and led to the outbreak of World War I. Princip, Nedeljko Čabrinović and other members of the Young Bosnia were inspired by the heroism of Miloš Obilić, reenacting the Kosovo Myth. Princip knew the entire The Mountain Wreath of Njegoš.

In 1916, the Yugoslav Committee declared Vidovdan as a national holiday of Serbs, Croats and Slovenes. The Myth was used by main advocates of the Yugoslav ideology as a pan-Yugoslav myth in the Kingdom of Yugoslavia. In 1920, Vidovdan became one of the three public holidays called "St. Vitus' Day Heroes", aimg to the symbolic integration of the member of the 'nation with three names', while on 28 June 1921, the Vidovdan Constitution was adopted.

The Kosovo Myth was used by Serbian nationalists before WWI as an ideological tool in order to argue for a Serbian-led Yugoslavia instead of Yugoslavia as state of all South Slavs equally. The government moved graves of the Balkan war dead to graveyards and monuments of national creation. This was to further establish the leaders' narrative of glory, sacrifice, and the hopeful unification of Southern Slavs (Kosovo). The graves were used to uphold the narrative that many Serbians believed to be true: that the land was destined to be theirs.

The Kosovo Myth also played a role and ideologically shaped the coup d'état (27 March 1941) provoked by the Yugoslav accession to the Tripartite Pact. Serbian Patriarch Gavrilo V who strongly opposed the signing, used the motives of the Kosovo Myth in his radio speech. Milan Nedić and his puppet government of the German-occupied territory of Serbia also evoked the Myth, insisting that the Yugoslav resistance movements were direct opponents of the values and legacy of Kosovo heroes. The Ustaše used Vidovdan as an excuse for massacres during the Genocide of Serbs in the Independent State of Croatia, stating that the Serbs would start a rebellion on that holiday.

Following the SFR Yugoslavia's expulsion from the Cominform on Vidovdan in 1948, a government minister Milovan Đilas commented that the expelling resolution "cut into the minds and hearts of all us Serbs" and noted "the coincidence in dates between ancient calamities and living threats and onslaughts". Josip Broz Tito made little use of the Kosovo Cult, focusing more on self-serving heroic narrative.

=== Breakup of Yugoslavia ===
The Kosovo Myth was used to create a Serbian victimization narrative. This myth and its connection to the Serbian victim-centered position was used to legitimize reincorporation of the whole Kosovo into Serbia. The Kosovo Myth was activated and linked to the metaphors of 'genocide'. Albanians were presented by Serb writers as a treacherous and violent people who were settled in Kosovo to collaborate with Ottoman occupiers and terrorize Christian Serbs. They were at times accused of persecution and genocide of Kosovo Serbs since the Middle Ages. This portrayal included claims of a centuries-long genocide of Serbs continued in the 19th century through the forcible expulsion of up to 150,000 Serbs, and also in Tito's Yugoslavia that 'morally disqualified' Albanians to claim any control of Kosovo at the expense of Serbs. There was little statistical information to support these Serbian claims of genocide, nor was rape as frequent an occurrence there as the Serbian nationalists alleged it to be. According to David Bruce MacDonald, this style of "paranoid rhetoric" demonstrates both the perseverance and versatility of Serbian writers when faced with the reality that Serbs had not been victims of genocide in any conventional sense.

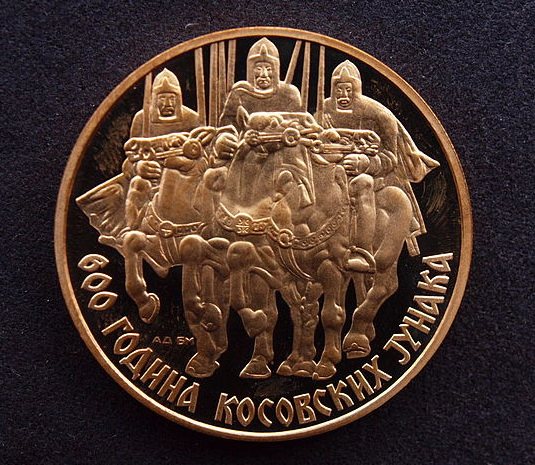
Left: Medal of Miloš Obilić, a state medal awarded by Kingdom of Serbia, Kingdom of Yugoslavia and Republic of Serbia
Right: Commemorative coin for the 600th anniversary of the Battle of Kosovo

Yugoslav Communist authorities, who downplayed the national histories of the country's communities, worked to suppress the Kosovo myth in Serbia. In the context of the Kosovo myth, Greater Serbian propagandists have produced various slogans regarding Kosovo in contemporary Serbia. The myth was used by the Milošević government and Serbian Orthodox Church to create a narrative of superior Serbdom in conflict with barbarian forces, in order to justify violent actions that were being planned at the time. This way, the myth was utilized as an ideological instrument which fueled policies that led to the Kosovo War along with other political decisions. However, the causes of the war were complex and could not be reduced to the existence of a national myth, but it was used to legitimize Milošević's reign. Leading up to the Kosovo War, the contemporary Kosovo Albanian political mythology clashed with the Kosovo Myth. During the Yugoslav wars, the Kosovo myth was prevalent, with new war commanders and politicians being compared to heroes from the battle of Kosovo, some of which were later suspected of war crimes. During the Bosnian War and Bosnian genocide, Ratko Mladić, Commander of the Army of Republika Srpska, often called Bosniaks "Turks", calling on his troops for revenge and "the Revolt against the Dahijas". The important role of the Kosovo myth in Republika Srpska is most clearly manifested in the fact that Vidovdan was declared in 1992 as an official slava (feast day) of the Bosnian Serb army, while for most of Bosnian Serbs, Ratko Mladić was considered the Lazar of modern times who with his soldiers fought the Turks.

Vidovdan was also a date that symbolized the rise and fall of Milošević, as he gave a speech in the presence of about а million people in 1989 to mark the 600th anniversary of the Battle of Kosovo, and later was arrested and extradited to the ICTY on 28 June 2001 to stand trial for charges of war crimes. Kosovo remained high on the agenda of Vojislav Koštunica, who served as the President of FR Yugoslavia (2000–2003) and Prime Minister of Serbia (2004–2008). He commented, among other things, that a new fight is being waged for control of Kosovo, this time with the United States, and that "the key question is whether force will prevail over justice in the new Battle of Kosovo".

After the election victory of the For a European Serbia coalition in 2008, they announced that they would not give up their "Kosovo orientation". Оn the anniversary of the Battle of Kosovo in 2009, Boris Tadić, President of Serbia (2004–2012), said :"Nobody can take Vidovdan from Serbia and from Serbs", but that it should not be celebrated as in 1989, which led to wars and sanctions, while Vuk Jeremić, the new Ministry of Foreign Affairs, characterized Vidovdan as a "symbol of defence of Serbian national identity".

=== Usage of the myth abroad ===
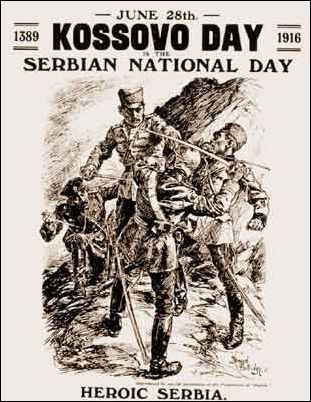
A British poster marking the celebration of "Kossovo Day" on 28 June 1916. This was done to show solidarity with their Serbian allies.

Upon Britain's entry into the First World War on 4 August 1914, the British aimed to show solidarity with their new allies, Serbia included. On 28 June, "Kossovo Day" was proclaimed in Britain, with celebrations held across the country, with "Kossovo" being an intentional reference to the famous myth. In France, folk poems concerning the Kosovo epic were published during the war while some French authors emphasized the importance of the Kosovo Myth in strengthening the "energy for revenge". In 1915, the French government ordered schools to modify their curricula to include lessons on Serbia and Serbian history, while posters in support of Serbia were pasted in Paris and London, including calls for prayer during Kossovo Day.

The pro-Serbian Kosovo Committee was established in London in 1916, headed by Elsie Inglis, and its members included Robert Seton-Watson, Arthur Evans and Charles Oman. They organized a gathering in support of Serbia in St Paul's Cathedral. Serbian historian and University of Belgrade professor Pavle Popović gave a speech at the celebration of the day in Cambridge. Seton-Watson wrote an essay about Serbia and its history, which was read in schools across Britain. Several eminent historians soon began contributing to the pro-Serbian feeling in Britain, often recalling the Kosovo Myth while doing so. Pro-Serbian events along with Kossovo Day were also held in the United States, and in a speech given by American lawyer James M. Beck, references were made to Lazar and the Battle of Kosovo.

== Sources ==
- Barna, Gábor; Povedák, István (2014). Politics, Feasts, Festivals: Yearbook of the sief working group on the ritual year. University of Szeged. ISBN 978-963-306-254-8.
- Duijzings, Gerlachlus (January 2000). Religion and the Politics of Identity in Kosovo. C. Hurst & Co. Publishers. ISBN 978-1-85065-392-9.
- Greenawalt, Alexander (2001). "Kosovo Myths: Karadžić, Njegoš, and the Transformation of Serb Memory" (PDF). Spaces of Identity. 3: 51.
- Kaufman, Stuart J. (2001). Modern Hatreds: The Symbolic Politics of Ethnic War. Cornell University Press. ISBN 978-0-8014-8736-1.
- Knudsen, Tonny Brems; Laustsen, Carsten Bagge (2006). Kosovo Between War and Peace: Nationalism, Peacebuilding and International Trusteeship. Routledge.
- Ognjenović, Gorana (2014). Politicization of Religion, the Power of Symbolism: The Case of Former Yugoslavia and its Successor States. Springer. ISBN 978-1137477897.
- Djokic, Dejan (2009). "Whose Myth? Which Nation? The Serbian Kosovo Myth Revisited". In Bak, Janos; Jarnut, Jörg; Monnet, Pierre; Schneidmueller, Bernd (eds.). Uses and Abuses of the Middle Ages: 19th–21st Century (PDF). Wilhelm Fink. ISBN 978-3-7705-4701-2.
- Ramet, Sabrina P. (8 December 2005). Thinking about Yugoslavia: Scholarly Debates about the Yugoslav Breakup and the Wars in Bosnia and Kosovo. Cambridge University Press. ISBN 978-0-521-61690-4.
- Ramet, Sabrina P. (2011). Civic and Uncivic Values: Serbia in the Post-Milo?evi? Era. Central European University Press.
- Schwandner-Sievers, Stephanie; Fischer, Bernd Jürgen (2002). Albanian Identities: Myth and History. Indiana University Press. ISBN 0-253-34189-2.
- Segesten, Anamaria Dutceac (2009). Myth, Identity and Conflict: A Comparative Analysis of Romanian and Serbian Textbooks. ISBN 978-1-109-19838-6.
- Stoianovich, Traian (1994). Balkan Worlds: The First and Last Europe. M.E. Sharpe. ISBN 978-0-7656-3851-9.
- Trgovčević, Ljubinka (1996), "The Kosovo Myth in the First World War", in Konev, Ilija (ed.), Sveti mesta na Balkanite, Blagoevgrad: UNESCO, pp. 331–338, ISBN 9789548317429, OCLC 52405733
- Turton, David; Gonzalez, Julia (1999). Cultural Identities and Ethnic Minorities in Europe. University of Deusto. ISBN 9788474856309.
- Macdonald, David Bruce (2002). Balkan Holocausts?: Serbian and Croatian Victim Centered Propaganda and the War in Yugoslavia. Manchester University Press. pp. 75, 76, 78. ISBN 978-0-7190-6467-8.
- Judah, Tim (2002). Kosovo: War and Revenge. Yale University Press. ISBN 978-0-300-09725-2.
- Cohen, Paul (2014). History and Popular Memory: The Power of Story in Moments of Crisis. Columbia University Press. ISBN 9780231537292.
- Emmert, Thomas Allan (1991). "The Battle of Kosovo: Early Reports of Victory and Defeat". In Vucinich, Wayne S.; Emmert, Thomas Allan (eds.). Kosovo: Legacy of a Medieval Battle (PDF). University of Minnesota. ISBN 9789992287552. Archived from the original (PDF) on 25 September 2020.
- Popovich, Ljubica (1991). "The Battle of Kosovo and Battle Themes in Serbian Art". In Vucinich, Wayne S.; Emmert, Thomas Allan (eds.). Kosovo: Legacy of a Medieval Battle. University of Minnesota. ISBN 9789992287552.
- Radovic, Milja (2014). Transnational Cinema and Ideology: Representing Religion, Identity and Cultural Myths. Routledge.
- Mihaljčić, Rade (1989). The Battle of Kosovo in History and in Popular Tradition. Beogradski izdavačko-grafički zavod.
- Matthias, John; Vuckovic, Vladeta (1987). The Battle of Kosovo. Swallow Press. ISBN 9780804008976.
- Kaser, Karl; Katschnig-Fasch, Elisabeth (2005). Gender and Nation in South Eastern Europe. LIT Verlag Münster. ISBN 978-3-8258-8802-2.
- Roudometof, Victor (2001). Nationalism, Globalization, and Orthodoxy: The Social Origins of Ethnic Conflict in the Balkans. Greenwood Publishing Group. ISBN 9780313319495.
- Petrovic, Sonja (2014). "Serbian folk legends and traditions of the Battle of Kosovo". In Polymerou-Kamēlakē, Aikaterinē (ed.). Narratives Across Space and Time: Transmissions and Adaptations : Proceedings of the 15th Congress of the International Society for Folk Narrative Research (June 21–27, 2009, Athens). Academy of Athens. ISBN 9789604042869.
- Malcolm, Noel (1998). Kosovo: A Short History. Macmillan. ISBN 9780333666128.
- Ređep, Jelka (1991). "The Legend of Kosovo" (PDF). Oral Tradition. 6/2: 253–265.
- Emmert, Thomas A. (1996). "Milos Obilic and the Hero Myth" (PDF). Journal of the North American Society for Serbian Studies. 10. Archived from the original (PDF) on 10 August 2017.
- Dayantis, Jean (2004). Doukas, histoire turco-byzantine : introduction, traduction et commentaire (PhD) (in French). Paul Valéry University, Montpellier III.
- Pavlović, Aleksandar; Atanasovski, Srđan (2016). "From Myth to Territory: Vuk Karadžić, Kosovo Epics and the Role of Nineteenth-Century Intellectuals in Establishing National Narratives". Hungarian Historical Review. 2: 357–376. S2CID 209475358.
- Miles Foley, John; Chao, Gejin (2012). "Challenges in Comparative Oral Epic" (PDF). Oral Tradition. 27/2: 381–418. Archived from the original (PDF) on 22 September 2021.
- Pitulić, Valentina (2012). "Kosovska bitka između istorijskih izvora i epske legende". Zbornik radova Filozofskog fakulteta u Prištini. 42 (2): 481–491.
- Uğurlu, Mesut (2011). "Kosova Efsanesi". Hacettepe Üniversitesi Türkiyat Araştırmaları. 14 (14): 241–252.
- Humphreys, Brendan (2013). The Battle Backwards A Comparative Study of the Battle of Kosovo Polje (1389) and the Munich Agreement (1938) as Political Myths (PhD). University of Helsinki. ISBN 978-952-10-9085-1.
- Mijuk, Goran (2002). Orphan of Silence: The Poetry of Charles Simic (PhD). University of Fribourg.
