= Origin myth =

Type of myth

An origin myth is a type of myth that explains the beginnings of a natural or social aspect of the world. Creation myths are a type of origin myth narrating the formation of the universe. However, numerous cultures have stories that take place after the initial origin. These stories aim to explain the origins of natural phenomena or human institutions within an already existing world. In Greco-Roman scholarship, the terms founding myth or etiological myth (from Ancient Greek: αἴτιον aition 'cause') are occasionally used to describe a myth that clarifies an origin, particularly how an object or custom came into existence.

In modern political discourse the terms "founding myth", "foundational myth", etc. are often used as critical references to official or widely accepted narratives about the origins (or early history) of a nation, a society, or a culture.

== Nature of origin myths ==
Origin myths are narratives that explain how a particular reality came into existence. They often serve to justify the established order by attributing its establishment to sacred forces (see § Social function). The line between cosmogonic myths which describe the origin of the world and origin myths is not always clear. A myth about the origin of a specific part of the world assumes the existence of the world itself, which often relies on a cosmogonic myth. Therefore, origin myths can be seen as expanding upon and building upon their cultures' cosmogonic myths. In traditional cultures, it is common for the recitation of an origin myth to be preceded by the recitation of a cosmogonic myth.

Within academic circles, the term myth is often used specifically to refer to origin and cosmogonic myths. Folklorists, for example, reserve the term myth for stories that describe creation. Stories that do not primarily focus on origins are categorized as legend or folk tale, which are distinct from myths according to folklorists. Mircea Eliade, a historian, argues that in many traditional cultures, almost every sacred story can be considered an origin myth. Traditional societies often pattern their behavior after sacred events and view their lives as a cyclical return to a mythical age. As a result, nearly every sacred story portrays events that establish a new framework for human behavior, making them essentially stories of creation.

== Social function ==
The paradigm found in origin myths, where a first being appears and produces offspring, allows for the expression of relations between peoples, and the relations between humans and animals, plants, and spirits. Origin myths can be dynamic, and often function to justify the current state of affairs. In traditional cultures, the entities and forces described in origin myths are often considered sacred. Thus, by attributing the state of the universe to the actions of these entities and forces, origin myths give the current order an aura of sacredness: "[M]yths reveal that the World, man, and life have a supernatural origin and history, and that this history is significant, precious, and exemplary".

Founding myths unite people and tend to include mystical events along the way to make "founders" seem more desirable and heroic. Ruling monarchs or aristocracies may allege descent from mythical founders, gods or heroes in order to legitimize their control. For example, Julius Caesar and his relatives claimed Aeneas (and through Aeneas, the goddess Venus) as an ancestor.

== Founding myth ==
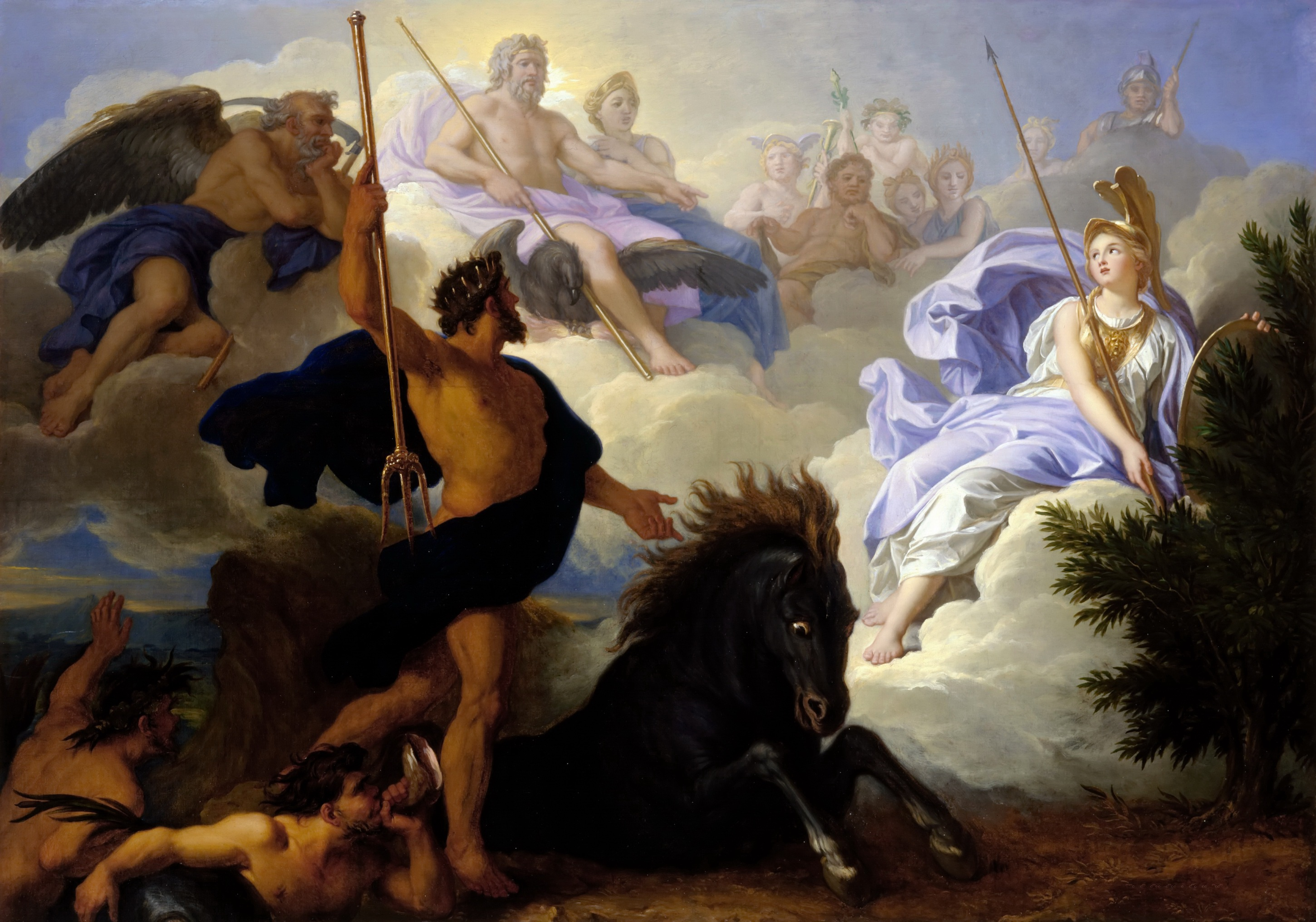
The Dispute of Minerva and Neptune (c. 1689 or 1706) by René-Antoine Houasse, depicting the founding myth of Athens

A founding myth or etiological myth (Greek aition) explains either:

- the origins of a ritual or the founding of a city
- the ethnogenesis of a group presented as a genealogy with a founding father, and thus the origin of a nation (natio 'birth')
- the spiritual origins of a belief, philosophy, discipline, or idea – presented as a narrative

Beginning in prehistorical times, many civilizations and kingdoms adopted some version of a heroic model national origin myth, including the Hittites and Zhou dynasty in the Bronze Age; the Scythians, Wusun, Romans and Goguryeo in antiquity; Turks and Mongols during the Middle Ages; and the Dzungar Khanate in the early modern period.

In the founding myth of the Zhou dynasty in China, Lady Yuan makes a ritual sacrifice to conceive, then becomes pregnant after stepping into the footprint of the King of Heaven. She gives birth to a son, Hou Ji, whom she leaves alone in dangerous places where he is protected by sheep, cattle, birds, and woodcutters. Convinced that he is a supernatural being, she takes him back and raises him. When he grows to adulthood, he takes the position of Master of Horses in the court of Emperor Yao, and becomes successful at growing grains, gourds and beans. According to the legend, he becomes founder of the Zhou dynasty after overthrowing the evil ruler of Shang.

Like other civilizations, the Scythians also claimed descent from the son of the god of heaven. One day, the daughter of the god of the Dnieper River stole a young man's horses while he was herding his cattle, and forced him to lie with her before returning them. From this union, she conceived three sons, giving them their father's greatbow when they came of age. The son who could draw the bow would become king. All tried, but only the youngest was successful. On his attempt, three golden objects fell from the sky: a plow and yoke, a sword, and a cup. When the eldest two tried to pick them up, fire prevented them. After this, it was decided the youngest son, Scythes, would become king, and his people would be known as Scythians.

The Torah (or Pentateuch, as biblical scholars sometimes call it) is the collective name for the first five books of the Bible: Genesis, Exodus, Leviticus, Numbers, and Deuteronomy. It forms the charter myth of Israel, the story of the people's origins and the foundations of their culture and institutions, and it is a fundamental principle of Judaism that the relationship between God and his chosen people was set out on Mount Sinai through the Torah.

A founding myth may serve as the primary exemplum, as the myth of Ixion was the original Greek example of a murderer rendered unclean by his crime, who needed cleansing (catharsis) of his impurity.

Founding myths feature prominently in Greek mythology. "Ancient Greek rituals were bound to prominent local groups and hence to specific localities", Walter Burkert has observed, "i.e., the sanctuaries and altars that had been set up for all time". Thus Greek and Hebrew founding myths established the special relationship between a deity and local people, who traced their origins from a hero and authenticated their ancestral rights through the founding myth. Greek founding myths often embody a justification for the ancient overturning of an older, archaic order, reformulating a historical event anchored in the social and natural world to valorize current community practices, creating symbolic narratives of "collective importance" enriched with metaphor to account for traditional chronologies, and constructing an etiology considered to be plausible among those with a cultural investment.

In the Greek view, the mythic past had deep roots in historic time, its legends treated as facts, as Carlo Brillante has noted, its heroic protagonists seen as links between the "age of origins" and the mortal, everyday world that succeeded it. A modern translator of Apollonius of Rhodes' Argonautica has noted, of the many aitia embedded as digressions in that Hellenistic epic, that "crucial to social stability had to be the function of myths in providing explanations, authorization or empowerment for the present in terms of origins: this could apply, not only to foundations or charter myths and genealogical trees (thus supporting family or territorial claims) but also to personal moral choices." In the period after Alexander the Great expanded the Hellenistic world, Greek poetry—Callimachus wrote a whole work simply titled Aitia—is replete with founding myths. Simon Goldhill employs the metaphor of sedimentation in describing Apollonius' laying down of layers "where each object, cult, ritual, name, may be opened... into a narrative of origination, and where each narrative, each event, may lead to a cult, ritual, name, monument."

A notable example is the myth of the foundation of Rome—the tale of Romulus and Remus, which Virgil in turn broadens in his Aeneid with the odyssey of Aeneas and his razing of Lavinium, and his son Iulus's later relocation and rule of the famous twins' birthplace Alba Longa, and their descent from his royal line, thus fitting perfectly into the already established canon of events. Similarly, the Old Testament's story of the Exodus serves as the founding myth for the community of Israel, telling how God delivered the Israelites from slavery and how they therefore belonged to him through the Covenant of Mount Sinai.

During the Middle Ages, founding myths of the medieval communes of northern Italy manifested the increasing self-confidence of the urban population and the will to find a Roman origin, however tenuous and legendary. In 13th-century Padua, when each commune looked for a Roman founder – and if one was not available, invented one—a legend had been current in the city, attributing its foundation to the Trojan Antenor.

== See also ==
- Creation myth – Symbolic narrative of how the world began
- Dindsenchas – Class of onomastic text in early Irish literature
- Etiology – Study of causation, or origination
- Just-so story – Unverifiable narrative explanation
- List of national founders – List of people credited with creating the state
- Mythomoteur – Constitutive myth of an ethnic group
- National myth – Inspiring narrative about a nation's past
- Origin story – Plot device
- Pourquoi story – Narrative that explains why something is the way it is, generally fabulous or mythical
