= Serbian national identity =

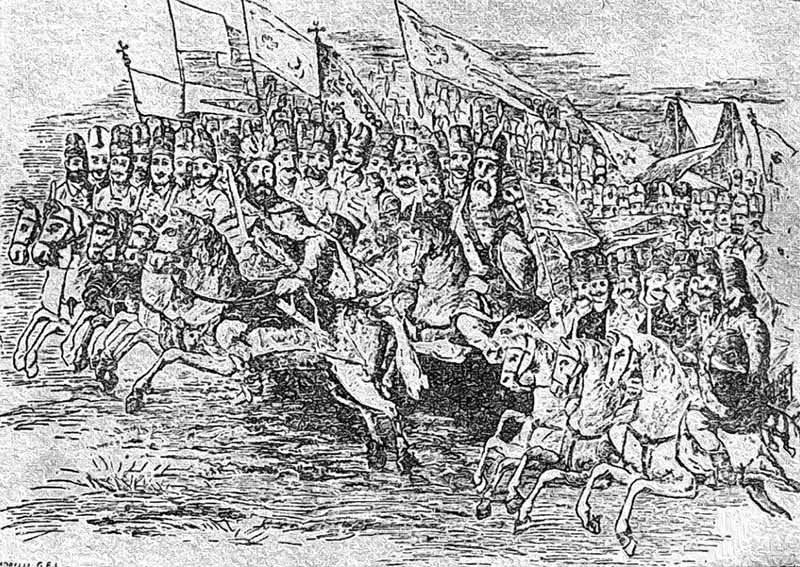
Serbian warriors on the Kosovo field The Kosovo Myth views the Serbs as martyrs and defenders of honour and Christianity.

Serbia is the nation state of the Serbs, who are Serbia's dominant ethnic group. Serbs are also majority in Republika Srpska, an entity of Bosnia and Herzegovina. In the 19th century, the Serbian national identity was manifested, with awareness of history and tradition, medieval heritage, cultural unity, despite Serbs living under different empires. Three elements, together with the legacy of the Nemanjić dynasty, were crucial in forging identity and preservation during foreign domination: the Serbian Orthodox Church, Kosovo Myth, and the Serbian language. The identification with medieval heritage through venerating Serbian saints, together with Serbian epic poetry, had helped develop a national consciousness separate from other Orthodox Christian peoples in the Balkans. The heroic epic poetry cycles inspired the Serbs to revive their heroic past and freedom. In the stories, the hajduks were heroes: they had played the role of the Serbian elite during Ottoman rule, they had defended the Serbs against Ottoman oppression, and prepared for the national liberation and contributed to it in the Serbian Revolution. The symbolical Kosovo Myth became the mythomoteur, signifying martyrdom and defence of Serb honour and Christendom against Turks (Muslims). When the Principality of Serbia gained independence from the Ottoman Empire, Orthodoxy became crucial in defining the national identity, instead of language which was shared by other South Slavs (Croats and Muslims).

The Cyrillic script is an important symbol of Serbian identity. Under the Constitution of Serbia, Serbian Cyrillic is the only script in official use; it is also co-official in Montenegro and Bosnia and Herzegovina. The double-headed eagle and the shield with fire steels are the main heraldic symbols which have represented the national identity of the Serbian people across the centuries.

An international self-esteem survey conducted on 16,998 people from 53 nations was published by the American Psychological Association in 2005; the questionnaire included views of one's individual personality, that of one's own nation and that of other nations. The research found that Serbia was placed first of the most self-esteemed nation, ahead of the United States (6th), and Japan (last place), and the majority of nations, as well as Serbs themselves, agreed on this. The research also noted that Serbia was among the 10 most collectivist nations.

== See also ==
- National symbols of Serbia
- Serbian nationalism
- Serbian Revival
- Serbian Question
