= Serbian Revival =

Period in Serbian history

The Serbian Revival (Serbian: Српски препород, Srpski preporod) or Serbian national awakening refers to a period in the history of the Serbs between the 18th century and the de jure establishment of the Principality of Serbia (1878). It began in Habsburg territory, in Sremski Karlovci. The Serbian renaissance (Српска ренесанса, Srpska renesansa) is said to have begun in 17th-century Banat. The Serbian Revival began earlier than the Bulgarian National Revival. The first revolt in the Ottoman Empire to acquire a national character was the Serbian Revolution (1804–1817), which was the culmination of the Serbian renaissance. According to Jelena Milojković-Djurić: "The first literary and learned society among the Slavs was Matica srpska, founded by the leaders of Serbian revival in Pest in 1826." Vojvodina became the cradle of the Serbian renaissance during the 19th century. Philologist and language reformer Vuk Stefanović Karadžić and cultural benefactor Sava Tekelija were two of the most instrumental figures in this period.

The Serbian Revival threatened to jeopardize Austria, to question its strategic interests. The Serbs had established the short-lived Serbian Vojvodina during the 1848 Revolutions through armed conflict with the Hungarians, as part of the Revival.

Although the Serbian Revival adopted the idea of cooperation between the Yugoslav peoples, and was influenced by its national policy basis and possibility of establishment of a Yugoslav state, it still, in a cultural and national-political view, stayed Pan-Serb.

Second Serbian Uprising (1815–17)

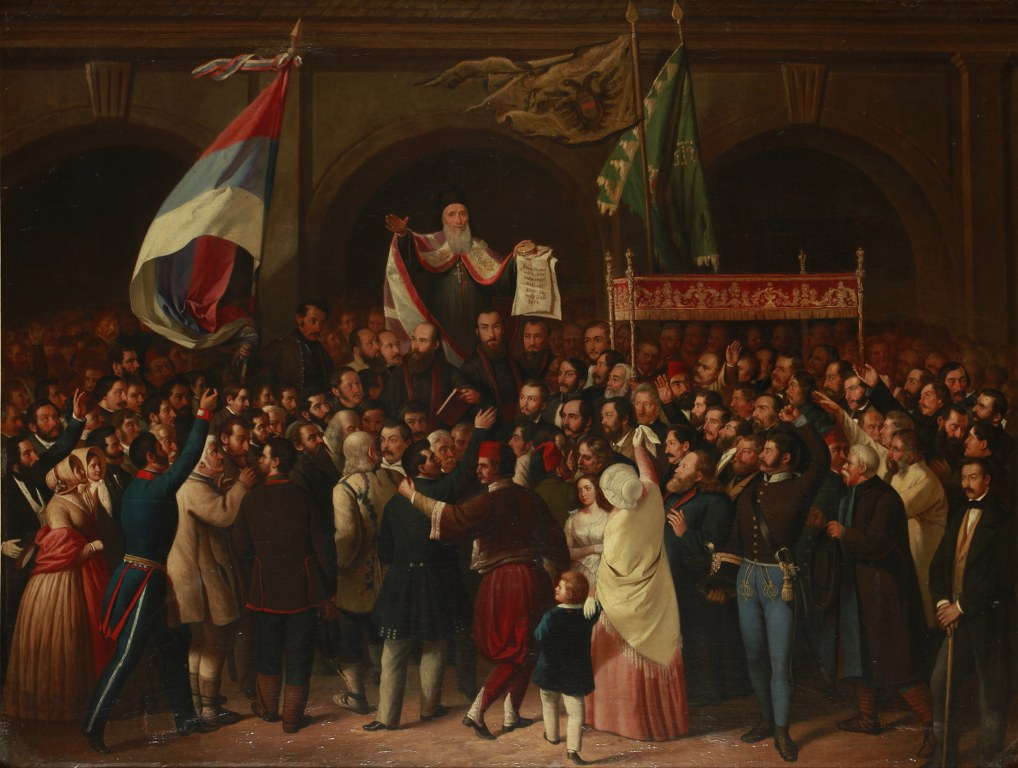
Proclamation of Serbian Vojvodina (1848)

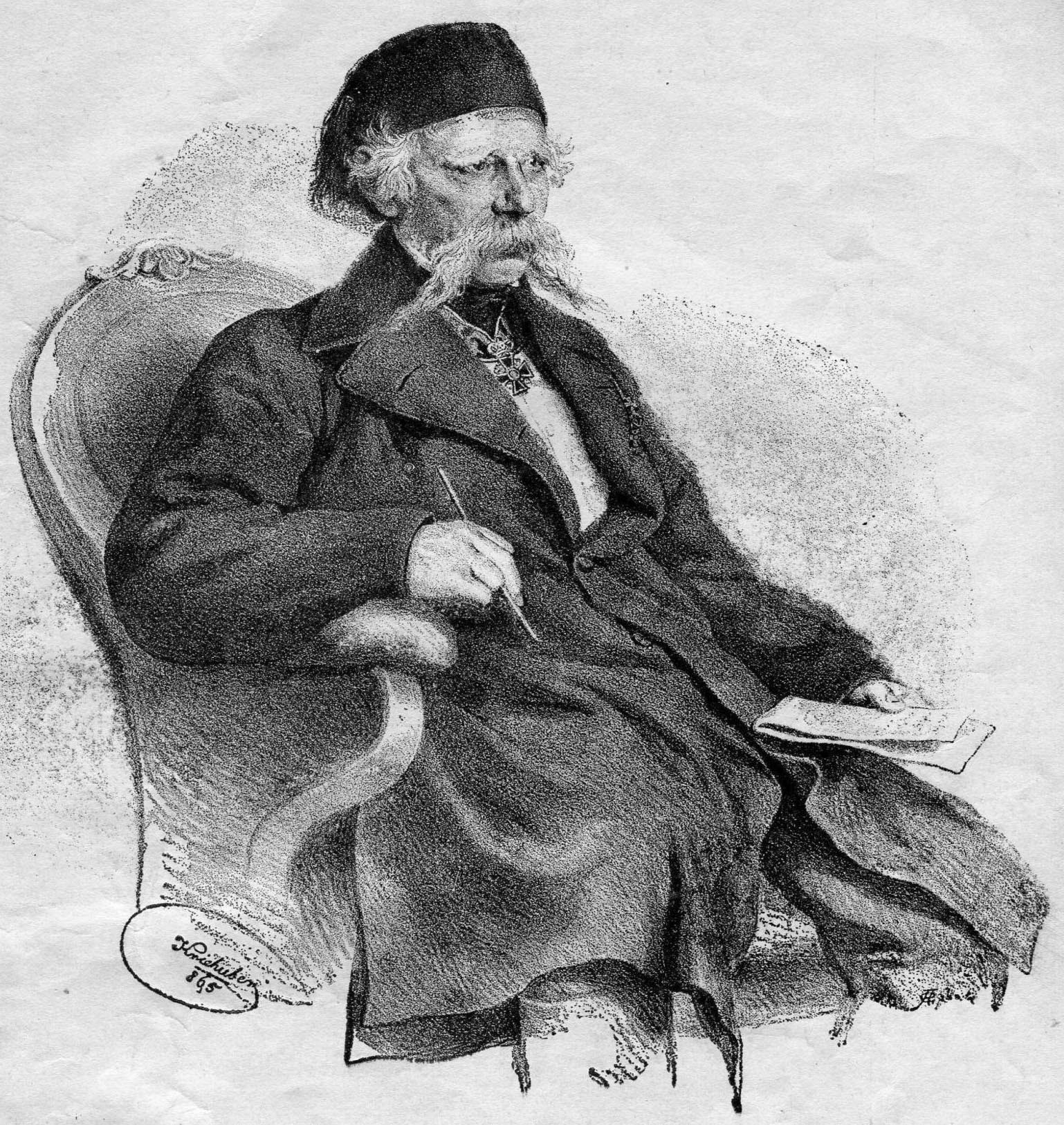
Vuk Stefanović Karadžić

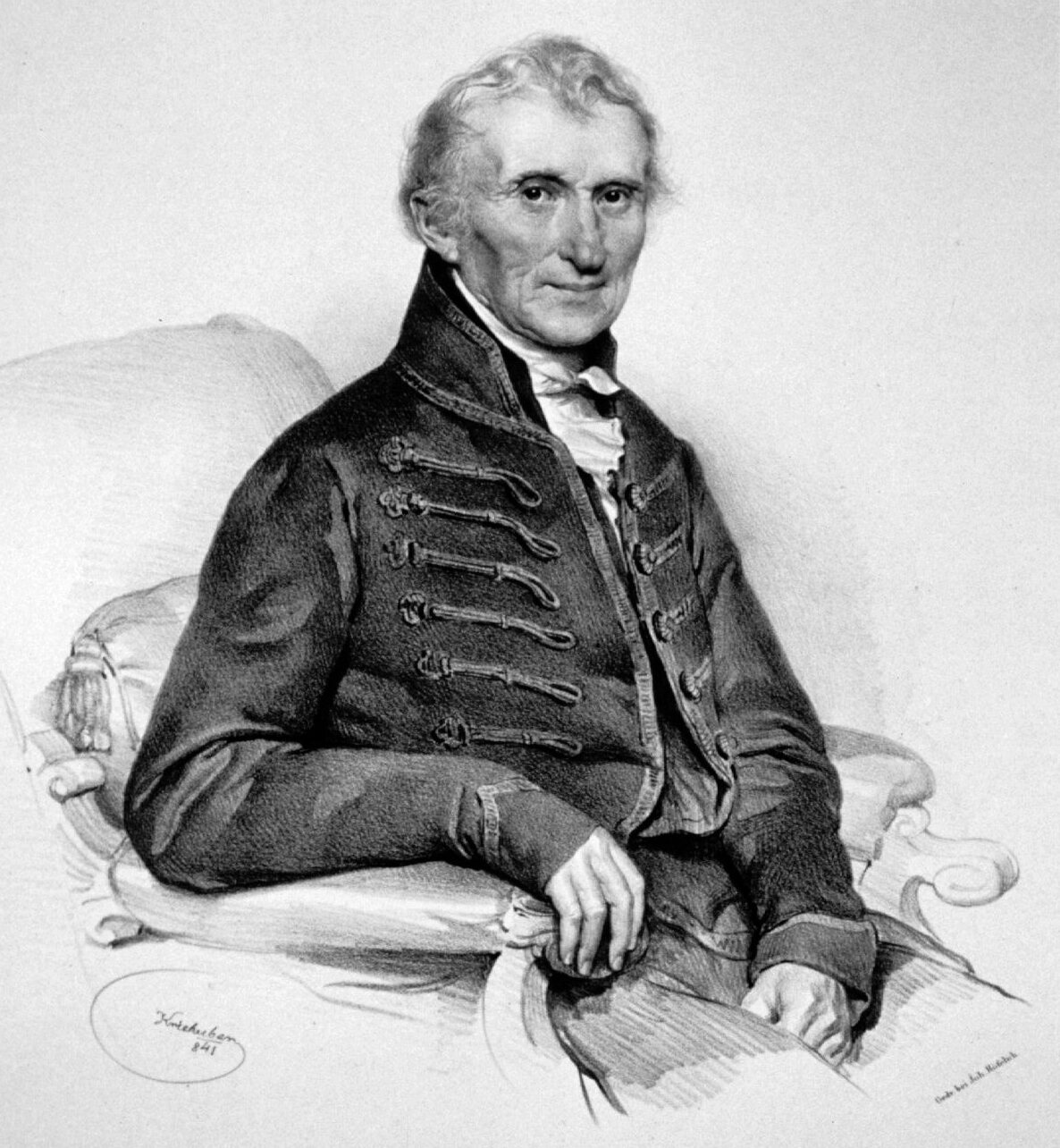
Sava Tekelija

== See also ==
- Serbian national identity
- Pan-Slavism
- Yugoslavism
