= Serbian folklore =

Folk culture of Serbs

Serbian folklore is the folk traditions among ethnic Serbs. The earliest examples of Serbian folklore are seen in the pre-Christian Slavic customs transformed into Christianity.

== Folklore ==
The Apostles of the Slavs, Cyril and Methodius, have been venerated by Serbian Orthodox Christians since their Christianization in 867.

In Krajište and Vlasina there are epic stories of the extermination of Romans in a battle, and of the settling of Serbs (Antes)

Unlike East Slavic mythology, south slavic mythology distinguishes between two different kinds of dragons: the benevolent zmej and the malevolent ala.

=== Serbian Epic poetry ===
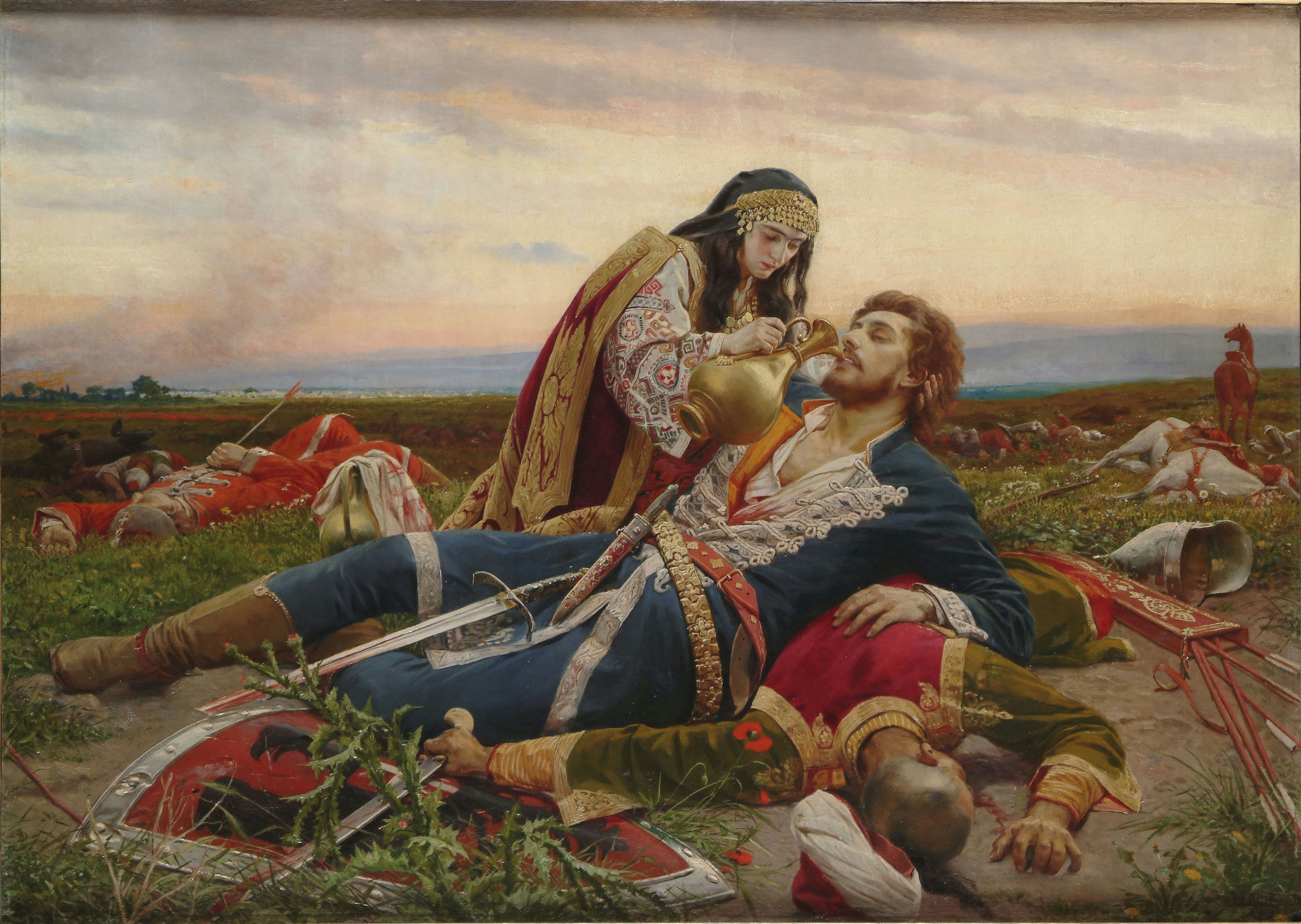
Kosovo Maiden by Uroš Predić Dying Pavle Orlović is given water by a maiden who seeks her fiancée at the battlefields of Kosovo Polje (Gazimestan), he tells her that her love, Milan, and his two blood-brothers Miloš and Ivan were killed during the Battle of Kosovo by the Ottoman Turks. -taklolen from the Serb Epic poem

Serbian epic poetry is a form of epic poetry written by Serbs originating in today's Serbia, Bosnia and Herzegovina and Montenegro. The main cycles were composed by unknown Serb authors between the 14th and 19th centuries. They are largely concerned with historical events and personages.

The corpus of Serbian epic poetry is divided into cycles:

- Non-historic cycle
- Pre-Kosovo cycle - poems about events that predate the Battle of Kosovo - songs about royal family-Nemanjići and folk songs
- Cycle of Kraljević Marko
- Kosovo cycle - poems about events that happened just before and after the Battle of Kosovo (no poem covers the battle itself)
- Post-Kosovo cycle - poems about post-Battle events
- Poems about the liberation of Serbia
- Poems about the liberation of Montenegro

== See also ==
- Serbian folk music
- Serbian dances
- Serbian culture
