= Mythomoteur =

Constitutive myth of an ethnic group

A mythomoteur (compound of the French words for myth and engine) is the constitutive myth that gives an ethnic group its sense of purpose. The term was first used in this context by Ramon d’Abadal i de Vinyals, and was later taken up by John Armstrong in his book Nations before Nationalism. It has subsequently become a common theme in Anthony D. Smith's work on ethnicity and nationalism, particularly his book The Ethnic Origins of Nations. Three types of mythomoteur have been identified, the communal-political, the communal-religious, and the dynastic.

== Examples ==
- Serbs: Kosovo Myth
- Romanians: Protochronism
- Gikûyû: Ngai Mwenenyaga

== See also ==
- National myth – Inspiring narrative about a nation's past
- National epic – Literary work that is central to a nation's identity

== Bibliography ==
- Mottram, Stewart James; Prescott, Sarah (1 November 2012). Writing Wales, from the Renaissance to Romanticism. Ashgate Publishing, Ltd. ISBN 978-1-4094-7107-3.
