= Vidovdan =

Serbian national and religious holiday on 28 June

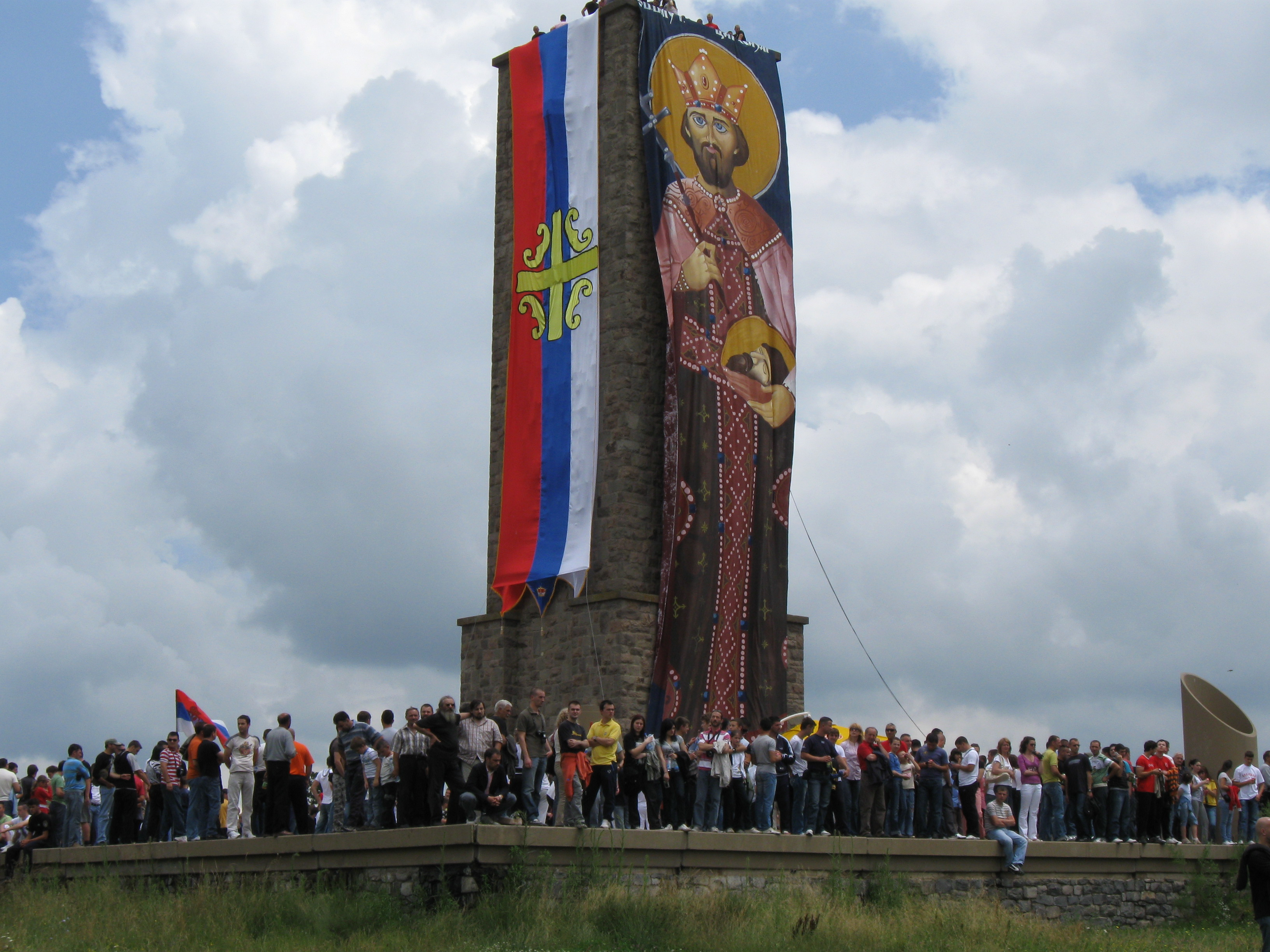
- 2009 Vidovdan celebration at Gazimestan monument
- Observed by: Serbs (Serbian Orthodox)
- Observances: Feast day
- Date: 28 June (Gregorian calendar); 15 June (Julian calendar)
- Frequency: Annual
- Related to: Slava

Vidovdan (Serbian: Видовдан, lit. 'Saint Vitus Day') is a Serbian national and religious holiday, a slava (feast day) celebrated on 28 June (Gregorian calendar), or 15 June according to the Julian calendar. The Serbian Orthodox Church designates it as the memorial day to Saint Prince Lazar and the Serbian holy martyrs who fell during the Battle of Kosovo against the Ottoman Empire on 15 June 1389 (according to the Julian calendar). It is an important part of Serb ethnic and Serbian national identity.

== History ==
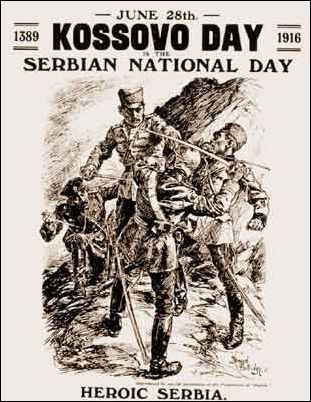
British wartime poster promoting solidarity and friendship with the Serbian allies during the Serbian Campaign of World War I

The day became highly regarded by Serbs after the fourteenth century when the Battle of Kosovo took place on Saint Vitus Day in 1389. A Serb-led Christian coalition by Prince Lazar fought the Ottoman army on the Kosovo field. Although the battle itself was inconclusive, and both Sultan Murad and Prince Lazar were slain, it led to the Ottoman conquest of Serbian principalities. After the Great Migrations of the Serbs in 1690, Vidovdan became a day to honor those who fought in the battle and fell "for their faith and homeland". The holiday was institutionalized by the church in 1849 and politically and publicly first celebrated in 1851 as a representation of the struggle for Serbian freedom from Ottoman subjection. It slowly achieved popularity with the growth of national identities in Europe in the nineteenth century and came to be known as a day of remembrance. After 1918, the Yugoslav government designated Vidovdan as a day of remembrance to honor all those who died in war, particularly those of the Balkan Wars and World War I.

There are significant events which coincidentally or intentionally occurred on Vidovdan:

- Serbian declaration of war against the Ottoman Empire in 1876 (from 1800 to 1899, Vidovdan was celebrated on 15 June Julian = 27 June Gregorian)
- Signing of the Austro–Serbian Alliance of 1881 (on 16 June Julian = 28 June Gregorian, the day after Vidovdan)
- Assassination of the Austro-Hungarian crown prince, Franz Ferdinand by Gavrilo Princip in 1914 which triggered World War I (Vidovdan is celebrated on 15 June Julian = 28 June Gregorian)
- King Alexander I's proclamation of the new 1921 Constitution of the Kingdom of Serbs, Croats and Slovenes, known thereafter as the Vidovdan Constitution (Vidovdanski ustav).
- On the 600th anniversary of the battle of Kosovo (1989), Serbian leader Slobodan Milošević delivered the Gazimestan speech on the site of the battle. This was the first public celebration of Vidovdan since the Yugoslav communist era.

Beginning in the late 19th century, Serbian publications began to appear in Serbian literature promoting the idea that the holiday originated from the Slavic god Svetovit. The first to put forth such a view was Natko Nodilo, who attributed the cult of Svetovit to all Slavs, whose worship in Serbia was later deliberately replaced by that of a saint with a similar name. This view was supported by some later researchers. However, it is generally believed that the cult of Svetovit existed only among the Polabian Slavs and that Vidovdan has nothing to do with this god, and that linking the deity to the holiday is a creation of romanticism.
