= Battle of Kosovo =

1389 battle between Serbian-led forces and the Ottoman Empire

- Part of the Ottoman wars in Europe and Serbian–Ottoman wars
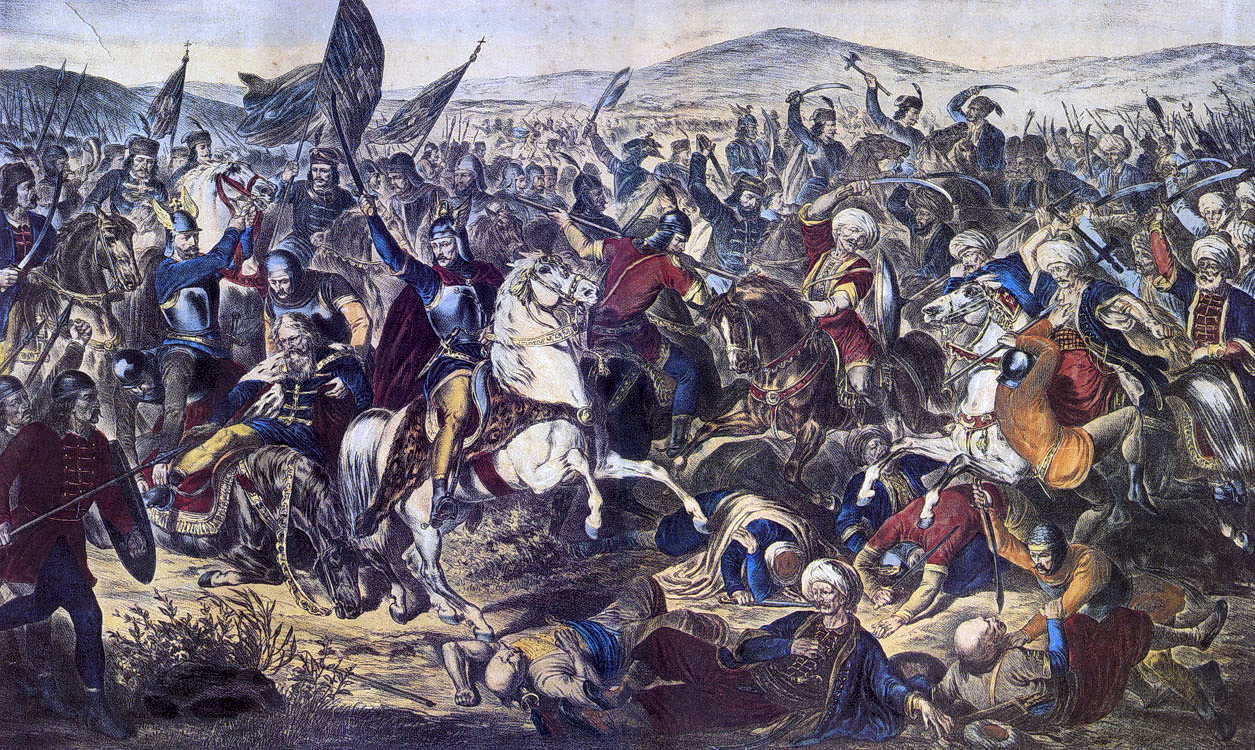
- 1870 painting of the battle
Date	15 June 1389
Location	Kosovo field, District of Branković 42°43′03″N 21°05′06″E
Result	Inconclusive

Belligerents
Ottoman Empire; Beylik of Isfendiyar	Moravian Serbia; District of Branković; Kingdom of Bosnia; Principality of Muzaka; Jonima Family

Commanders and leaders
Murad I †; Şehzade Bayezid; Yakub Çelebi (executed)	Prince Lazar †; Vuk Branković; Vlatko Vuković

Strength
27,000–30,000; higher estimates up to 40,000	12,000–20,000; higher estimates up to 25,000

Casualties and losses
- Very heavy
- Location within Kosovo Battle of Kosovo (Serbia) Battle of Kosovo (Balkans)

The Battle of Kosovo took place on 15 June 1389 between an army led by the Serbian Prince Lazar Hrebeljanović and an invading army of the Ottoman Empire under the command of Sultan Murad I. It was one of the largest battles of the Late Middle Ages.

The battle was fought on the Kosovo field in the territory ruled by Serbian nobleman Vuk Branković, in what is today Kosovo, about 5 kilometers (3.1 mi) northwest of the modern city of Pristina. The army under Prince Lazar consisted mostly of his own troops, a contingent led by Branković, and a contingent sent from Bosnia by King Tvrtko I, commanded by Vlatko Vuković. Additionally, Lazar was also supported by a Christian coalition from various European ethnic groups. Prince Lazar was the ruler of Moravian Serbia and the most powerful among the Serbian regional lords of the time, while Branković ruled the District of Branković and other areas, recognizing Lazar as his overlord.

Reliable historical accounts of the battle are scarce. The bulk of both armies were wiped out, and Lazar and Murad were killed. Murad's assassination is attributed to a Serbian knight named Miloš Obilić. The battle marked the only time in history when an Ottoman Sultan was killed in battle. Serbian manpower was depleted and had no capacity to field large armies against future Ottoman campaigns, which relied on new reserve forces from Anatolia. The Serbian principalities that were not already Ottoman vassals, became so in the following years.

The mythologization of the battle and writings began shortly after the event, though the legend was not fully formed immediately after the battle but evolved from different originators into various versions. In Serbian folklore, the Kosovo Myth acquired new meanings and importance during the rise of Serbian nationalism in the 19th century as the Serbian state sought to expand, especially towards Kosovo which was still part of the Ottoman Empire. In modern discourse, the battle would come to be seen as integral to Serbian history, tradition and national identity. Vidovdan is celebrated on June 28 and is an important Serbian national and religious holiday as a memorial day for the Battle of Kosovo.

== Background ==
Emperor Stefan Uroš IV Dušan "the Mighty" (r. 1331–55) was succeeded by his son Stefan Uroš V "the Weak" (r. 1355–71), whose reign was characterized by the decline of central power and the rise of numerous virtually independent principalities; this period is known as the fall of the Serbian Empire. Uroš V was neither able to sustain the great empire created by his father nor repulse foreign threats and limit the independence of the nobility; he died childless in December 1371, after much of the Serbian nobility had been destroyed by the Ottomans in the Battle of Maritsa earlier that year. Prince Lazar, ruler of the northern part of the former empire (of Moravian Serbia), was aware of the Ottoman threat and began diplomatic and military preparations for a campaign against them.

After the defeat of the Ottomans at Pločnik (1386) and Bileća (1388), Murad I, the reigning Ottoman sultan, moved his troops from Philippoupolis to Ihtiman (modern Bulgaria) in the spring of 1388. From there they traveled across Velbužd and Kratovo (modern North Macedonia). Though longer than the alternative route through Sofia and the Nišava Valley, this led the Ottoman forces to Kosovo, one of the most important crossroads in the Balkans. From Kosovo, they could attack the lands of either Prince Lazar or Vuk Branković. Having stayed in Kratovo for a time, Murad and his troops marched through Kumanovo, Preševo, and Gjilan to Pristina, where he arrived on 14 June.

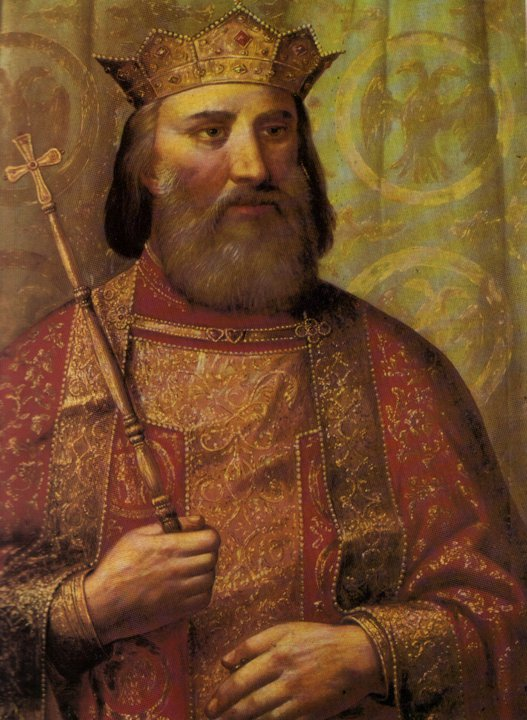
Prince Lazar Hrebeljanović

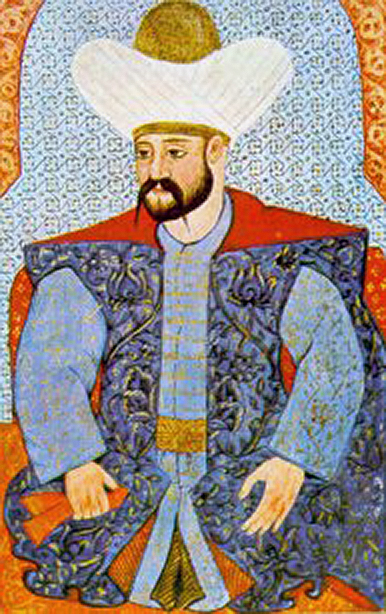
Sultan Murad Hüdavendigâr

While there is less information about Lazar's preparations, he gathered his troops near Niš, on the right bank of the South Morava. His forces likely remained there until he learned that Murad had moved to Velbužd, whereupon he moved across Prokuplje to Kosovo. This was the best place he could choose as a battlefield, as it gave him control of all the routes that Murad could take. The historiographical examination of the battle is challenging. No first-hand accounts from participants in the battle exist. Contemporary sources are written from widely diverging points of view and not much is discussed in them about battle tactics, army size and other battleground details.

== Army composition ==
=== Army size ===
Many details regarding the Battle of Kosovo are uncertain. The composition of both armies is a matter of scholarly dispute, and there exists no reliable information on the topic. Nonetheless, the battle of Kosovo was one of the largest battles of the late medieval times, regardless of the exact army size. Estimates about the sizes of both armies vary, but it is generally believed that the Ottoman army was larger. The leading estimate accepted by Western scholars is that Lazar's army contained 15,000-20,000 troops, whilst Murad's army consisted of 27,000–30,000. A higher estimate suggests a total of 40,000 troops for the Ottomans and 25,000 for Lazar's coalition.

Ottoman historian Mehmed Neşri, who authored the first detailed report in Ottoman historiography about the battle of Kosovo in 1521, placed the size of the Christian coalition at around 500,000, claiming that it was double the size of the Ottoman army. Neşri was presenting an Ottoman imperial narrative, and considering the fact that an Ottoman Sultan died during the battle, Ottoman sources typically exaggerate the size of the Christian army. According to historian Noel Malcolm, Ottoman writers were most likely eager to build up the size and significance of Lazar's army, which they described as vastly outnumbering Murat's, in order to add to the glory of the "Turkish victory", and it is generally agreed that the Ottoman sources contain exaggerations in favour of the Ottomans. The first known European and Ottoman accounts on the battle in general are strongly influenced by the long-term political consequences of increasing Ottoman conquest, and none of these narratives form a credible basis for the reconstruction of the battle itself, regardless of the author's origins. Contemporary documents were not heavily concerned about the details surrounding the size of both armies, their tactics, their armaments, and the course of the battle, and European reports were mostly focused on the death of Murad and a supposed Christian victory. Additionally, the earliest Serbian sources for the Battle of Kosovo were more so the product of religious rhetoric than historical data, and they are not useful in providing particular details on the battle. Ultimately, every contemporary account of the battle has been composed under various influences of a religious, political, and literary nature, and scholars can only try and distinguish or trace some of the early strands of tradition which were to eventually become part of the Kosovo Myth to reach any sort of conclusion.

=== Ottoman army ===
The Ottoman army was reinforced by their Muslim vassals and allies from Anatolia, having been supported by auxiliary troops from the Anatolian Turkoman Beylik of Isfendiyar, Murad's army comprised no more than 2,000 Janissaries. Additionally, Murad's army consisted of as many as 8,500 cavalrymen, Both armies contained soldiers of various origins, and the Ottomans were reinforced by their Christian vassals. The Ottoman army likely included a substantial number of non-Turkish contingents, among whom were the forces of two regional Serbian rulers, Marko Kraljević and Konstantin Dejanović, who governed parts of Macedonia and Bulgaria as Ottoman vassals. As a condition of their vassalage, they were obliged to provide troops, and it is generally assumed that they did so and that either one or both rulers personally took part in the battle on the Ottoman side. As suggested by contemporary chronicles and events involving John VII Palaiologos, Greek and Genoese soldiers may also have taken part in the battle as part of the Ottoman army, and it is possible that some Albanians fought on the Ottoman side as well.

=== Lazar's coalition ===
The main forces of Lazar's coalition included the Serbian contingent from his own principality, troops brought by his son-in-law, Vuk Branković, and Bosnian forces under Vlatko Vuković, sent by Lazar's ally King Tvrtko of Bosnia. While the great majority of Lazar's army were Serbs, it also included a coalition of Albanians, Croatians, Hungarians, Vlachs and Bulgarians. Some contemporary Ottoman sources have also claimed that the Czechs and other western Europeans also fought on Lazar's side. Historian Dejan Djokić initially noted that Bosnians, Bulgarians, Albanians, Vlachs, and Hungarians are believed to have participated in Lazar’s army in addition to the predominantly Serbian forces. He later considered it improbable that Lazar led a broad coalition that included Albanians, Bulgarians, Czechs, Hungarians, Germans, and Vlachs, alongside the Serbian and Bosnian troops. Historian Daniel Waley has stated that next to nothing can be said with assurance about the numbers and multi-ethnic composition of both armies.

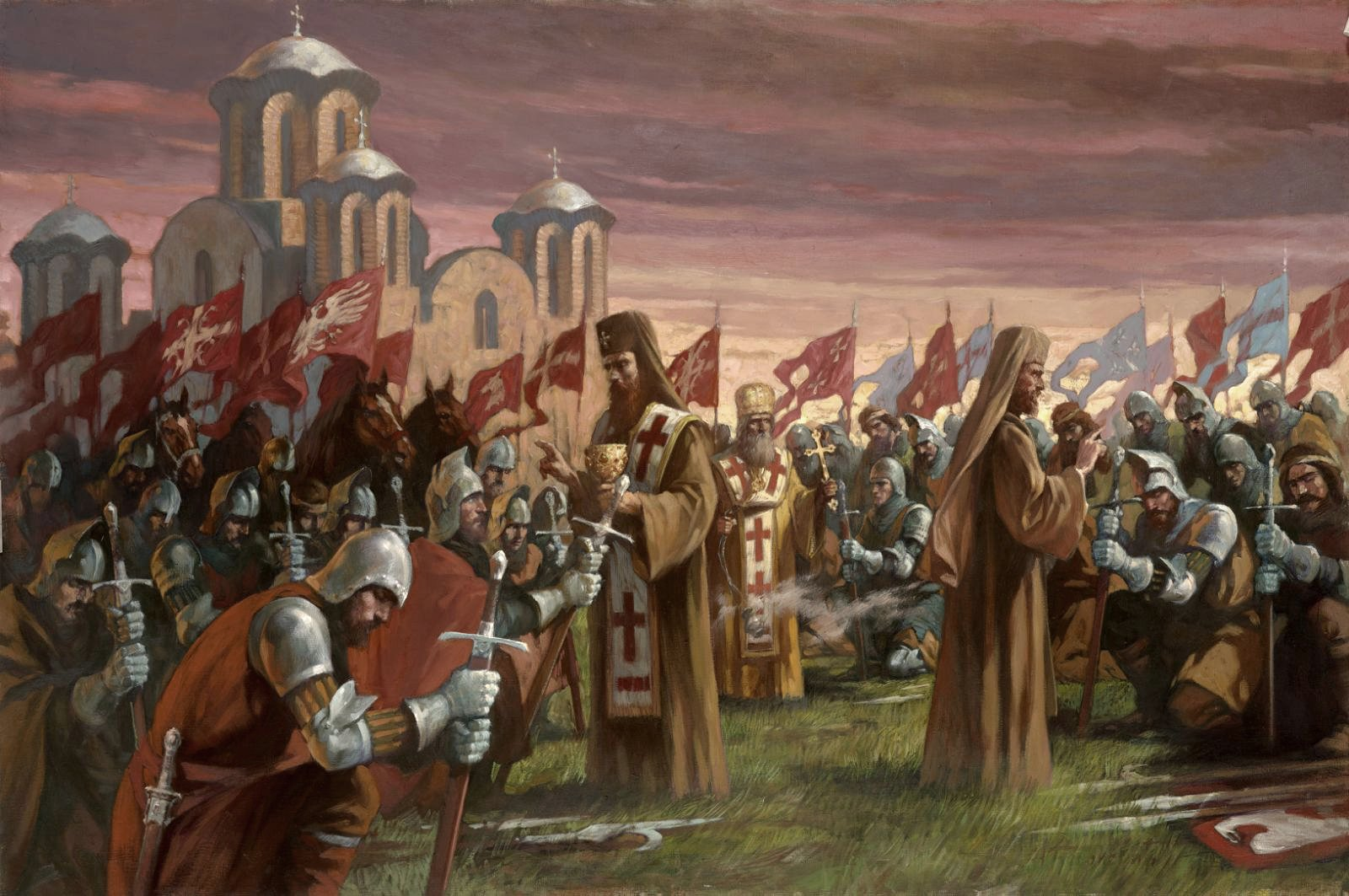
Prince Lazar's soldiers taking Eucharist before the battle.

The Hungarians have been suggested as particularly likely participants among the foreign contingents. Lazar’s son-in-law, Nicholas Garai, was one of the most powerful noblemen in Hungary, and probably sent a contingent to join Lazar's coalition. According to Malcolm, any senior knight sent by Garai would have held an honoured place. The mythological figure Miloš Obilić may have been based on a Hungarian knight who is said to have killed Murad, as suggested by some accounts, and this claim is taken seriously by modern scholars.

Several Albanian lords and aristocrats have been suggested as participants in the battle on the side of the Christian coalition, including Teodor II Muzaka, Đurađ II Balšić, and Dhimitër Jonima. Of those lords, Teodor II Muzaka verifiably fought and died during the battle, alongside a number of fellow Albanians. Albanian historiography focuses on the role of Albanians in Lazar's coalition, whilst Serbian historiography minimises it or ignores it outright. Based on their acceptance of Ottoman sources, Albanian historiography claims that the Albanians under those aforementioned leaders may have accounted for a quarter of Lazar's coalition. Contemporary Greek authors list among participants northern Albanians, those of Himarë, Epirus and the coast. Unlike Teodor II Muzaka, the lords Dhimitër Jonima and Đurađ II Balšić are only mentioned in contemporary Ottoman sources. Balšić's presence in particular has been contested and denied by multiple scholars, who assert that Balšić was actually in Ulcinj at the time of the battle as indicated by a Ragusan invitation, that he was an Ottoman vassal, and that his personal conflicts with Tvrtko I would have made his participation unlikely. Historian Luan Malltezi has argued that although the Ragusans sent an invitation to Ulcinj, Balšić did not necessarily have to be there to accept it, and that his response arrived in Ragusa only in the final days of August, two months after the battle.

A group of crusaders linked to the Knights of Rhodes, led by John of Palisna, has been suggested as participants on Lazar's side by Croatian historian Neven Budak, who quotes in the Italian Chronicles Annales Forolivienses, "Domino Johanne Banno cum Crucesignatis" (Ban John with those marked by a cross). According to Budak, "Domine Johanne Bano" probably refers to John of Palisna the Ban of Croatia, but the writer of the Chronicles could have been honouring someone who was no longer a ban, such as John Horvat. British historian and Hospitaller scholar Anthony Luttrell disputes Budak’s assumption that "crucesignati" means the Knights Hospitaller, stating, “Hospitallers wore a cross but technically were not crusaders or crucesignati, how the author of the Annales Forolivienses understood the term is uncertain.” Budak himself suggests that the term could simply designate warriors who marked a cross on their clothing, a customary practice before going to war against infidels.

Additionally, it has been suggested that Vlach contingents from Voivode Mircea were also present in Lazar's army.

=== Troop deployment ===
Troop disposition

Serbian forces assembled at Kosovo Field approximately three miles northwest of Pristina. Prince Lazar led the Serb center, Branković took command of the right, and Vuković commanded the left, which also included the foreign contingents. The formidable Serb cavalry took their place at the forefront, with lighter cavalry armed with bows positioned on the flanks.

Murad led the Ottoman center, entrusting his younger son Bayezid and his commander Evrenoz with the European troops on the right wing; Murad's other son, Yakub, led the Anatolian troops on the left. The wings were fortified with around 1,000 archers, while the Janissaries held the central position, supported by Murad and his cavalry guard standing behind them. Ottoman sources claim that Murat also placed camels in front to scare the Serbian cavalry. One of the Ottoman commanders was Pasha Yiğit Bey.

== Battle ==
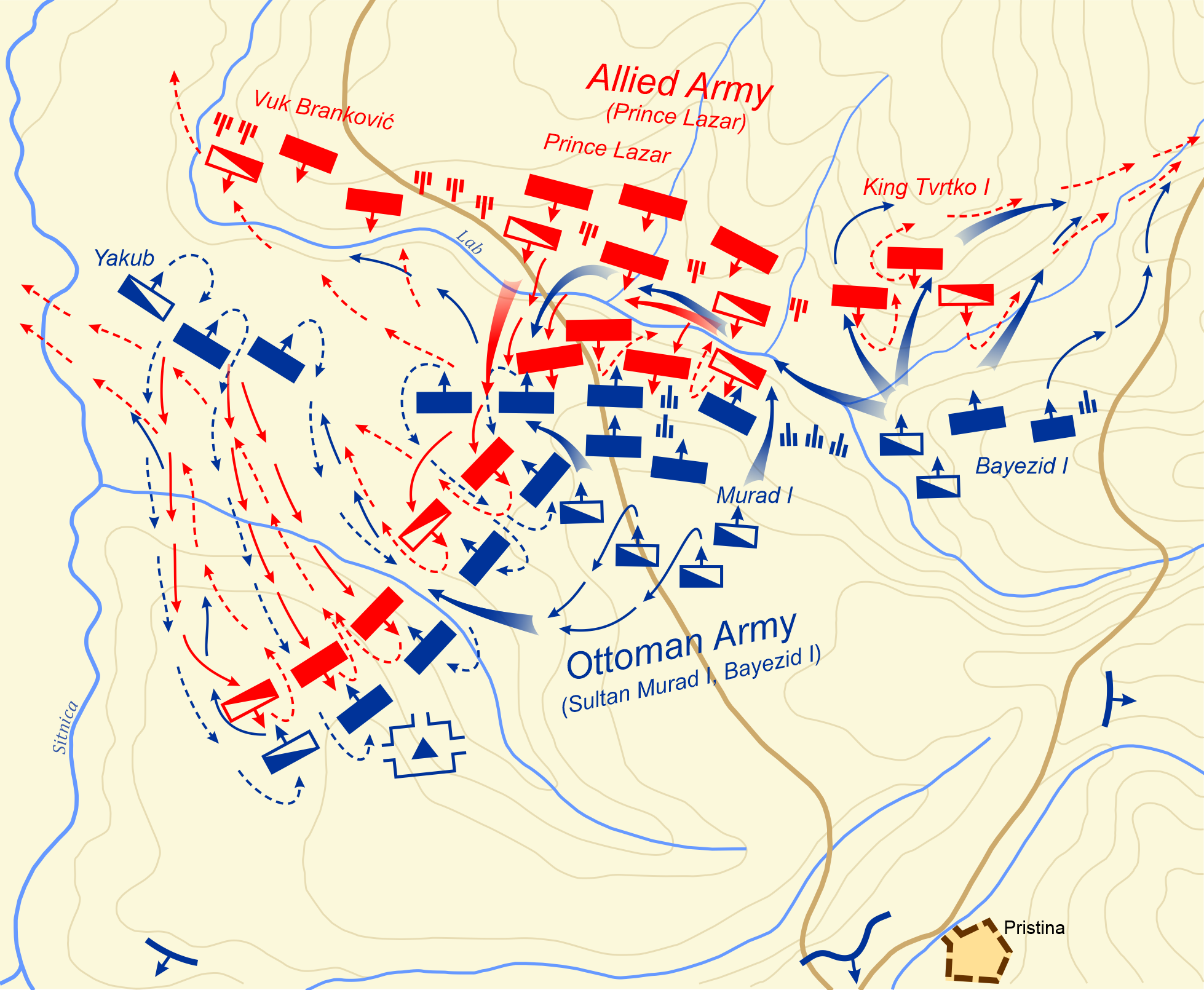
Plan of the battle

Serbian and Turkish accounts of the battle differ, making it difficult to reconstruct the course of events. It is believed that the battle commenced with Ottoman archers shooting at Serbian cavalry, who then made ready for the attack. After positioning in a wedge formation, the Serbian cavalry managed to break through the Ottoman left wing, but were not as successful against the center and the right wing.

The Serbs had the initial advantage after their first charge, which significantly damaged the Ottoman wing commanded by Yakub Çelebi. When the knights' charge was finished, light Ottoman cavalry and light infantry counterattacked and the Serbian heavy armor became a disadvantage. In the center, Serbian troops managed to push back Ottoman forces, except for Bayezid's wing, which barely held off the Bosnians commanded by Vlatko Vuković, who inflicted disproportionately heavy losses on the Ottomans. The Ottomans, in a ferocious counterattack led by Bayezid, pushed the Serbian forces back and then prevailed later in the day, routing the Serbian infantry. Both flanks still held, with Vuković's Bosnian troops drifting toward the center to compensate for the heavy losses inflicted on the Serbian infantry.

Historical facts say that Vuk Branković saw that there was no hope for victory and fled to save as many men as he could after Lazar was captured. In popular oral tradition, however, Branković is said to have fled and betrayed Lazar, a theory which was first presented by the writer Mavro Orbini in a 1601 work but is largely seen as unfounded. Sometime after Branković's retreat from the battle, the remaining Bosnian and Serb forces yielded the field, believing that a victory was no longer possible.

In one of the earliest accounts of the battle, it is described that twelve Serbian knights, known in Serbian epic poetry as the Jugović brothers, successfully breached the Ottoman defense. One of the knights, later identified as Miloš Obilić, pretended to have deserted to the Ottoman forces. When brought before Murad, Obilić pulled out a hidden dagger and killed the Sultan by slashing him. He was then killed by the Sultan's bodyguards. There are differing versions of the assassination however, with another version describing Obilić playing dead on the battlefield and stabbing the Sultan as he walked. It is also unclear when the assassination occurred, as some sources suggest it happened once the battle turned against the Serbs or in the immediate aftermath of the battle, while others describe it happening early on as Miloš sought to prove his loyalty to Prince Lazar after he was accused of treachery. The battle marked the only time in history an Ottoman Sultan was killed in battle.

== Aftermath ==
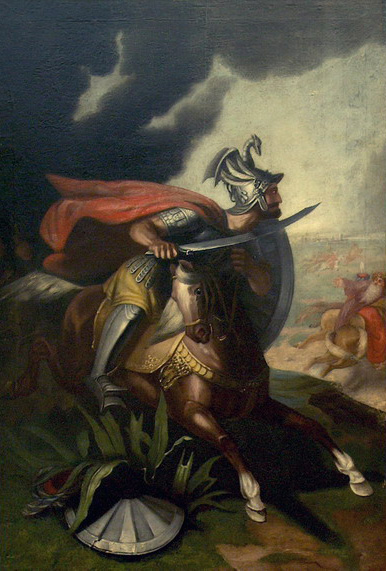
Miloš Obilić, the alleged assassin of Sultan Murad I.

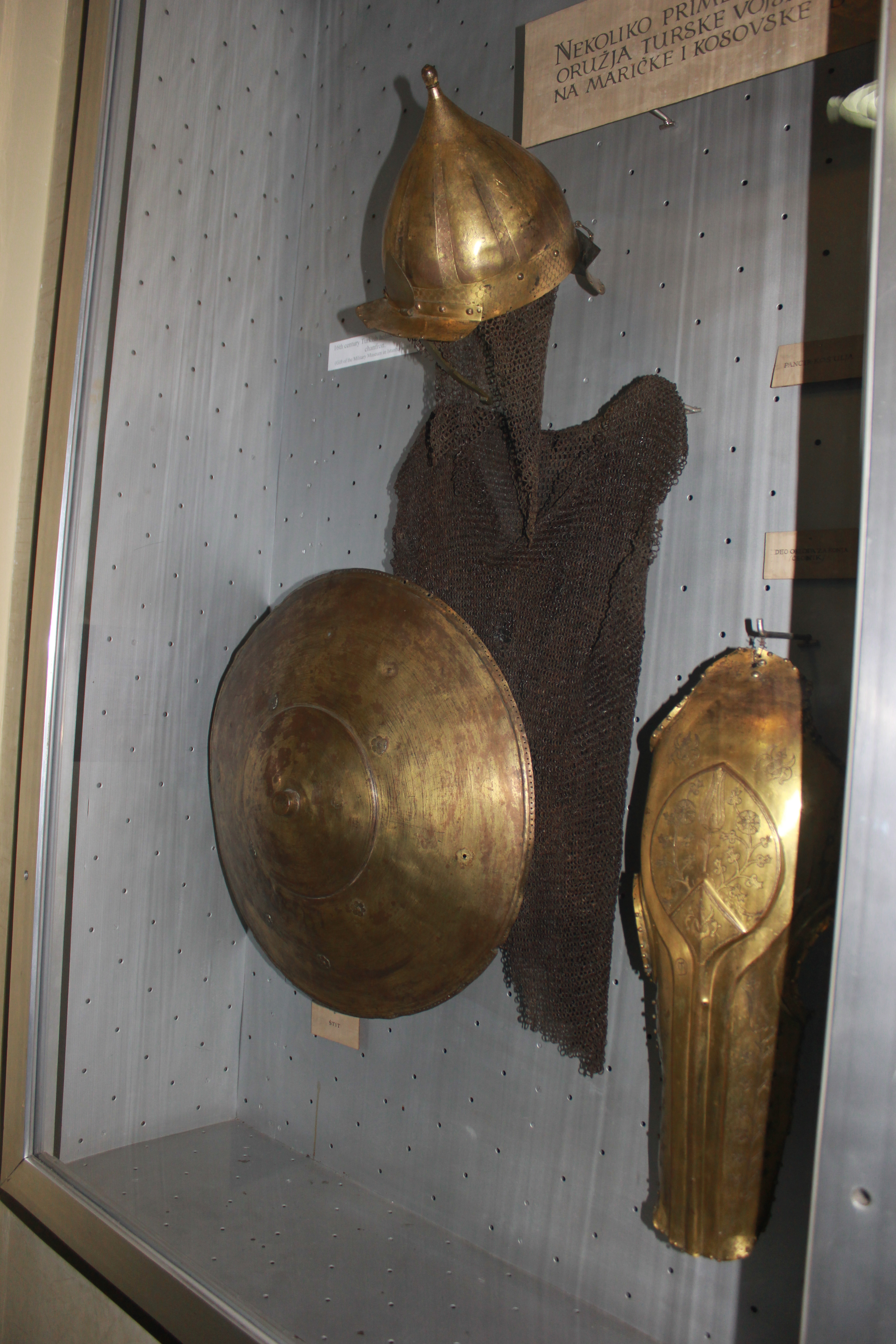
Turkish armor during battles of Marica and Kosovo.

=== Early reports ===
The event of the battle quickly became known in Europe. Not much attention was paid to the outcome in these early rumors which circulated, but they all focused on the fact that the Ottoman Sultan had been killed in the battle. Some of the earliest reports about the battle come from the court of Tvrtko of Bosnia who in separate letters to the senate of Trogir (August 1) and the council of Florence claimed that he had defeated the Ottomans in Kosovo. The response of the Florentines to Tvrtko (20 October 1389) is an important historical document as it confirms that Murad was killed during the battle and that it took place on June 28 (St. Vitus day/Vidovdan). The killer is not named, but it was one of 12 Serbian noblemen who managed to break through the Ottoman lines:

Fortunate, most fortunate are those hands of the twelve loyal lords who, having opened their way with the sword and having penetrated the enemy lines and the circle of chained camels, heroically reached the tent of Murat himself. Fortunate above all is that one who so forcefully killed such a strong vojvoda by stabbing him with a sword in the throat and belly. And blessed are all those who gave their lives and blood through the glorious manner of martyrdom as victims of the dead leader over his ugly corpse.

Another Italian account, Mignanelli's work of 1416, asserted that it was Lazar who killed the Ottoman sultan. The earliest detailed Ottoman account of the battle dates to 1512 by Neşri who exaggerated the size of Lazar's army and described the battle as a significant Ottoman victory.

=== Geopolitical consequences ===
Both armies were destroyed in the battle. Both Lazar and Murad lost their lives, and the remnants of their armies retreated from the battlefield. Murad's son Bayezid killed his younger brother, Yakub Çelebi, upon hearing of their father's death, thus becoming the sole heir to the Ottoman throne. The Serbs were left with too few men to defend their lands effectively, while the Turks had many more troops in the east. The immediate effect of the depletion of Serbian manpower was a shift in the stance of Hungarian policy towards Serbia. Hungary tried to exploit the effects of battle and expand in northern Serbia, while the Ottomans renewed their campaign in southern Serbia as early as 1390–1391. Domestically, the Serbian feudal class in response to these threats split in two factions. A northern faction supported a conciliatory, pro-Ottoman foreign policy as a means of defence of their lands against Hungary, while a southern faction which was immediately threatened by Ottoman expansion sought to establish a pro-Hungarian foreign policy. Some Serbian feudal lords continued to fight against the Ottomans and others were integrated in the Ottoman feudal hierarchy. Consequently, some of the Serbian principalities that were not already Ottoman vassals became so in the following years. These feudal lords – including the daughter of Prince Lazar – formed marriage ties with the new Sultan Bayezid.

In the wake of these marriages, Stefan Lazarević, Lazar's son, became a loyal ally of Bayezid, and contributed significant forces to many of Bayezid's future military engagements, including the Battle of Nicopolis, where Vuk Branković another Serbian magnate who ruled in parts of Kosovo had joined the anti-Ottoman coalition. As a reward for his contribution to the Ottoman victory, Lazarević was given a large part of Branković's lands. Branković himself died as an Ottoman prisoner, although in all later "Kosovo myth" narratives first created by Stefan Lazarević, he is portrayed as a betrayer of the Christians. Lazarević's success as an Ottoman vassal was such that eventually his lands encompassed a territory bigger than his father's and matched the territories of the Nemanjic dynasty in the 13th century. After Mehmed's death in 1421, Lazarević was one of the vassals who strongly supported the coalition against the future Mehmed the Conqueror who ultimately prevailed. This move led Mehmed to punish the Serbian and all other vassals who supported the other claimants to the throne by campaigning against them to directly annex their lands. In a series of campaigns from this era onward Serbia formally became an Ottoman province. The capture of Smederevo on 20 June 1459 marks the end of medieval Serbian statehood.

== Legacy ==
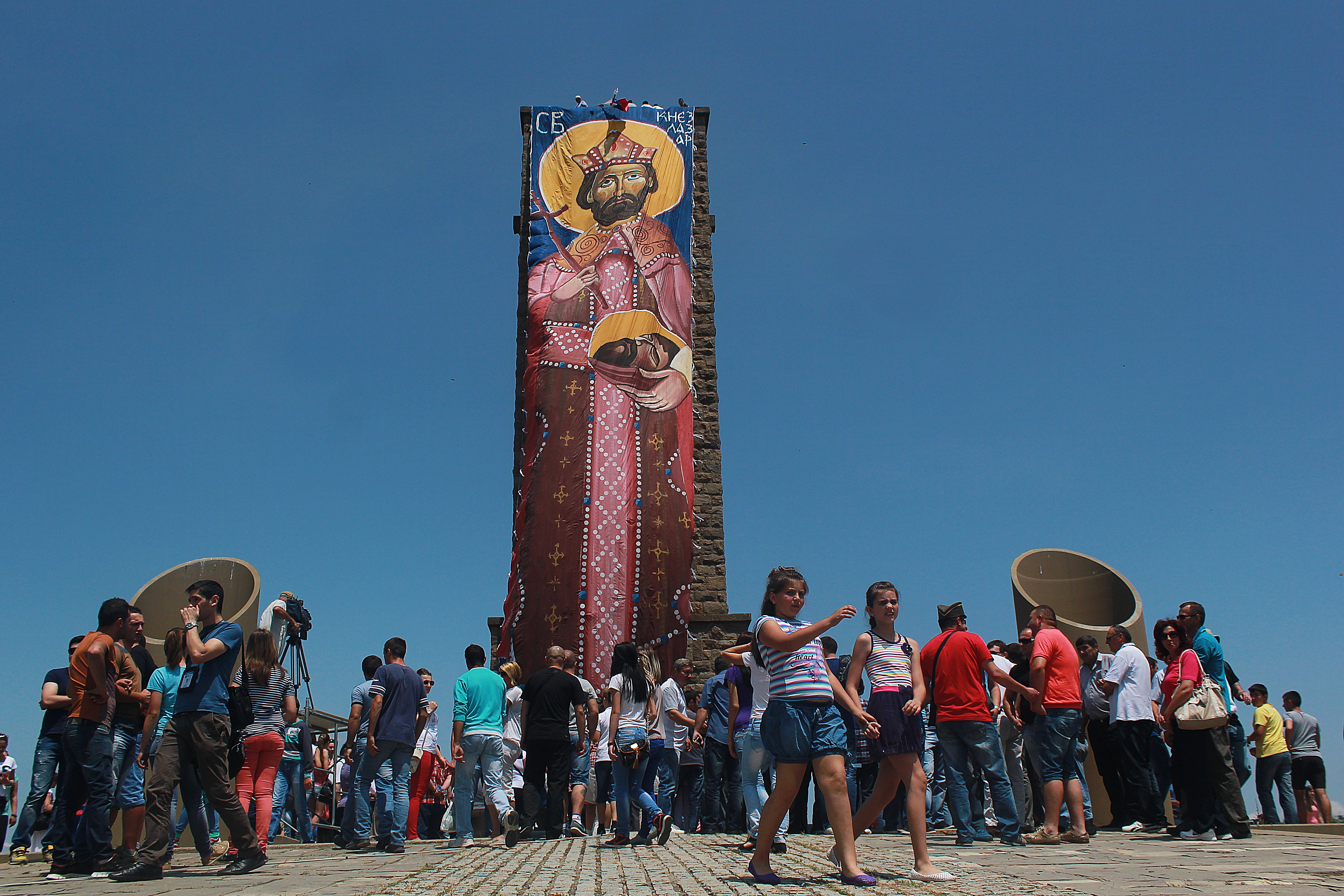
Serbs celebrating Vidovdan at the Gazimestan monument.

The Kosovo Myth has for a long time been a central subject in Serbian folklore and Serbian literary tradition, and for centuries was cultivated mostly in the form of oral epic poetry and guslar poems. The mythologization of the battle occurred shortly after the event. The legend was not fully formed immediately after the battle but evolved from different originators into various versions. The philologist Vuk Karadžić collected traditional epic poems related to the topic of the Battle of Kosovo and in the 19th century, he released the so-called "Kosovo cycle", which became the final version of the transformation of the myth. The modern narrativization of the legend focuses on three main motifs: sacrifice, betrayal and heroism, exemplified respectively by Prince Lazar choosing a "heavenly kingdom" over an "earthly kingdom", Vuk Branković's supposed desertion and Miloš Obilić's assassination of Murad.

In Serbian historiography, the complicated political setting preceding the battle has been simplified in the battle being a clash between Christianity and Islam. However, Miodrag Popović notes that in Ottoman Serbia of the 16th and 17th century, the local population was "Turkophilic" in accordance with the general climate of necessary adaptation to Ottoman rule. Тhey did not give the legend of the Battle of Kosovo an interpretation unfavorable or hostile to the Ottoman Turks. Perceptions about the Battle of Kosovo in Serbian public discourse changed and were "harnessed in earnest in the rise of Serbian nationalism during the 19th century" and acquired new meanings in the context of the Greater Serbia nationalist project. Many of the elements which came to be seen later in Serbian discourse as crucial elements of Serbian tradition appear to have entered the Serbian corpus about Kosovo just a few decades before 19th century Serbian folklorists recorded them. Throughout most of the 19th century it did not carry its later importance, as the Principality of Serbia saw the region of Bosnia as its core, not Kosovo. The Congress of Berlin (1878) was the event which caused the elevation of the narratives about the Battle of Kosovo ("Kosovo myth") in its modern status. The region of Bosnia was effectively handed out to Austria-Hungary and Serbian expansion towards that area was blocked, which in turn left southwards expansion towards Kosovo as the only available geopolitical alternative for the Serbian state. Today, the Battle of Kosovo has come to be seen in public discourse as "particularly important to Serbian history, tradition and national identity". The battle has become a force of historical, political, military and artistic inspiration to date.

The day of the battle, known in Serbian as Vidovdan (St. Vitus' day) and celebrated according to the Julian calendar (corresponding to 28 June Gregorian in the 20th and 21st centuries), is an important part of Serb ethnic and national identity, with notable events in Serbian history falling on that day: in 1876 Serbia declared war on the Ottoman Empire (Serbian–Ottoman War (1876–78); in 1881 Austria-Hungary and the Principality of Serbia signed a secret alliance; in 1914 the assassination of Archduke Franz Ferdinand of Austria was carried out by the Serbian Gavrilo Princip (although a coincidence that his visit fell on that day, Vidovdan added nationalist symbolism to the event); in 1921 King Alexander I of Yugoslavia proclaimed the Vidovdan Constitution; in 1989, on the 600th anniversary of the battle, Serbian president Slobodan Milošević delivered the Gazimestan speech on the site of the historic battle.

Epic songs about the battle also exist in Albanian historical folklore and have been preserved in local Kosovo Albanian culture. Albanian versions, which are part of the Albanian epic poetry of Kosovo, focus on the figure of Miloš Obilić (known as Millosh Kopiliqi in Albanian), as his birthplace is considered to have been in the Drenica region of Kosovo, where villages which bear the name Kopiliq are located.

== See also ==
- Battle of Dubravnica
- Battle of Pločnik
- Battle of Bileća
- Battle of Kosovo (1448)
- Gazimestan
- Kosovo curse

== Notes ==
1. Date: Some sources attempt to give the date as 28 June in the New-Style Gregorian calendar, but that was not adopted until 1582, and did not apply retrospectively (but see Proleptic Gregorian calendar). Moreover, the proleptic Gregorian date of the battle is 23 June, not 28. Nevertheless, anniversaries of the battle are still celebrated on June 15 Julian (Vidovdan, that is St. Vitus' Day in the calendar of the Serbian Orthodox Church, which is still Julian), which corresponds to 28 June Gregorian in the 20th and 21st centuries.

== Bibliography ==
- Budak, Neven (2001). "John of Palisna, the Hospitaller Prior of Varna". In Hunyadi, Zsolt; Laszlovszky, Jozsef (eds.). The Crusades and the Military Orders: Expanding the Frontiers of Medieval Latin Christianity. Central European University Press. ISBN 963-9241-42-3.
- Budak, Neven (4 January 2014). "Ivan od Paližne, prior vranski, vitez reda Sv. Ivana, Historijski zbornik 42 (1989), 57-70". Academia.edu.
- Cox, John K. (2002). The History of Serbia. Greenwood. ISBN 978-0-313-31290-8.
- Di Lellio, Anna (2013). "The field of the blackbirds and the battle for Europe". In Langenbacher, Eric; Niven, Bill; Wittlinger, Ruth (eds.). Dynamics of Memory and Identity in Contemporary Europe. Berghahn Books. pp. 149–165. ISBN 978-0-85745-577-2.
- Đorđević, Dimitrije (Spring 1990). "The role of St. Vitus Day in modern Serbian history" (PDF). Serbian Studies. 5 (3). North American Society for Serbian Studies: 33–40. Archived from the original (PDF) on 24 September 2015.
- Duijzings, Gerlachlus (January 2000). Religion and the Politics of Identity in Kosovo. C. Hurst & Co. ISBN 978-1-85065-392-9.
- Emmert, Thomas Allan (1990). Serbian Golgotha: Kosovo, 1389. East European Monographs. ISBN 978-0-88033-175-3.
- Emmert, Thomas (1991). "The Battle of Kosovo: Early Reports of Victory and Defeat". In Vucinich, Wayne; Emmert, Thomas (eds.). Kosovo: Legacy of a Medieval Battle (PDF). University of Minnesota Press. ISBN 99922-875-5-1. Archived from the original (PDF) on 1 March 2023.
- Emmert, Thomas (1996), "Milos Obilic and the Hero Myth", Journal of the North American Society for Serbian Studies, vol. 10, archived from the original on 13 February 2010
- Greenawalt, Alexander (2001). "Kosovo Myths: Karadžić, Njegoš, and the Transformation of Serb Memory" (PDF). Spaces of Identity. 31.
- Ramet, Sabrina P. (2011). Civic and Uncivic Values: Serbia in the Post-Milosevic Era. Central European University Press.
- Fine, John V. A. (1994). The Late Medieval Balkans: A Critical Survey from the Late Twelfth Century to the Ottoman Conquest. University of Michigan Press. ISBN 0-472-08260-4.
- Humphreys, Brendan (2013). The Battle Backwards A Comparative Study of the Battle of Kosovo Polje (1389) and the Munich Agreement (1938) as Political Myths (PDF) (Thesis).
- Kaser, Karl; Katschnig-Fasch, Elisabeth (2005). Gender and Nation in South Eastern Europe (in German). LIT Verlag Münster. ISBN 978-3-8258-8802-2.
- Malcolm, N. (1998). Kosovo: A Short History. Macmillan. ISBN 978-0-333-66612-8.
- Mihaljčić, Rade (1989). The Battle of Kosovo in history and in popular tradition. Beogradski izdavačko-grafički zavod. ISBN 9788613003663.
- Ognjenović, Gorana (2014). Politicization of Religion, the Power of Symbolism: The Case of Former Yugoslavia and its Successor States. Springer. ISBN 978-1137477897.
- Petta, Paolo (2000). Despoti d'Epiro e principi di Macedonia: esuli albanesi nell'Italia del Rinascimento (in Italian). Argo. ISBN 8882340287.
- Runciman, S.; Hunyadi, Z.; Laszlovszky, J. (2001). The Crusades and the Military Orders: Expanding the Frontiers of Medieval Latin Christianity. CEU Medievalia Series (in Italian). Department of Medieval Studies, Central European University. ISBN 978-963-9241-42-8.
- Sedlar, Jean W. (2013). East Central Europe in the Middle Ages, 1000–1500. University of Washington Press. ISBN 9780295800646.
- Uğurlu, Mesut (2011). "Kosova Efsanesi". Hacettepe Üniversitesi Türkiyat Araştırmaları (in Turkish). 14 (14): 241–252.
- Djokić, Dejan (2023). A Concise History of Serbia. Cambridge University Press. ISBN 9781139236140.

=== Further reading ===
- Bieber, Florian (2002). "Nationalist mobilization and stories of Serb suffering: The Kosovo myth from 600th anniversary to the present" (PDF). Rethinking History. 6 (1): 95–110. doi:10.1080/136425200110112137. S2CID 154628299.
- Ćirković, Sima (2004). The Serbs. Malden: Blackwell. ISBN 9781405142915.
- Ćirković, Sima M. (1990). Kosovska bitka u istoriografiji (in Serbian). Zmaj.
- Đerić, Branislav (1989). Kosovska bitka: vojno-istorijska rasprava (in Serbian). Naučna knjiga. ISBN 9788623020070.
- Elezović, Gliša (1940). Boj na Kosovu 1389 g. u istoriji Mula Mehmeda Nešrije (in Serbian). Štamp. "Luč".
- Kusovac, Nikola (1988). Kosovska bitka: mit, legenda i stvarnost (in Serbian). Litera.
- Lugar, Peter B (2005), The History and Effects of the Kosovo Polje Mythology (PDF), Army Command and General Staff College, archived (PDF) from the original on 4 July 2020
- Mišković, Jov (1933). Kosovska bitka 15. juna 1389. godine (in Serbian). Planeta.
- Ostojić, Tihomir (1901). Kosovo: narodne pesme o boju na Kosovu 1389. godine (in Serbian). Izd. Matice Srpske. p. 91.
- Tomac, Petar (1968). Kosovska bitka (in Serbian). Vojnoizdavački zavod.
