= Gazimestan speech =

June 1989 Slobodan Milošević speech

- Milošević delivering the speech
- Native name: Говор на Газиместану; Govor na Gazimestanu
- Date: 28 June 1989; 37 years ago
- Venue: Gazimestan, Kosovo field
- Location: Pristina, SAP Kosovo, SR Serbia, SFR Yugoslavia; 42°41′26″N 21°7′25″E
- Theme: 600th anniversary of the Battle of Kosovo, possibility of armed conflict
- Participants: Slobodan Milošević

The Gazimestan speech (Serbo-Croatian: Govor na Gazimestanu / Говор на Газиместану) was given on 28 June 1989 by Slobodan Milošević, then president of Serbia, at the Gazimestan monument on the Kosovo field. It was the centrepiece of a day-long event to mark the 600th anniversary of the Battle of Kosovo, which was fought at the site in 1389.

The speech was delivered to a crowd of an estimated million or more attendees, (Note: The actual size of the assembled crowd is unknown and unverifiable, but the estimates of a million and up to 1.5 million people are generally cited and accepted.) and came against a backdrop of protracted ethnic tension between ethnic Serbs and Albanians in Kosovo and increasing political tensions between SR Serbia and the other constituent republics of the then SFR Yugoslavia caused by the anti-bureaucratic revolution.

The speech has since become notorious for Milošević's reference to the possibility of "armed battles", in the future of Serbia's national development. Many foreign commentators have described this as presaging the collapse of Yugoslavia and the eventual Yugoslav Wars. Milošević later claimed that he had been misrepresented.

== Background ==
In the years leading up to the speech, Kosovo had become a central issue in Serbian politics. The province had been given extensive rights of autonomy in the 1974 Yugoslav Constitution and had been run by the province's majority-Albanian population. The reassertion of Albanian nationalism, discrimination against Serbs by the province's predominantly Albanian police force and local government, and a worsening economy led to a large number (around 100,000 between 1961–87) of Serbs and Montenegrins leaving the area by the late-1980s although there is no official, non-Serbian, data regarding that issue.

Milošević had used the issue to secure the leadership of the League of Communists of Serbia in 1987, and in early 1989, he pushed through a new constitution that drastically reduced the autonomy of Kosovo and the northern autonomous province of Vojvodina. This was followed by the mass replacement of opposing communist leaders in the provinces, called the Anti-bureaucratic revolution. Many Albanians were killed in March 1989 when demonstrations against the new constitution were violently suppressed by Serbian security forces. By June 1989, Kosovo was calm but its atmosphere was tense.

The speech was the climax of the commemoration of the 600th anniversary of the Battle of Kosovo. It followed months of commemorative events, which had been promoted by an intense media focus on the subject of Serbia's relationship with Kosovo. A variety of Serbian dramatists, painters, musicians and filmmakers had highlighted key motifs of the Kosovo legend, particularly the theme of the betrayal of Serbia. Public "Rallies for Truth" were organised by Kosovo Serbs between mid-1988 and early 1989 at which symbols of Kosovo were prominently displayed. The common theme was that Serbs outside Kosovo and outside Serbia itself should know the truth about the predicament of the Kosovo Serbs, emotionally presented as an issue of the utmost national importance. Serb-inhabited towns competed with each other to stage ever-more patriotic rallies to gain favour from the new "patriotic leadership", thus helping to further increase nationalist sentiments.

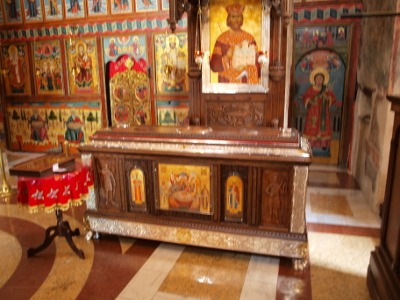
Tomb of Prince Lazar; his remains were carried in procession around Serb-inhabited territories in the months prior to the rally.

The event was also invested with major religious significance. In the months preceding the Gazimestan rally, the remains of Prince Lazar of Serbia, who had fallen in the Battle of Kosovo, were carried in a heavily-publicized procession around the Serb-inhabited territories of Yugoslavia. Throngs of mourners queued for hours to see the relics and attend commemorative public rallies, vowing in speeches never to allow Serbia to be defeated again. At the end of the tour, the relics were reinterred in the Gračanica Monastery in Kosovo, near Gazimestan.

The 28 June 1989 event was attended by a crowd estimated at between half-a-million and two million people (most estimates put the figure at around a million). They were overwhelmingly Serbs, many of whom had been brought to Gazimestan on hundreds of special coaches and trains organized by Milošević's League of Communists of Serbia. The attendees came from Serbia but also all of the Serb-inhabited parts of Yugoslavia and even from overseas. Around seven thousand diaspora Serbs from Australia, Canada and the United States also attended at the invitation of the Serbian Orthodox Church.

The speech was attended by a variety of dignitaries from the Serbian and Yugoslav establishment. They included the entire leadership of the Serbian Orthodox Church, led by German, Serbian Patriarch; the Prime Minister Ante Marković; members of the Presidency of the Central Committee of the League of Communists of Yugoslavia; the leadership of the Yugoslav People's Army; and members of the rotating Presidency of Yugoslavia. The event was boycotted by the Croatian member of the Presidency, Stipe Šuvar, as well as the United States ambassador and all ambassadors from the European Community and NATO countries with the exception of Turkey (which had a direct interest in the event as the successor state to the Ottoman Empire).

After being escorted through cheering crowds waving his picture alongside that of Lazar, Milošević delivered his speech on a huge stage with a backdrop containing powerful symbols of the Kosovo myth: images of peonies, a flower traditionally deemed to symbolize the blood of Lazar, and an Orthodox cross with a Cyrillic letter "S" (rendered as "С" in Cyrillic) at each of its four corners, standing for the slogan Само Слога Србина Спашaва (Samo Sloga Srbina Spašava, lit. 'Only Unity Saves the Serbs').

== Content ==
The message Milošević delivered in the speech was essentially one that he had already been promoting for some time. On 19 November 1988, he had told a "Brotherhood and Unity" rally in Belgrade: "None should be surprised that Serbia raised its head because of Kosovo this summer. Kosovo is the pure centre of its history, culture and memory. Every nation has one love that warms its heart. For Serbia it is Kosovo."'

A similar theme characterised his speech at Gazimestan. Anthropologist Edit Petrović comments that Milošević sought to combine "history, memory and continuity", promoting "the illusion that the Serbs who fought against the Turks in Kosovo in 1389 are somehow the same as the Serbs fighting for Serbian national survival today".

According to James Gow, the objective was to further Milošević's political campaign, which was "predicated on the notion of redressing this mood of victimisation and restoring the sense of Serbian pride and, most important of all, power".

At the beginning of the speech, Milošević mentioned the battle and concluded that it is "through the play of history of life" that "Serbia regained its state, national, and spiritual integrity" (referring to the constitutional changes that reduced autonomy of Serbia's provinces and strengthened the central rule) at the battle's anniversary. He continued by saying, "Today, it is difficult to say what is the historical truth about the Battle of Kosovo and what is legend. Today this is no longer important".

Milošević placed his speech in the context of the history of Yugoslavia since the World War II in which Serbia's influence had been restricted by constitutional arrangements, diluting its power. That had been a long-running controversy in Serbian politics, particularly after Kosovo and Vojvodina were granted influence over Serbia under the 1974 Yugoslav Constitution. Vjeran Pavlaković posited that Milošević sought to make "clear parallels between the Battle of Kosovo and the 1974 Yugoslav Constitution, both considered to be defeats in the Serbian national consciousness." He maintained that disunity among Serbian political leaders meant that they were "prone to compromise to the detriment of its own people, a compromise that "could not be accepted historically and ethically by any nation in the world ... here we are now at the field of Kosovo to say that this is no longer the case".

Milošević presented Serbian victimisation as the result of poor political leadership and spoke of how "the Serbian leadership [had] remained divided, prone to compromise to the detriment of its own people" and asserted:

"The fact that in this region they are a major nation is not a Serbian sin or shame; this is an advantage which they have not used against others, but I must say that here, in this big, legendary field of Kosovo, the Serbs have not used the advantage of being great for their own benefit either."

Milošević signalled that the passiveness would change:

"Thanks to their leaders and politicians and their vassal mentality they felt guilty before themselves and others. This situation lasted for decades, it lasted for years and here we are now at the field of Kosovo to say that this is no longer the case... Serbia of today is united and equal to other republics and prepared to do everything to improve its financial and social position and that of all its citizens. If there is unity, cooperation, and seriousness, it will succeed in doing so."

He stated:

"Serbs have never in the whole of their history conquered and exploited others. Their national and historical being has been liberational throughout the whole of history and through two world wars, as it is today. They liberated themselves and when they could they also helped others to liberate themselves."

Afterward, he spoke about unity and Serbian multiethnicity: he emphasised that "unity in Serbia will bring prosperity to the Serbian people in Serbia", and also to "each one of its citizens, irrespective of his national or religious affiliation".

Unity and equality to other republics will enable Serbia to "improve its financial and social position and that of all its citizens". Milošević said that in Serbia, apart from Serbs, "members of other peoples and nationalities also live in it.... This is not a disadvantage for Serbia. I am truly convinced that it is its advantage." He went say "Socialism in particular, being a progressive and just democratic society, should not allow" divisions among Yugoslav nations and their religions. He devoted a large part of the speech to the divisions by stating, "Yugoslavia is a multinational community and it can survive only under the conditions of full equality for all nations that live in it". However, "The crisis that hit Yugoslavia has brought about national divisions" although Yugoslavia "experienced the worst tragedy of national conflicts that a society can experience and still survive."

The middle of the speech took a markedly different line from the nationalist expressions which bookended it; Louis Sell describes it as sounding "as if it was written by his wife" (Mirjana Marković, who was known for her hardline communist views). Milošević praised the virtues of ethnic tolerance and socialism, describing how "the world is more and more marked by national tolerance, national cooperation and even national equality" and calling for equal and harmonious relations among the peoples of Yugoslavia. It was reportedly met with silence, bordering on restiveness, by the crowd.

After issuing a call for "unity, solidarity, and cooperation among people", Milošević delivered the speech's most controversial passage:

"Six centuries later, now, we are being again engaged in battles and are facing battles. They are not armed battles, although such things cannot be excluded yet. However, regardless of what kind of battles they are, they cannot be won without resolve, bravery, and sacrifice, without the noble qualities that were present here in the field of Kosovo in the days past. Our chief battle now concerns implementing the economic, political, cultural, and general social prosperity, finding a quicker and more successful approach to a civilization in which people will live in the 21st century."

In the final paragraph, Milošević addressed the relation between Serbia and Europe. He portrayed Medieval Serbia as the defender of its own territory and of all of Europe in the fight against the Ottomans: "Six centuries ago, Serbia heroically defended itself in the field of Kosovo, but it also defended Europe. Serbia was at that time the bastion that defended the European culture, religion, and European society in general".

Writer Arne Johan Vetlesen has commented that it was an appeal "to the values of Europe, meaning to Christianity, to modernity, to Civilization with a capital C, exploit[ing] Orientalist sentiments and help[ing] to amplify the Balkanism widespread in Western governments." and stressed, "In this spirit we now endeavor to build a society, rich and democratic, and thus to contribute to the prosperity of this beautiful country, this unjustly suffering country, but also to contribute to the efforts of all the progressive people of our age that they make for a better and happier world."

He concluded the speech with:

"Let the memory of Kosovo heroism live forever!
Long live Serbia!
Long live Yugoslavia!
Long live peace and brotherhood among peoples!"

== Reception ==
The speech was enthusiastically received by the crowds at Gazimestan, who were reported to have shouted "Kosovo is Serb". Some sang "Tsar Lazar, you were not lucky enough to have Sloba by your side" and dubbed Milošević Mali Lazar ("Little Lazar"), while others chanted "Europe, don't you remember that we defended you!" (referring to a key element of the Kosovo myth of Serbia sacrificing itself in defending Christian Europe against the encroaching Muslim Turks).

That was to be an important theme in Serbian nationalist rhetoric during the Yugoslav Wars: Thomas A. Emmert, writing in 1993, commented that since the day of the speech, "Serbs have not failed to remind themselves and the world that they are fighting for the very defense of Europe against Islamic fundamentalism. It matters little to them that Europeans and Americans do not perceive any need for defense."

Matija Bećković, a well-known poet and academic, praised the event as "the culmination of the Serb national revolt, in Kosovo as the equator of the Serb planet.... On this six hundredth anniversary of the Kosovo battle, we must emphasise that Kosovo is Serbia; and that this is a fundamental reality, irrespective of Albanian birth rates and Serb mortality rates. There is so much Serb blood and Serb sanctity there that Kosovo will remain Serbian even if there is not a single Serb left there.... It is almost surprising that all Serbian land is not called by the name of Kosovo".

Politika, a Belgrade newspaper, reprinted Milošević's speech in full in a special edition dedicated entirely to Kosovo. It asserted in an editorial, "We are once more living in the times of Kosovo, as it is in Kosovo and around Kosovo that the destiny of Yugoslavia and the destiny of socialism are being determined. They want to take away from us the Serbian and the Yugoslav Kosovo, yes, they want to, but they will not be allowed to." Janez Drnovšek, the Slovene member of the Yugoslav collective presidency, sat next to Milošević during the ceremony and later described the Serbian president's mood as "euphoric".

Although many Serbs gave the speech a warm welcome, it was regarded warily in the other Yugoslav nations as well as by anti-Milošević Serbs. The nationalist sentiments expressed by Milošević were a major break with the late Yugoslav president Josip Broz Tito's anti-nationalist approach and, as Robert Thomas commented, "it effectively acted as a symbolic repudiation of the Titoist legacy". Milošević's claim that Serbs "liberated themselves and when they could they also helped others to liberate themselves" was seen by some as a commitment to a forcible redrawing of Yugoslavia's internal borders to create a Greater Serbia. Concerns about an underlying agenda were heightened by the presence at the event of the Serbian Orthodox bishop from Dalmatia in Croatia, who gave a keynote speech in which he compared Dalmatia to Kosovo and concluded that both had made the same vow to Milošević.

British journalist Marcus Tanner, who attended Gazimestan, reported that "representatives [of Slovenia and Croatia]... looked nervous and uncomfortable" and commented that the outpouring of Serbian nationalist sentiment had "perhaps permanently destroyed any possibility of a settlement in Kosovo." The nervousness was reflected in a television news report on the speech in Slovenia that noted:

"And whatever significance the Kosovo battle may have in the national and intimate consciousness of the Serbs, the festivities at Gazimestan again confirmed that it will be more and more difficult to face Serbian conduct and wishes, for it seems that the Serbs won a significant victory in Kosovo today and they made it known that it was not the last one. The feeling of belonging, of unity, power and almost blind obedience of the million-fold crowd and all the others from this republic of Serbian or Montenegrin origin who may not have attended the gathering, are the elements in shaping a sharp and unyielding policy."

International media such as the UK newspaper The Independent noted the unprecedented nature of the event and the radical departure that it represented from the anti-nationalist ideology espoused under Tito. Although the speech's advocacy of mutual respect and democracy was described as "unexpectedly conciliatory", the contrast between Milošević's rhetoric and the reality of his widely-criticized policies towards the Kosovo Albanians was also noted.

Many commentators have interpreted the speech in hindsight as a coded declaration by Milošević that he was willing to use force to advance Serbia's interests; Tim Judah speculated that Milošević perhaps referred to "armed battles" in a "bid to intimidate the other Yugoslav leaders, who because of protocol were forced to attend". Milan Milošević (no relation to Slobodan Milošević) commented that Slobodan "did not have in mind the later wars in Croatia and Bosnia-Herzegovina. He was thinking of Kosovo itself." However, Slobodan rejected this view at the International Criminal Tribunal for the former Yugoslavia in 2002 and 2005:

"[N]one of the people that I talked to spoke of any warmongering attitude, nothing of the kind. On the contrary, this was a speech of peace, encouraging people to live together in harmony, all of the nationalities, the Turks, Gorani, Ashkali living in Kosovo, as well as throughout the entire Yugoslavia."

Addressing his use of the phrase "armed battles", he said:

"That is an ordinary type of sentence that everybody uses today because peace has still not become a stable, secure category in the present day world, in the modern day world. And if that were not so, why do states have armies?"

== List of notable attendees ==
- Serbian Patriarch German II
- Metropolitan Amfilohije Radović
- Metropolitan Franc Perko
- Momir Bulatović
- Janez Drnovšek (chairman of the Yugoslav Presidency)
- Milo Đukanović
- Slobodan Gligorijević (speaker of the Yugoslav Assembly)
- Petar Gračanin (interior minister)
- Borisav Jović
- Veljko Kadijević (defence minister)
- Mihalj Kertes
- Branko Kostić
- Budimir Lončar (foreign minister)
- Desanka Maksimović
- Ante Marković (Prime Minister of Yugoslavia)
- Naser Orić (security)
- Milan Pančevski (chairman of the Central Committee of the SKJ)
- Obrad Piljak
- Jovica Stanišić (head of security)
- Janez Stanovnik
