= Gazimestan =

Memorial site to the Battle of Kosovo (1389)

- Газиместан; Gazimestani
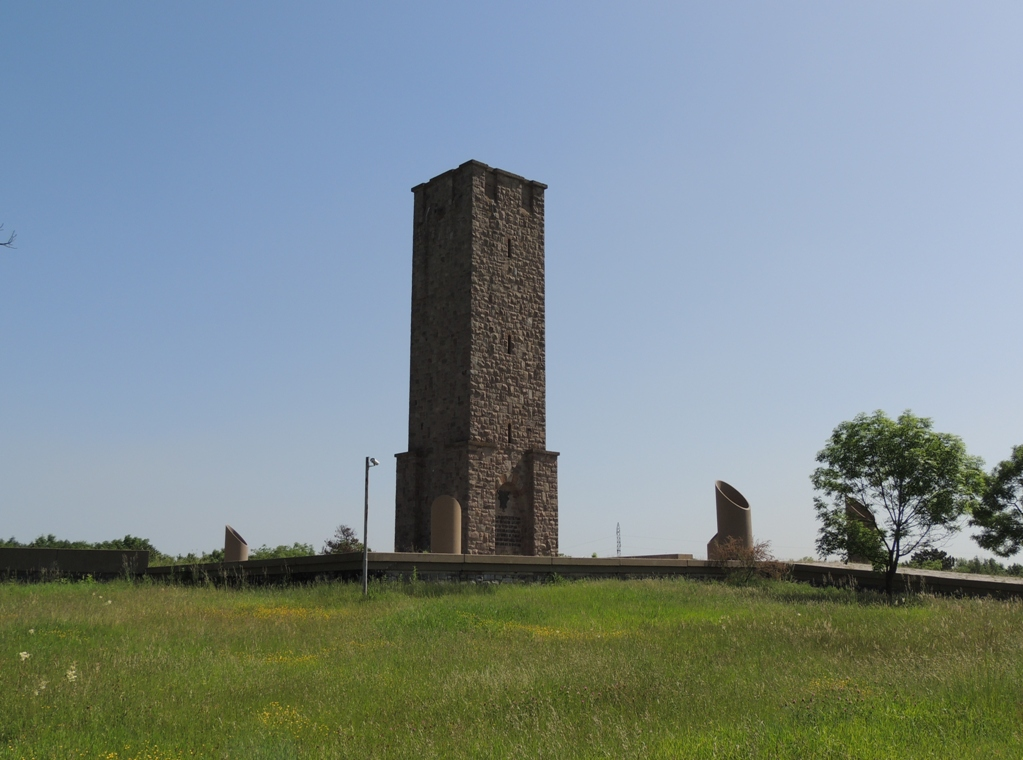
- Gazimestan monument
- Interactive map of Gazimestan
- Location: 5 km (3.1 mi) from Pristina, Kosovo
- Coordinates: 42°41′26″N 21°7′25″E
- Designer: Aleksandar Deroko
- Type: memorial, tower
- Material: stone
- Height: 25 m (82 ft)
- Completion date: 1953
- Dedicated to: fallen Serbian soldiers at the Battle of Kosovo (1389)

Gazimestan (Serbian Cyrillic: Газиместан, Serbian pronunciation: [ɡaziměstaːn], Albanian: Gazimestani) is the name of a memorial site and monument commemorating the Battle of Kosovo (1389), situated about 6–7 kilometres southeast of the actual battlefield, known as the Kosovo field. Gazimestan is accessible from the Pristina–Mitrovica highway, on a 50-metre-high hill above the plain, ca. 5 km northwest of Pristina. Every year, on Vidovdan (St. Vitus Day), 28 June, a commemoration is held by the monument, which in later years is also covered by an image of Prince Lazar, who led the Serbian army at the Battle of Kosovo.

== Name ==
Gazimestan derives from the Arabic word ghazi 'hero, holy warrior' (via Ottoman Turkish) and the Serbian word mesto 'place'.

== History ==
Commemorations of the Battle of Kosovo at Gazimestan became more prominent and significant after the founding of the Kingdom of Serbs, Croats, and Slovenes in 1919. A memorial park was constructed there after 1924.

In 1989, on the 600th anniversary of the Battle of Kosovo, Serbian president Slobodan Milošević gave the famous and controversial speech Gazimestan speech, which has been called the starting point of the disintegration of Yugoslavia.

In 1997 the site was declared a cultural heritage of Serbia. Large numbers of Serbs gather at the monument to commemorate Vidovdan. Violent protests by the Kosovo Albanian community have sometimes occurred during these gatherings.

== Monument ==
The Gazimestan monument was designed by Aleksandar Deroko and built in 1953 on the order of the Serbian communist government. The monument connected the "fighting tradition" of the Serbian people with the modern-day victory of the communist revolution. It is designed in the form of a medieval tower. The inside bears inscriptions with excerpts from folk poetry about the Battle of Kosovo. Its design prompted a debate on architectural style: modernist critics, represented by the writer Živorad Stojković, saw it as incompatible with the times and reminiscent of the architectural style favored under the Kingdom of Yugoslavia. Later, the Kosovo curse, which was recorded by the 19th-century folklorist Vuk Karadžić and which curses any Serb who does not fight at Kosovo, was also included in Cyrillic letters on the monument. Nowadays, the monument is under constant guard by police and is surrounded by a high fence. It has been claimed that the monument was deliberately targeted for bombing and damaged during the NATO bombing of Yugoslavia; however, an investigation by academics András Riedlmayer and Andrew Herscher published in 2001 found that any damage observed "was not consistent with anything that could have been caused by an aerial attack." The staircase inside of the monument was reportedly damaged by an explosive after the Kosovo War.

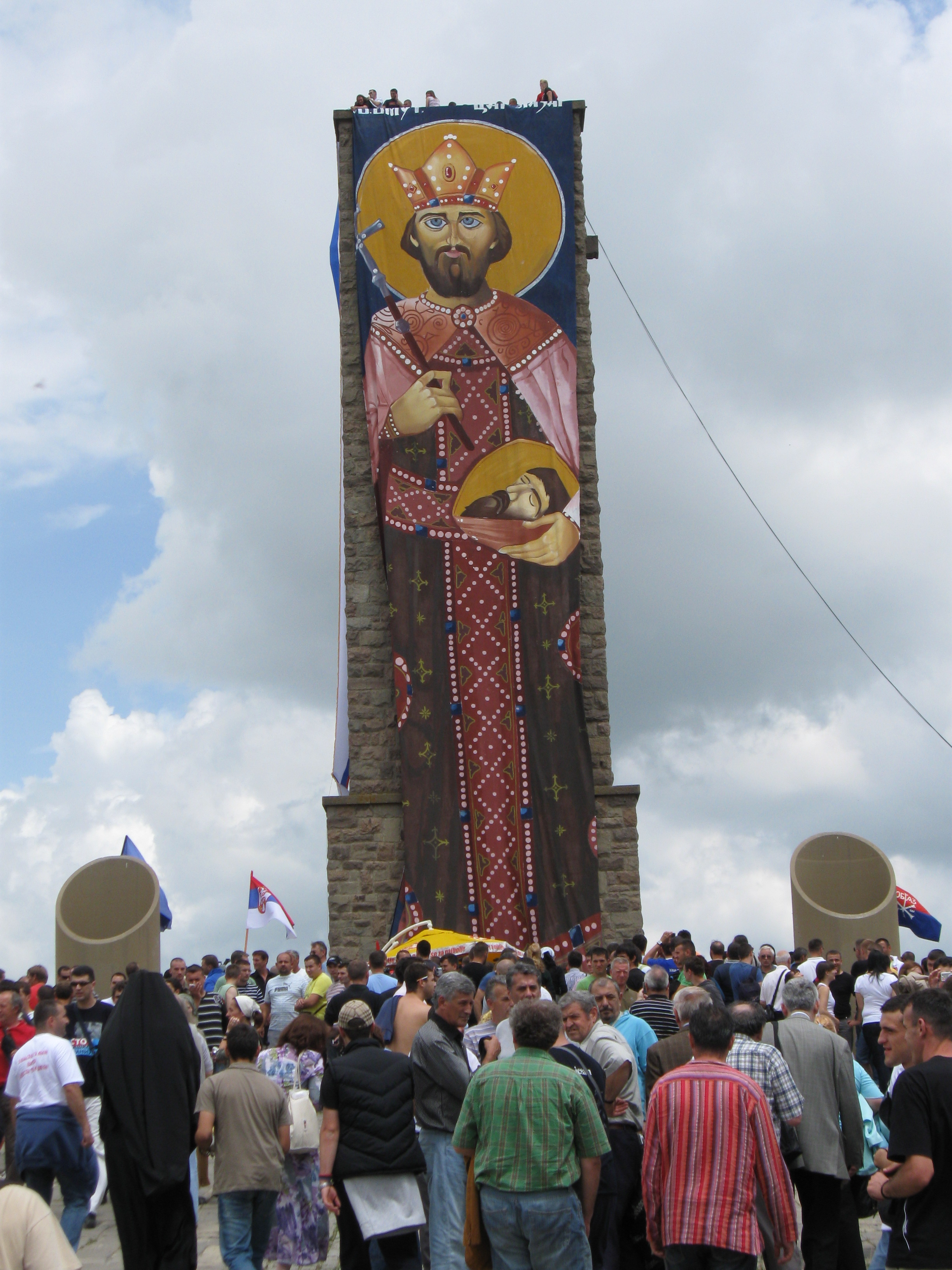
Vidovdan 2009

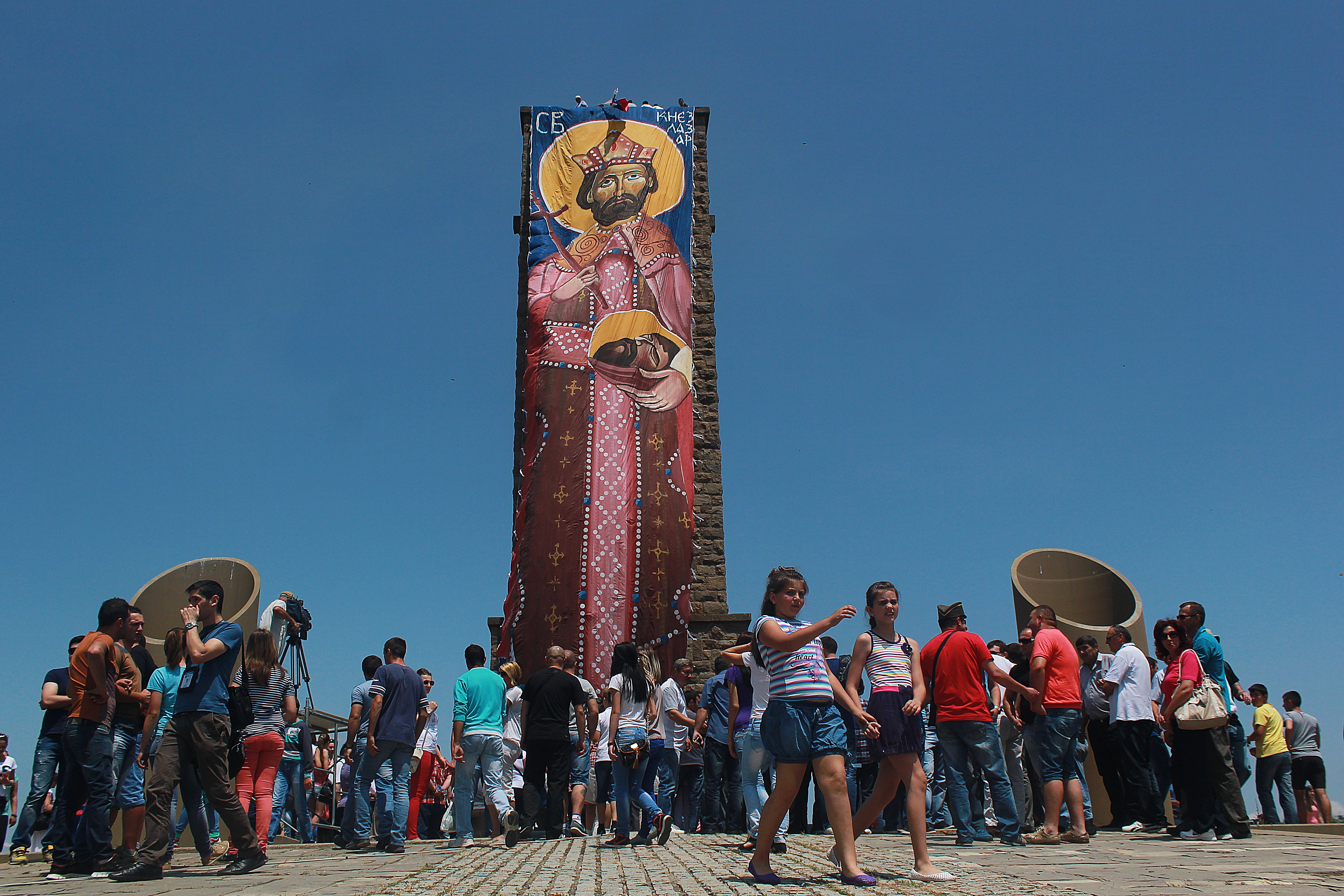
Vidovdan 2013

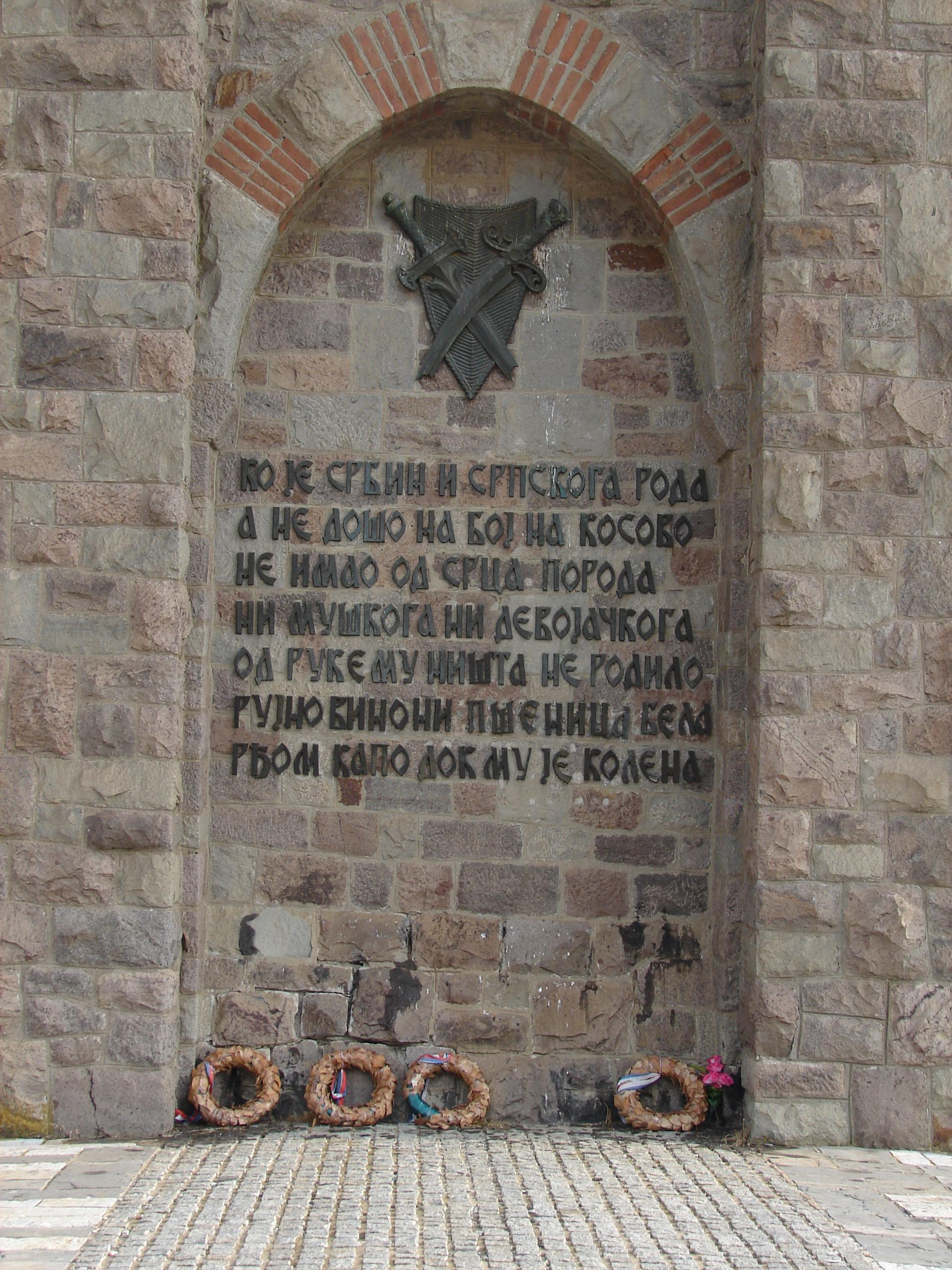
Kosovo curse

== Stone ==
Gazimestan
- Газиместан камен Gazimestan kamen
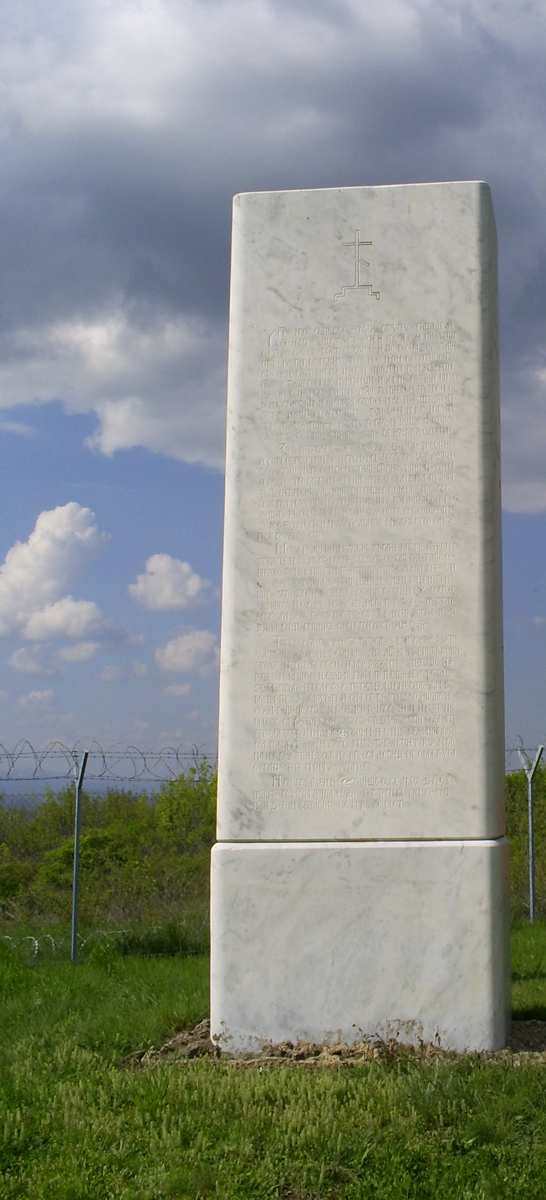
- A pillar in Gazimestan, on which the text of Stefan Lazarevic is carved
- Interactive map of Gazimestan

The Gazimestan stone (Serbian: Газиместан камен, romanized: Gazimestan kamen) is a record of the Battle of Kosovo in 1389, which is believed to have been composed by Prince Lazar's son and heir, Stefan. The inscription was carved into a stone pillar, which after the Battle of Ankara (1402) was placed in Gazimestan, the scene of the battle. Today, this text is engraved on a small stone pillar, which is located next to the Monument in Gazimestan.

It is a laudatory poem written in the form of an apostrophe, in which can be seen the influence of church poetry, but which also has distant echoes of chivalric epics.

The text is addressed to the intending traveler, and its beginning is taken from an ancient epigraph and reads: "Man who enters Serbian land". It glorifies the courage and spirituality of Prince Lazar, who represents the pinnacle of human spirituality. His people shine like bright stars, like the earth with colorful flowers, dressed in gold and adorned with precious stones. This kind of depiction of the Serbian army in the Kosovo War will appear later in the folk epic (in the poem Tsar Lazar and Tsarina Milica), but also in modern poetry (by Rakić in the poem Na Gazimestanu). The text reads in Serbian:

Cyrillic script

Човече који српском земљом ступаш,
било да си дошљак или овдашњи,
ма ко да си и ма шта да си,
када дођеш на поље ово,
које се зове Косово,
по свему ћеш угледати пуно костију мртвих,
те са њима и камену природу,
мене крстозначног као стег,
видећеш како посред поља управно стојим.
Да не проминеш и да не превидиш
као нешто залудно и ништавно,
но молим те, приђи и приближи се мени, о љубими,
и размотри речи које ти преносим,
и из тога ћеш разумети због ког узрока
и како и зашто ја стојим овде,
јер истину ти говорим,
ништа мање од живога,
да ћу вам изнети у суштини све што се збило.
Овде негда бејаше велики самодржац,
чудо земаљско и рига српски,
звани Лазар, кнез велики,
побожности непоколебими стуб,
доброразумља пучина и мудрости дубина,
огњени ум и заштитник странаца,
хранитељ гладних и миловање ништих,
скрбних миловање и утешитељ,
који воли све што хоће Христос,
коме иде сам по својој вољи
и са свима својим безбројним мноштвом,
колико је под руком његовом.
Мужеви добри, мужеви храбри,
мужеви, ваистину, у речи и у делу
који се блистају као звезде светле,
као земља цветовима шареним,
одевени златом и камењем драгим украшени,
многи коњи изабрани и златоседлани,
сведивни и красни коњаници њихови.
Свеплеменитих и славних
као какав добри пастир и заштитник,
мудро приводи духовне јагањце
да у Христу добро скончају
и приме мучења венац
и вишње славе учесници буду.
И тако сложно велико безбројно мноштво
скупа с добрим и великим господином,
добром душом и вером најтврђом,
као на красну дворану и многомирисану храну
на непријатеља се устремише
и праву змију згазише
и умртвише дивљу звер и великог противника
и неситога ада свејадца,
велим Амурата и сина његова,
аспидин и гујин пород,
штене лавово и василсково,
па са њима и не мало других.
О чудеса Божијих судбина,
ухваћен би храбри страдалац
безаконим агаренским рукама
и крај страдању добро сам прима
и мученик Христов постаје
велики кнез Лазар.
Не посече га нико други, о љубими,
до сама рука тога убице, сина Амуратова,
И све ово речено сврши се
лета 6897, индикта 12, месеца 15, у дан уторак,
а час је био шести или седми,
не знам, Бог зна.

Latin script

Čoveče koji srpskom zemljom stupaš,
bilo da si došljak ili ovdašnji,
ma ko da si i ma šta da si,
kada dođeš na polje ovo,
koje se zove Kosovo,
po svemu ćeš ugledati puno kostiju mrtvih,
te sa njima i kamenu prirodu,
mene krstoznačnog kao steg,
videćeš kako posred polja upravno stojim.
Da ne promineš i da ne previdiš
kao nešto zaludno i ništavno,
no molim te, priđi i približi se meni, o ljubimi,
i razmotri reči koje ti prenosim,
i iz toga ćeš razumeti zbog kog uzroka
i kako i zašto ja stojim ovde,
jer istinu ti govorim,
ništa manje od živoga,
da ću vam izneti u suštini sve što se zbilo.
Ovde negda bejaše veliki samodržac,
čudo zemaljsko i riga srpski,
zvani Lazar, knez veliki,
pobožnosti nepokolebimi stub,
dobrorazumlja pučina i mudrosti dubina,
ognjeni um i zaštitnik stranaca,
hranitelj gladnih i milovanje ništih,
skrbnih milovanje i utešitelj,
koji voli sve što hoće Hristos,
kome ide sam po svojoj volji
i sa svima svojim bezbrojnim mnoštvom,
koliko je pod rukom njegovom.
Muževi dobri, muževi hrabri,
muževi, vaistinu, u reči i u delu
koji se blistaju kao zvezde svetle,
kao zemlja cvetovima šarenim,
odeveni zlatom i kamenjem dragim ukrašeni,
mnogi konji izabrani i zlatosedlani,
svedivni i krasni konjanici njihovi.
Sveplemenitih i slavnih
kao kakav dobri pastir i zaštitnik,
mudro privodi duhovne jaganjce
da u Hristu dobro skončaju
i prime mučenja venac
i višnje slave učesnici budu.
I tako složno veliko bezbrojno mnoštvo
skupa s dobrim i velikim gospodinom,
dobrom dušom i verom najtvrđom,
kao na krasnu dvoranu i mnogomirisanu hranu
na neprijatelja se ustremiše
i pravu zmiju zgaziše
i umrtviše divlju zver i velikog protivnika
i nesitoga ada svejadca,
velim Amurata i sina njegova,
aspidin i gujin porod,
štene lavovo i vasilskovo,
pa sa njima i ne malo drugih.
O čudesa Božijih sudbina,
uhvaćen bi hrabri stradalac
bezakonim agarenskim rukama
i kraj stradanju dobro sam prima
i mučenik Hristov postaje
veliki knez Lazar.
Ne poseče ga niko drugi, o ljubimi,
do sama ruka toga ubice, sina Amuratova,
I sve ovo rečeno svrši se
leta 6897, indikta 12, meseca 15, u dan utorak,
a čas je bio šesti ili sedmi,
ne znam, Bog zna.

English translation

== See also ==
- Kosovo Myth

== Sources ==
- Čolović, Ivan (2016). "The Kosovo Myth". Yuhistorija.com.
- Ejdus, Filip (2020). "The Construction of Kosovo as Serbia's Ontic Space". Crisis and Ontological Insecurity. Cham: Palgrave Macmillan. pp. 39–63. doi:10.1007/978-3-030-20667-3_3. ISBN 978-3-030-20666-6.
- Marković, Dragan (1989). "Svečanosti na Gazimestanu o Vidovdanu između dva svetska rata" (PDF). Etnološke sveske. 10: 127–134. Archived from the original (PDF) on 2021-03-04.
- Wollentz, Gustav (2020). Landscapes of Difficult Heritage. Palgrave Studies in Cultural Heritage and Conflict. Cham: Palgrave Macmillan. ISBN 978-3-030-57124-5.

== Bibliography ==
- Ђорђић, Петар (1971). Историја српске ћирилице: Палеографско-филолошки прилози (1st ed.). Београд: Завод за издавање уџбеника.
