= Kosovo curse =

Legendary 14th-century curse on Serbians unwilling to fight the Ottomans

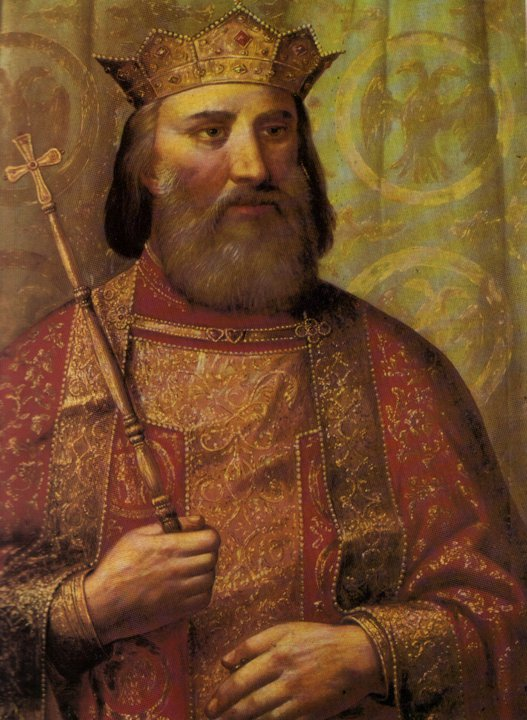
Prince Lazar, the original speaker of the curse

The Kosovo curse (Serbian: Косовска клетва / Kosovska kletva) or Prince's curse (Serbian: Кнежева клетва / Kneževa kletva), is according to legend, a curse said by Serbian Saint Lazar Hrebeljanović before the Battle of Kosovo in 1389, cursing Serbs who ignored his call for war against the Ottoman Empire.

== Origins ==
According to legend, the Kosovo curse originates from the Battle of Kosovo in 1389. The Serbian prince Saint Lazar Hrebeljanović spoke the words, cursing those Serbs who ignored his call for war against the Ottoman Empire. His contemporary, Constantine of Kostenets, recorded that Lazar issued an "invitation and threat" to Serbian states which is preserved in the Serbian epic poetry in the form of a curse.

From 1778 to 1781, Avram Miletić composed a miscellany of 129 songs (Serbian: Песмарица/Pesmarica) which also included the song "A history of Musić Stefan" containing a form of the Kosovo curse. One form of the curse appeared in the 1845 edition of the collection of Serbian folk songs by Vuk Karadžić. It is an updated version of a 1813 text by Karadžić with stronger nationalist overtones.

Karadžić's "Kosovo curse" is inscribed on the Gazimestan monument, where the 1389 Battle of Kosovo was fought.

== Text of the curse ==
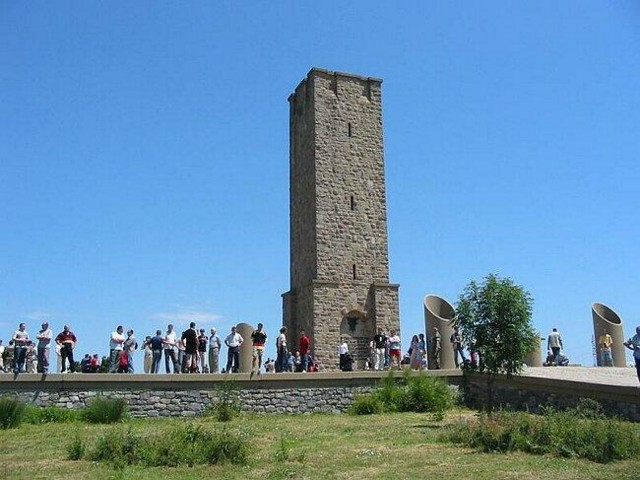
Gazimestan monument

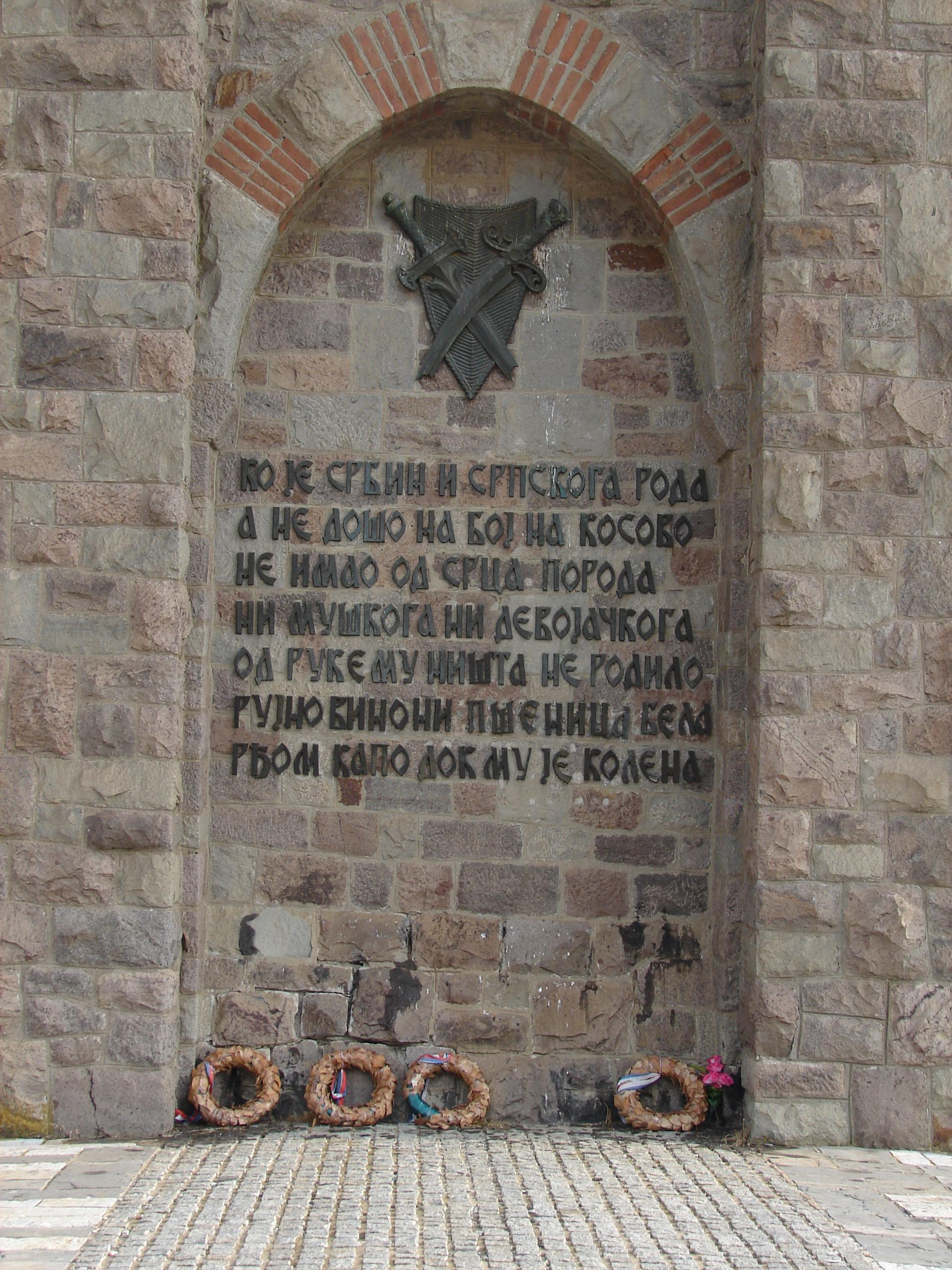
Gazimestan monument

Serbian Cyrillic
Ко је Србин и српскога рода,

и од српске крви и колена,
а не дош'о на бој на Косово,
не имао од срца порода,
ни мушкога ни девојачкога!
Од руке му ништа не родило,
рујно вино ни пшеница бела!
Рђом капо док му је колена!

Serbian Latin
Ko je Srbin i srpskoga roda,

i od srpske krvi i kolena,
a ne doš'o na boj na Kosovo,
ne imao od srca poroda,
ni muškoga ni devojačkoga!
Od ruke mu ništa ne rodilo,
rujno vino ni pšenica bela!
Rđom kapo dok mu je kolena!

English
Whoever is Serb, of Serbian blood and line,

and did not march to Kosovo in time,
may his heart bear no seed, no name,
neither son nor daughter born to his shame!
From his hand let nothing living shine,
no red wine flow, no white grain fine!
Let rust drip down through all his kin,
and rot his line for his sin!

== See also ==
- Miloš Obilić
- Onamo, 'namo!
- Serbian epic poetry
