= Bertrando de Mignanelli =

Italian merchant and writer (1370 – 1455 or 1460)

- Born: 1370; Siena, Republic of Siena
- Died: 1455 or 1460
- Occupation: merchant
- Relatives: father Leonard de Mignanelli
- Writing career
- Notable work: Vita Tamerlani [Life of Tamerlane] (1416)

Bertrando de Mignanelli or Beltramo Mignanelli di Siena (1370 – 1455 or 1460) was an adventurous and multilingual Italian merchant who lived in Damascus at the beginning of the 15th century and wrote the only Latin language primary source about Tamerlane's conquest of Damascus.

== Life ==
Bertrando's father Leonard de Mignanelli was a member of the nobility of Siena. At a very young age Mignanelli left Siena and traveled extensively around the Middle East before settling in Damascus and starting his successful trading business.

In some sources he is mentioned as a Catholic priest. Although he was a committed Christian his work does not contain much religious bias.

== Works ==
He personally knew Sultan Barquq and spoke Arabic. After he returned to Italy in 1416 he wrote a biography of Barquq and valuable testimony of Timur's capture of the Mamluk region of Syria in 1400—1401. He wrote his works based on what he had heard about the conquest because he fled to Jerusalem during the siege of Damascus and spent the winter of 1400/1401 there. After he heard that Damascus had been destroyed, he joined the retreating Mamluk Egyptian army commanded by Faraj ibn Barquq and went to Cairo and Alexandria with a servant.

In his works he also mentions the Battle of Kosovo because he makes a parallel between the conduct of Stefan Lazarević during the Battle of Angora and his father Prince Lazar of Serbia during the Battle of Kosovo. Like many other early Western sources, Mignanelli believed that the Christian Serbian army was victorious. In his 1416 work Mignanelli asserted that the Ottoman sultan Murad I was killed by Prince Lazar himself.

Mignanelli died in 1460.
