= Arne Johan Vetlesen =

Norwegian philosopher (born 1960)

Arne Johan Vetlesen (born 10 September 1960) is a Norwegian professor of philosophy at the University of Oslo, who concentrates on the topic of ethics, environmental philosophy and social philosophy.

He took the cand.mag. (similar to BA) degree in sociology and anthropology, before studying at the Johann Wolfgang Goethe University Frankfurt am Main from 1985 to 1990 under the guidance of Jürgen Habermas. He took the dr.philos. degree at the University of Oslo in 1993. Before becoming a full professor at the University of Oslo in 1998, Vetlesen worked as a research fellow and associate professor. He is a member of the Norwegian Academy of Science and Letters.

Vetlesen works interdisciplinary, often combining his philosophical theses with insights from psychology, sociology and anthropology. He is the author of more than twenty books on diverse topics such as environmental philosophy, moral philosophy, hermeneutics and psychoanalysis, social philosophy, consumerism and capitalism. His books in English include Cosmologies of the Anthropocene (2019), The Denial of Nature (2015), A Philosophy of Pain (2009), Evil and Human Agency (2005), Perception, Empathy, and Judgment (1994), and Closeness (1997).

== Works ==
Evil and Human Agency is a 2005 book written by Arne Johan Vetlesen. Vetlesen combines philosophical, sociological, and psychological approaches in order to contend that evil is defined by its intentionality and harmfulness and to investigate why people commit acts of organized evil. He uses Hannah Arendt and Zygmunt Bauman as his main sources.

=== Summary ===
Vetlesen focuses on large-scale acts of evil such as the Holocaust and former Yugoslavia's “ethnic cleansing” in order to investigate how human agency allows an individual to cause harm to another intentionally and how personal intention turns into a collective evil. He argues that collective evil stems from a combination of “character, situation, and structure.” Vetlesen poses an important distinction between immorality and evil. While many acts may be considered immoral, only acts that harm another with intentionality are considered acts of evil. He aims to push away what he considers to be the current “shallow” understanding of evil that observes an immoral action's bad effects or consequences by instead focusing on what causes someone to deliberately inflict harm or pain. In the first three chapters, Vetlesen analyzes Bauman's Modernity and the Holocaust, Hannah Arendt's ideas on “the banality of evil” and Adolf Eichmann, and C. Fred Alford's theories on the individual desire to commit evil. He focuses on theories of collective evil by detailing former Yugoslavia's “ethnic cleansing.”
