= C. Fred Alford =

American political scientist and author

- Born: Charles Frederick Alford
- Awards: Lifetime Achievement Award for Outstanding Work in Psychohistory; Three Fulbright Fellowships

Academic work
- Discipline: Moral psychology, psychoanalysis, social theory
- Institutions: University of Maryland, College Park

Charles Frederick Alford is an American political scientist and scholar known for his work in moral psychology, psychoanalysis, and social theory. He is Distinguished Scholar-Teacher Emeritus at the University of Maryland, College Park, where he taught classical political theory for thirty-eight years.

Alford has authored fifteen books, primarily with academic presses such as Yale University Press, Cornell University Press, and Cambridge University Press. His research on the psychological roots of morality and trauma has examined their impact on nations, societies, and groups.

== Early life and education ==
Alford earned his Ph.D. in Government from the University of Texas at Austin in 1979 and his B.A. from Austin College in 1969.

== Career ==
Alford joined the faculty at the University of Maryland, College Park in 1979 and was later named a Distinguished Scholar-Teacher. In 2009, he received the university's Chancellor Kirwan Undergraduate Teacher of the Year Award. He has also received teaching excellence awards from the American Political Science Association and Pi Sigma Alpha.

Alford co-edited the "Psychoanalysis and Society" series with Cornell University Press and served as executive director of the Association for Psychoanalysis, Culture, and Society for twelve years. He was also President of the American Political Science Association's Psychology and Politics section. He has served on the editorial boards of numerous academic journals, including Political Psychology and Psychoanalysis, Culture, and Society. He continues to publish and currently serves as a contributing editor for The Montreal Review.

== Contributions to psychoanalysis and social theory ==
Alford's theoretical approach relies on utilizing non-Freudian psychoanalysis to read and interpret classic texts. He is noted for recognizing the social theory implicit in the work of Melanie Klein, as explored in his book Melanie Klein and Critical Social Theory (Yale, 1989). His work applies the British object relations tradition, particularly the theories of Klein, Wilfred Bion, and D.W. Winnicott, to classical political theory and modern suffering. He has continued applying object relations theory to adult political life throughout his career.

In his 2013 book Trauma and Forgiveness: Consequences and Communities, Alford challenges conventional theories of trauma by analyzing testimonies from Holocaust survivors and victims of everyday trauma. He argues that the traumatized are capable of coherently representing their experiences, and posits that forgiveness is frequently used as a psychological defense to avoid the difficult process of mourning unrecoverable losses. Instead, he conceptualizes forgiveness as a classical virtue grounded in the recognition of human vulnerability.

His research extends to the psychoanalytic dimensions of evil. To study the concept, he conducted interpretive analysis of interview data drawn from 40 free informants, 10 prison staff members, and 18 inmates during an ongoing discussion group. In his book What Evil Means to Us, he argues that the primary experience of evil is existential, an experience of dread and meaningless victimhood rather than a strictly moral one.

Alford expanded his research on evil during a Fulbright Fellowship to South Korea. He investigated the absence of the concept of evil in Eastern cultures. In his 1999 book Think No Evil: Korean Values in the Age of Globalization, Alford states that Asian philosophical traditions reject the dualism of good and evil. He traces this non-dualistic thought to the 5th-century BCE Tao Te Ching. He explains that terms translating to "very bad" serve a comparable linguistic function while avoiding the dualistic implications of the Western concept of evil.

While not a professional theologian, he has written extensively on natural law and religion, curating two blogs, traumatheory.com and godblog.org. The latter formed the basis for his book God Now: Christianity and Heresy, published by Wipf and Stock.

== Whistleblowing research ==
In his 2001 book Whistleblowers: Broken Lives and Organizational Power, Alford examines organizational powers and the reprisals faced by whistleblowers, contrasting with traditional heroic narratives. He describes the ethical framework of whistleblowers through the idea of "narcissism moralised," and details how standing up against organizations frequently results in broken trust and severe trauma. He has discussed the experiences of whistleblowers in over 200 media interviews.

== Awards and honors ==
Alford has received several professional honors throughout his career, including the Lifetime Achievement Award for Outstanding Work in Psychohistory from the Psychohistory Forum. He has been awarded three Fulbright Fellowships, including two Senior Fulbright Research Fellowships to Germany and South Korea.
