= Austro-Serbian alliance of 1881 =

1881 secret bilateral treaty between Austria-Hungary and the Principality of Serbia

Austro-Serbian Alliance
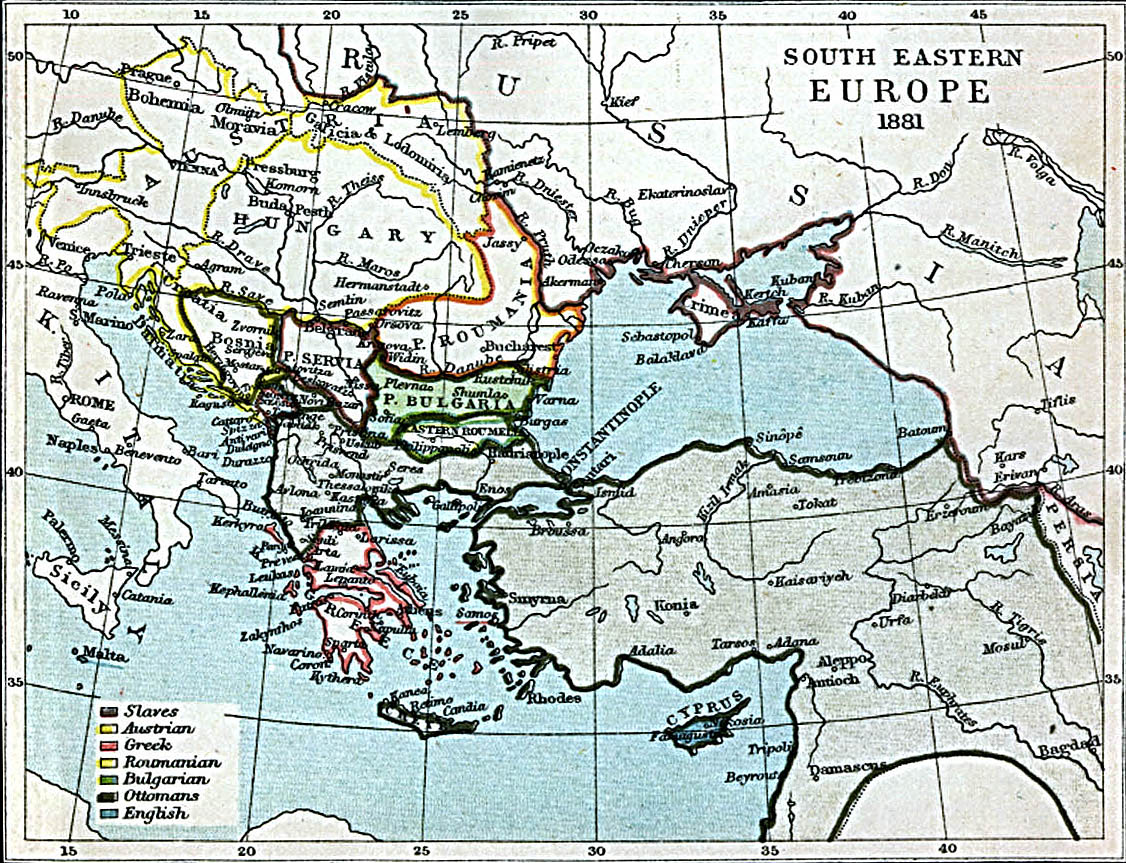
- South-eastern Europe in 1881
- Signed: 28 June 1881
- Location: Belgrade, Serbia
- Parties: Austria-Hungary; Serbia

The Austro-Serbian Convention of 1881 (German: Geheimvertrag zwischen Österreich-Ungarn und Serbien; Hungarian: Osztrák-magyar–szerb titkos egyezmény; Serbian: Аустро-српски савез из 1881) was a secret bilateral treaty that was signed in Belgrade on 28 June 1881 by Gabriel Freiherr Herbert-Rathkeal on behalf of Austria-Hungary and by Čedomilj Mijatović on behalf of the Principality of Serbia. The convention effectively turned Serbia into a protectorate state of Austria-Hungary, which meant its accession by proxy to the subsequent Triple Alliance (1882). Serbia then received Austrian support during the Serbo-Bulgarian War.

The Balkans had been divided into spheres of influence, with Austria taking the western part (including Serbia) and Russia taking the eastern part (including Bulgaria). The treaty came after the railway convention of 6 April 1881 for the construction of the Belgrade–Niš section of the Vienna–Constantinople railway, and the trade treaty of 6 May 1881 which made Austria-Hungary virtually the sole market for agricultural products from Serbia and thereby dominant.

After the Treaty of Berlin (1878), Serbia chose to accept Austria as its patron since Russia had become a protector of Bulgaria. Nevertheless, the conclusion of the convention was met with resentment and opposition from Russophile sections of the political class in Serbia, including opposition on the part of the Prime Minister Milan Piroćanac.

Under the treaty, Austria-Hungary pledged to support the Obrenović dynasty, recognised the Serbian prince as king and acknowledged Serbia's southward territorial claims. In return, Serbia undertook not to allow any agitation or military activity inimical to Austro-Hungarian interests, which notably included those in Bosnia and Herzegovina and Sanjak of Novi Pazar, and all foreign treaties of Serbia were to obtain Vienna's prior approval.

== See also ==
- Ottoman–Bulgarian alliance
- May Coup

== Sources ==
- Ian D. Armour (2014). Apple of Discord: The "Hungarian Factor" in Austro-Serbian Relations, 1867–1881. Purdue University Press. pp. 311–. ISBN 978-1-55753-683-9.
- Alfred Francis Pribram; Austro-Hungarian Monarchy (1920). The Secret Treaties of Austria-Hungary, 1879–1914: Texts of the treaties and agreements, with translations by Denys P. Myers and J.G. D'Arcy Paul. Harvard University Press. pp. 50–52.
- Jan G. Beaver (2009). Collision Course: Franz Conrad Von Hötzendorf, Serbia, and the Politics of Preventive War. Lulu.com. pp. 67–. ISBN 978-0-557-09600-8.
- Robin Okey; Senior Lecturer in History Robin Okey (2003). Eastern Europe 1740–1985: Feudalism to Communism. Routledge. pp. 134–. ISBN 978-1-134-88687-6.
- Enciklopedija Jugoslavije (1968). Enciklopedija Jugoslavije, Vol. 7 // Sovjetsko-jugoslovenski odnosi (in Serbo-Croatian). Zagreb, Socialist Federal Republic of Yugoslavia: Jugoslovenski leksikografski zavod.
