= Kosovo field =

Plain in eastern Kosovo

Coordinates: 42°43′03″N 21°05′06″E

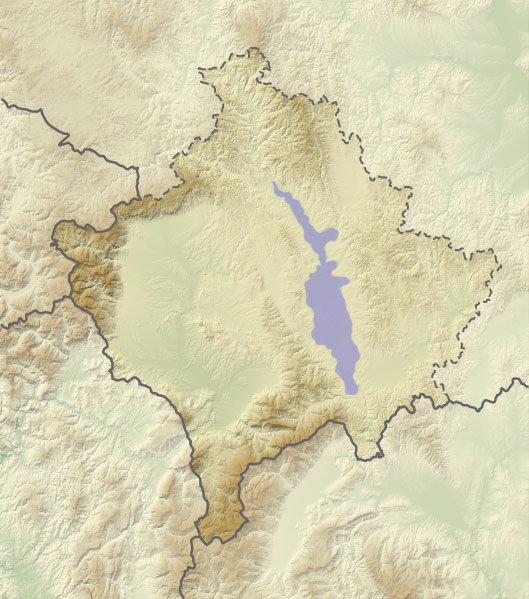
Approximate extent of the Kosovo field plain

Kosovo field (Albanian: Fusha e Kosovës; Serbian: Косово поље, romanized: Kosovo polje, lit. 'Blackbird Field') is a large karst field, located in the middle part of Kosovo. It is mostly known for being the site of the Battle of Kosovo (1389) between the Balkan Alliance led by Lazar of Serbia and Ottoman armies led by Murad I, and many other battles.

== Geography ==
The large karst field is directed northwest–south. The plain stretches from Mitrovica southwards including Obiliq, Kosovo Polje (which lies in the centre), Lipjan, and almost to Kaçanik. The region of Kosovo stretches roughly from Ferizaj to Vushtrri.

It is situated 500–600 m above sea level.

In the central part, to the west, is the Drenica valley.

== History ==
=== Medieval ===
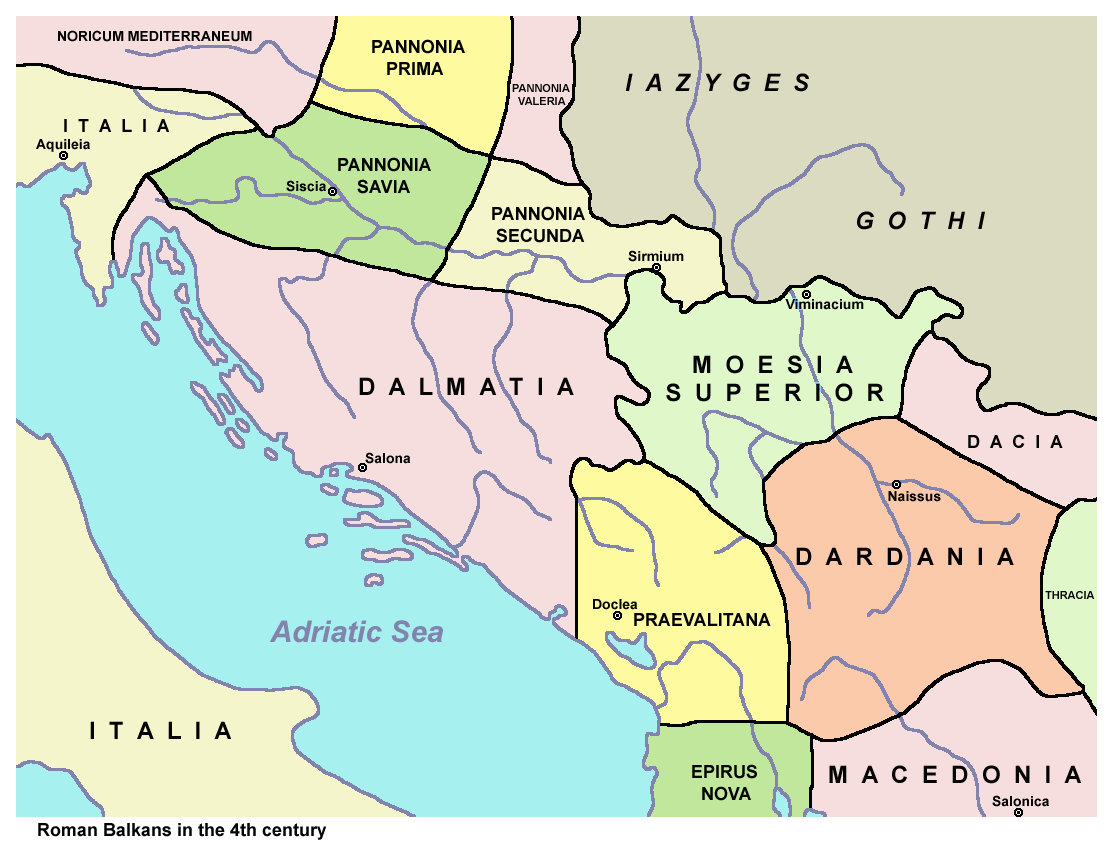
The field of Kosovo was in the Roman province of Dardania

The region was an economic hub of the early Eastern Roman Empire in the province of Dardania. Praevalitana (the region before the valley), a province that bordered Dardania was named after the fact that it was located directly to the west of the field. A reference to the field may appear in the early Christian cult of Florus and Laurus of the fourth century AD, which was recorded no earlier than the sixth century AD. In the recorded version in Constantinople, the geographical location of Ulpiana, which was a settlement in the field of Kosovo, is described in Greek as Eucharis Koilas (the Gracious Valley).

Disposition of troops on the Kosovo Field during the Battle of Kosovo

The Kosovo field was the site of the Battle of Kosovo in June 1389, the battlefield northwest of Pristina where an army led by Prince Lazar of Serbia fought the Ottoman army. It is for this field, and the battle, that the Kosovo region and contemporary Kosovo, and in turn the historical Kosovo Vilayet and Yugoslav Kosovo and Metohija is named. The modern city of Kosovo Polje is also named after the field.

Serbian ruler Stefan Lazarević (1389–1427) erected a marble column with inscriptions on the field, in memory of his father.

The Second Battle of Kosovo was fought between the Ottoman Empire and Kingdom of Hungary in 1448.

The Ottoman cadastral tax census (defter) of 1455 in the District of Branković took place in the Kosovo field which is in a part of eastern Kosovo.

=== Modern history ===
In 1877, the Kosovo Vilayet was established by the Ottoman Empire a first-level administrative division. This area included the majority of the modern Kosovo.

In 1912–13, the Kingdom of Serbia conquered the Vilayet.

During World War I, the army of the Kingdom of Serbia retreated to the Kosovo plain by November 1915. Then, under attack from both sides, the army withdrew across the mountains into Albania.

The Kingdom of Yugoslavia (1918–1941) controlled Kosovo Field and its residents.

Animated series of maps showing the breakup of the SFR Yugoslavia from 1989 through 2008. The colors represent the different areas of control.

Kosovo and Vojvodina, another formerly autonomous region of Serbia, had practically comparable status with the other six Yugoslav republics according to constitutional revisions made in 1971. The provinces were granted the opportunity to create their own constitutions and were granted equal status under a new Yugoslav constitution that was adopted in 1974.

When Slobodan Milošević came to power in 1989, the provinces' autonomy was removed and Belgrade gained political control. Thus, the Socialist Federal Republic of Yugoslavia (ended 1992) and the Federal Republic of Yugoslavia (its successor in the Breakup of Yugoslavia) managed Kosovo up until the Kosovo War in 1998–1999, at the conclusion of which the forces of Milošević left the field and the region was overseen by the UN with the installation of an interim government.

During the war, the Kosovo Liberation Army and FR Yugoslavia forces actively battled around the region, especially the parts in which many Albanians resided.

In the 21st century, plans have been made to establish multiple coal mines around the Kosovo field.

== See also ==
- Llap (region)
