= List of ambassadors of Austria to Turkey =

Ambassador of the Republic of Austria to the Republic of Turkey
- Coat of arms of Austria

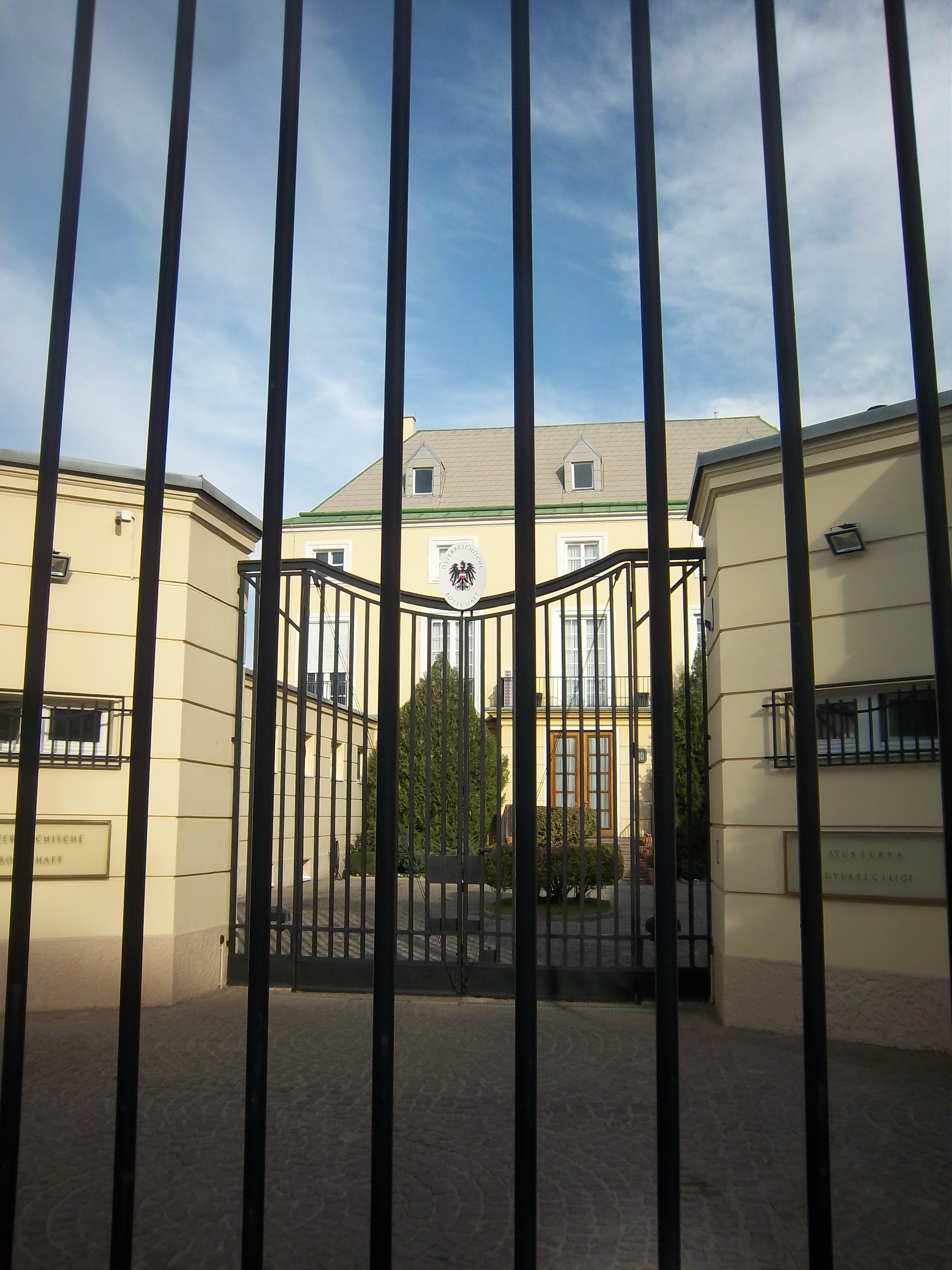
- Incumbent; Gabriele Juen since 23 January 2024
- Ministry of Foreign Affairs; Embassy of Austria in Ankara
- Style: Her Excellency
- Reports to: Minister of Foreign Affairs
- Seat: Ankara
- Appointer: President of Austria
- Term length: At the discretion of the President
- Website: Embassy of Austria in Turkey

The Ambassador of Austria to Turkey is an officer of the Federal Ministry for European and International Affairs of Austria and the head of the Embassy of the Republic of Austria to the Republic of Turkey. The ambassador and her staff resides in Ankara.

There are honorary consuls in Antakya, Antalya, Bodrum, Bursa, Edirne, Gaziantep, İzmir, and Mersin, as well as a consulate general in Istanbul.

The post of Austrian Ambassador to Turkey is currently held by Gabriele Juen, incumbent since 23 January 2024.

== History ==
Diplomatic relations between Austria and Turkey date back to the late 15th century, marked by initial encounters between the Habsburg Monarchy and the Ottoman Empire. Starting in 1547, Habsburg emperors intermittently dispatched ambassadors to Constantinople. By the 18th century, the number of Habsburg consulates in the Ottoman Empire had grown to 101, with 19 located in present-day Turkey.Empress Maria Theresa's establishment of the Oriental Languages Academy in 1754 underscored the significance of relations with the Ottomans, training diplomats in languages including Ottoman Turkish. A notable graduate, Joseph von Hammer-Purgstall, authored a seminal ten-volume history of the Ottoman Empire.

In the 19th century, diplomatic, economic, scientific, and cultural relations between the two empires intensified. Austrian Lloyd emerged as a major shipping company in the Eastern Mediterranean and Black Sea regions. The Austrian St. George's Hospital and College were established in Istanbul in 1872 and 1882, respectively, and archaeological excavations at Ephesus commenced in 1895. Following World War I and the subsequent dissolution of both empires, diplomatic relations were reestablished. In 1924, Austria and Turkey signed a friendship treaty, formalizing their diplomatic engagement. Austrian architects, notably Clemens Holzmeister, played a significant role in the development of modern Ankara, designing key buildings such as the Parliament Building and various ministries. Since 1964, bilateral agreements have facilitated the employment of thousands of Turkish workers by Austrian companies. Today, approximately 270,000 people of Turkish descent reside in Austria, contributing to cultural dialogue and bilateral relations.

== List of representatives ==
=== Representatives of the Habsburg Monarchy to the Ottoman Empire ===
Appointment	Name	Remarks	Appointed by	Accredited to	Left the post
1510	Frederico di Strassoldo	envoy	Maximilian I	Selim I	1511
1530	Benedikt Kuripečič	envoy	Ferdinand I	Suleyman I	
1554	Ogier Ghislain de Busbecq	Envoy and ambassador	Ferdinand I	Suleyman I	1562
1572	David Ungnad	Messenger and Ambassador	Maximilian II	Selim II	1578
1578	Johann Joachim von Sinzendorf	Envoy,	Rudolf II	Murad III	
1608	Adam Freiherr zu Herberstein	envoy		Ahmed I	1609
1616	Hermann Czernin von Chudenitz	envoy	Matthias		1618
1700	Philipp Ludwig Wenzel von Sinzendorf	Ambassador	Leopold I	Mustafa II	1701
1701	Leopold Mamuca della Torre		Leopold I	Mustafa II	1703
1703	Leopold von Talmann		Joseph I	Ahmed III	1711
1711	Anselm Franz von Fleischmann	Internuncio - Minister Plenipotentiary	Charles VI	Ahmed III	1716
12 January 1719	Damian Hugo, Count of Virmont		Charles VI	Ahmed III	27 March 1720
28 March 1720	Josef von Dirling		Charles VI	Ahmed III	14 July 1728
14 July 1728	Ludwig von Talmann		Charles VI	Ahmed III	18 July 1737
18. July 1737 to August 11, 1740: interruption of relations
11 August 1740	Anton Corfiz Ulfeldt	(* 1699; † 1760) Grand Ambassador	Maria Theresa	Mahmud I	20 October 1740
25 October 1740	Anton Corfiz Ulfeldt	Ambassador	Maria Theresa	Mahmud I	4 May 1741
4 May 1741	Heinrich von Penckler		Maria Theresa	Mahmud I	31 January 1754
1 April 1754	Josef von Schwachheim		Maria Theresa	Osman III	16 January 1762
16 January 1762	Heinrich von Penckler		Maria Theresa	Mustafa III	5 June 1766
5 June 1766	Franz Anton Brognard		Maria Theresa	Mustafa III	22 June 1769
1766	Josef von Heinrich	envoy	Maria Theresia	Mustafa III	
18 September 1769	Johann Amadeus von Thugut	(* 1736 in Linz, † 1818 in Vienna)	Maria Theresa	Mustafa III	27 August 1776
1769	Emanuel of Tassara	Envoy, business manager	Maria Theresa	Mustafa III	
10 July 1779	Peter Philipp von Herbert-Rathkeal	(* 1735 in Constantinople)	Joseph II	Abdulhamid I	9 February 1788
9 February 1788 to September 16, 1791: Relationships broken as a result of the Austro-Turkish War (1788–1791)
16 September 1791	Bartholomew of Testa	Envoy	Leopold II	Selim III	
20 February 1792	Peter Philipp von Herbert-Rathkeal		Leopold II	Selim III	20 February 1802
1792	Bartholomäus von Testa	Envoy	Leopold II	Selim III	
28 June 1802	Ignaz Lorenz von Stürmer		Franz II	Selim III	10 March 1818
8 April 1818	Rudolf von Lützow	(1780-1858),	Franz II	Mahmud II	31 July 1822
31 July 1822	Franz von Ottenfels-Gschwind	(1778-1851)	Franz II	Mahmud II	2 October 1832
2 October 1832	Bartholomäus von Stürmer		Franz II	Mahmud II	24 April 1850
1832	Eduard von Klezl	(1805-1874), Envoy	Franz II	Mahmud II	
27 March 1853	Karl Ludwig von Bruck		Franz Joseph I.	Abdülmecid I	21 January 1855
22 February 1855	August von Koller	(1805-1883)	Franz Joseph I.	Abdülmecid I	12 October 1855
12 October 1855	Anton von Prokesch-Osten	Envoy, From 27 July 1867 Ambassador	Franz Joseph I.	Abdülmecid I	3 November 1871
10 January 1872	Emanuel von Ludolf	(1823 in Linz - 1898 in Vercelli, Piemont)	Franz Joseph I.	Abdülaziz	15 March 1874
11 March 1874	Franz Zichy zu Zich und von Vásonykeö	Ambassador	Franz Joseph I.	Abdülaziz	26 November 1879
15 July 1880	Heinrich von Calice	(* 1831; † 1912) Ambassador	Franz Joseph I.	Abdul Hamid II	22 September 1906
5 October 1906	Johann von Pallavicini	Ambassador	Franz Joseph I.	Abdul Hamid II	11 November 1918

=== Representatives of the Republic of Austria to the Republic of Turkey ===
Appointment	Name	Remarks	Appointed by	Accredited to	Left the post
20 November 1924	August Kral		Michael Hainisch	Mustafa Kemal Atatürk	April 1932
17 October 1933	Karl Buchberger	^{A}	Wilhelm Miklas	Mustafa Kemal Atatürk	1938
12 March 1938 to 27 November 1946: Diplomatic relations were disrupted due to the Anschluss, during which Austria ceased to exist as an independent nation until the end of World War II.
27 November 1946	Clemens Wildner		Karl Renner	İsmet İnönü	1951
6 March 1952	Erich Bielka		Theodor Körner	Celâl Bayar	1958
5 May 1958	Karl Hartl		Adolf Schärf	Celâl Bayar	1963
5 December 1963	Olivier Resseguier		Adolf Schärf	Cemal Gürsel	1964
26 November 1965	Wolfgang Jungwirth		Franz Jonas	Cemal Gürsel	1968
21 November 1968	Franz Herbatschek		Franz Jonas	Cevdet Sunay	1975
1976	Heinz Laube		Rudolf Kirchschläger	Fahri Korutürk	1978
1979	Franz Wunderbaldinger		Rudolf Kirchschläger	Fahri Korutürk	1982
1983	Klaus Ziegler		Rudolf Kirchschläger	Kenan Evren	1988
1988	Friedrich Zanetti		Kurt Waldheim	Kenan Evren	1992
1993	Johann Plattner		Thomas Klestil	Turgut Özal	1997
6 February 1998	Ralph Scheide		Thomas Klestil	Süleyman Demirel	2001
21 December 2001	Marius Calligaris		Thomas Klestil	Ahmet Necdet Sezer	2006
3 August 2006	Heidemaria Gürer		Heinz Fischer	Ahmet Necdet Sezer	2011
18 January 2012	Klaus Wölfer		Heinz Fischer	Abdullah Gül	2017
11 September 2017	Ulrike Tilly		Alexander Van der Bellen	Recep Tayyip Erdoğan	2019
24 October 2019	Johannes Wimmer		Alexander Van der Bellen	Recep Tayyip Erdoğan	2023
23 January 2024	Gabriele Juen		Alexander Van der Bellen	Recep Tayyip Erdoğan	

=== Notes ===
^A Also served as Ambassador of Austria to Persia and Iraq (1933-1938).

== See also ==
- Austria-Turkey relations
- List of ambassadors of Turkey to Austria
- Ottoman-Habsburg Wars
- Palace of Venice, Istanbul
