= Miloš Obilić =

Legendary Serbian knight

Saint Miloš Obilić Милош Обилић
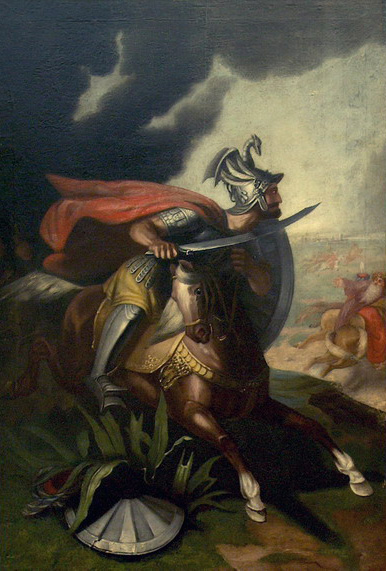
- Painting by Aleksandar Dobrić, 1861
- Born: Unknown
- Died: 28 June 1389 (15 June O.S.); Kosovo field, District of Branković
- Venerated in: 1800-1900
- Feast: 28 June

Miloš Obilić (Serbian Cyrillic: Милош Обилић, pronounced [mîloʃ ôbilit͡ɕ]) is a legendary Serbian knight and saint in the Serbian Orthodox Church traditionally said to have served Prince Lazar during the Ottoman invasion of Serbia in the late 14th century. Although absent from contemporary records, he features prominently in later accounts of the 1389 Battle of Kosovo as the assassin of Sultan Murad I. The assassin remains unnamed in historical sources until the late 15th century, but the widespread circulation of the story in Florentine, Serbian, Ottoman, and Greek sources suggests that versions of it were known across the Balkans within decades of the battle.

His original name is believed to have been Miloš Kobilić, though multiple variations exist in historical sources, and his actual existence remains uncertain. The Lazar dynasty, consolidating its power, gave birth to the Kosovo Myth, which incorporated the legend of Obilić. Jelka Ređep notes that Obilić's legend significantly evolved through oral tradition, reflecting Serbian cultural ideals of heroism, loyalty and sacrifice. Over time, he became a central figure in Serbian epic poetry, where he was elevated to the status of a national hero embodying medieval Serbian folklore. Alongside Prince Lazar’s martyrdom and the alleged treachery of Vuk Branković, Miloš's deed became integral to Serbian narratives surrounding the Battle of Kosovo. By the 19th century, he was also venerated as a saint in the Serbian Orthodox Church.

Miloš Obilić also appears in Albanian epic poetry, where he is remembered as Millosh Kopiliqi, with his birthplace traditionally linked to the Drenica region in modern-day Kosovo, where villages named Kopiliq still exist. However, there is no definitive evidence confirming the identity of Murad’s assassin.

== Name ==
Miloš is a Slavic given name recorded from the early Middle Ages among the Bulgarians, Czechs, Poles and Serbs. It is derived from the Slavic root mil-, meaning "merciful" or "dear", which is found in a great number of Slavic given names.

Several versions of the hero's surname have been used throughout history. His original surname was Kobilić or Kobilović, a thesis which is further supported by archival findings by historian Mihailo Dinić in Ragusan archives of 1433 which show that Miloš's original surname was indeed Kobilić (Latin: Cobilich). In Albanian folklore, the original name is preserved and he is known as Kopiliq. The root of the name 'Kopiliq' might be in an old Balkan substrat word, in Albanian kopil (child or bastard child), in Romanian copil (child) and in Serbian kopile (bastard child) or kobila (mare, from which kobilić, son of the mare). The etymological origin of his name is indicated in Serbian folk stories which claim that the hero is said to have been nursed by a mare. Jireček connected the surname to two noble families in medieval Ragusa and Trebinje, the Kobilić and Kobiljačić in the 14th and 15th centuries, and noted that they altered their surnames in the 18th century because they considered it "indecent" to be associated with mares. A poem by Croat Andrija Kačić Miošić titled Pisma od Miloscia Cobilichja i Vuka Brancovichja (Pisma od Kobilića i Vuka Brankovića, modern spelling) preserves the old name in the 18th century.

The rendering Obilić has universally been used by Serbian writers in modern times. Its first version is found in the History of Montenegro (1754) by Vasilije Petrović, who wrote of one Miloš Obilijević, and in 1765, the historian Pavle Julinac who rendered the surname as Obilić. According to Czech historian Konstantin Jireček, the surname Obilić and its different renderings are derived from the Serbian words obilan ("plenty of") and obilje ("wealth, abundance").

Miloš is often referred to in the epic poems as "Miloš of Pocerje", and according to local legends, he came from the western Serbian region of Pocerina. In Pocerina there is a spring known as "Miloševa Banja" (Miloš's spring) and an old grave that is claimed to be the grave of Miloš's sister.

== Literary sources ==
The earliest sources on the Battle of Kosovo, which generally favour the cult of Prince Lazar, do not mention Miloš or his assassination of the sultan. The assassination itself is first recorded by Deacon Ignjatije on 9 July 1389, only 12 days after the battle. The assassination of sultan Murad and one of his sons (Yakub Çelebi) was also mentioned in the instructions of the Venetian Senate issued to Andrea Bembo on 23 July 1389, although Venetians were uncertain if news about the assassination were true. On 1 August 1389 King Tvrtko I of Bosnia (r. 1353–1391) wrote a letter to Trogir to inform its citizens about the Ottoman defeat. Victory over the Turks (Latin: ob victoriam de Turcis) was also reported by Coluccio Salutati (died 1406), Chancellor of Florence, in his letter to King Tvrtko, dated 20 October 1389, on behalf of the Florentine Senate. The killer is not named but he is described as one of twelve Christian noblemen who managed to break through the Ottoman ranks:

"Fortunate, most fortunate are those hands of the twelve loyal lords who, having opened their way with the sword and having penetrated the enemy lines and the circle of chained camels, heroically reached the tent of Amurat [Murad] himself. Fortunate above all is that one who so forcefully killed such a strong vojvoda by stabbing him with a sword in the throat and belly. And blessed are all those who gave their lives and blood through the glorious manner of martyrdom as victims of the dead leader over his ugly corpse."

Scholars consider many details in Tvrtko's letter to be fanciful, including the symbolic number 12.

In 1402, an anonymous Catalan author assigned Murad's death to a Hungarian knight. The knight might have been related to Lazar through marriage and had sent a Hungarian contingent to the battle. In the legend, Miloš Obilić was Lazar's son-in-law; in reality, Lazar had a Hungarian son-in-law. Another Italian account, Mignanelli's 1416 work, asserted that it was Lazar who killed the Ottoman sultan.

The assassin's first appearance in Serbian sources is in the biography of Stefan Lazarević, Lazar's son, by Constantine the Philosopher, written in the 1440s. The hero, still anonymous, is described as a man of noble birth whom envious tongues had sought to defame before the prince. To prove his loyalty and courage, he left the front line on the pretext of being a deserter, seized the opportunity to stab the sultan to death and was killed himself shortly afterwards. The initial phase of ignominy and its redemption by a courageous plot of slaying the sultan are narrative ingredients which would become essential to the Serbian legend as it evolved in later times.

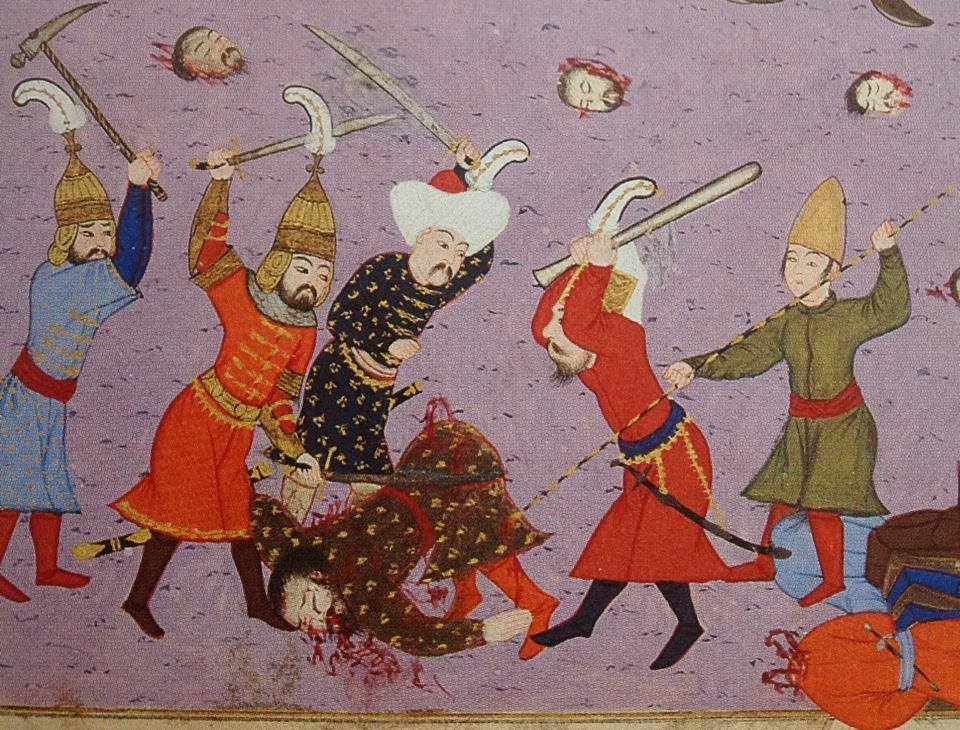
Slaying of Miloš Obilić by Nakkaş Osman

The loss of the Sultan also made an impression on the earliest Ottoman sources. They usually describe how Murad was unaccompanied on the battlefield and an anonymous Christian who had been lying among the corpses stabbed him to death. In the early 15th century, for instance, the poet Ahmedi writes that "[s]uddenly one of the Christians, who was covered in blood and apparently hidden among the enemy dead, got up, rushed to Murad and stabbed him with a dagger."

Halil İnalcık explained that one of the most important contemporary Ottomans sources about the Battle of Kosovo is the 1465 work of Enveri (Turkish: Düstûrnâme). İnalcık argued that it was based on the testimony of a contemporary eyewitness of the battle, probably Hoca Omer, an envoy sent by the Sultan to Lazar before the battle. In this work Enveri explains that before he became a Serbian nobleman, Miloš (Miloš Ban is how İnalcık rendered the name in Enveri's text) was a Muslim at the Sultan's court who deserted Ottomans and abjured Islam. The Sultan allegedly called him to return to his service many times. Enveri explains that although Miloš always promised to return, he never did. According to this account, when Lazar was captured, Miloš approached the Sultan who was riding a black stallion and said: "I am Miloš Ban, I want to go back to my Islamic faith and kiss your hand." When Miloš came close to the Sultan, he struck him with the dagger hidden in his cuff. The Sultan's men cut Miloš into pieces with swords and axes.

One historian from Edirne, Oruc Bey, explains the lack of protection by saying that the army was preoccupied with pursuing the enemy in rear flight and introduces an element of deception: the Christian "had promised himself as a sacrifice and approached Murad, who was sitting alone on his horse. Pretending he wished to kiss the Sultan's hand, he stabbed the Sultan with a sharp dagger."

Since about the late 15th century, Greek sources also begin to record the event. The Athenian scholar Laonicus Chalcocondyles (d. c. 1490) claims to draw on Greek traditions when he refers to Murad's killer as Miloes, "a man of noble birth [... who] voluntarily decided to accomplish the heroic act of assassination. He requested what he needed from Prince Lazar, and then rode off to Murad's camp with the intention of presenting himself as a deserter. Murad, who was standing in the midst of his troops before the battle, was eager to receive the deserter. Miloes reached the Sultan and his bodyguards, turned his spear against Murad, and killed him." Writing in the second half of the same century, Michael Doukas regarded the story as worthy of inclusion in his Historia Byzantina. He relates how the young nobleman pretended to desert the battle, was captured by the Turks and professing to know the key to victory, managed to gain access to Murad and kill him.

In 1976, Miodrag Popović suggested that the narrative elements of secrecy and stratagem in the Serbian tradition were all introduced from Turkish sources, seeking to defame the capabilities of their Christian opponents by attributing the death of the Murat to "devious" methods. Thomas A. Emmert agrees with him.

Emmert says that Turkish sources mentioned the assassination several times, while Western and Serbian sources didn't mention it until much later. He thinks that Serbians knew about the assassination, but decided not to mention it in their first accounts for unknown reasons.

In 1512, Ottoman historian Mehmed Nesri wrote a detailed account of the battle that became the source for later Ottoman and Western descriptions of the battle. Nesri's account took several elements from popular Serbian tradition, and described the assassination in a way which reflected negatively on the perpetrators.

There is no evidence about the knight's origin; theories that the legend was based on a Serb, Albanian or Hungarian knight have been put forward.

== Oral traditions ==
=== Serbian traditions ===
Miloš Obilić is a major hero of the Serbian legend of Kosovo, whose central part is the Battle of Kosovo. According to the legend, Miloš was married with the princess Jelena, daughter of the Serbian Prince Lazar. A quarrel broke out between his wife and her sister who was married to Vuk Branković, about superiority in valour of their respective husbands. As a consequence of this, Branković took offence and picked a fight with Miloš. Filled with hate, Branković maligned Miloš to Lazar, saying that he conspired with Turks to betray the prince. At Lazar's supper on the eve of the battle, the prince reproached Miloš for disloyalty. To prove his loyalty, Miloš went into the Turkish camp feigning defection. At a favourable moment, he stabbed and killed the Turkish Sultan Murad, whose attendants then executed Miloš. The legend then goes on to describe events regarding the battle.

There are two main views about the creation of the Kosovo legend. In one view, its place of origin lies in the region in which the Battle of Kosovo was fought. In the other view, the legend sprang up in more westerly Balkan regions under the influence of the French chansons de geste. Serbian philologist Dragutin Kostić stated that the French chivalric epics had in fact no part in the formation of the legend, but that they "only modified the already created and formed legend and its first poetic manifestations". The nucleus from which the legend developed is found in the cultic literature celebrating Prince Lazar as a martyr and saint, written in Moravian Serbia between 1389 and 1420. Especially important in this regard is the Discourse on Prince Lazar composed by Serbian Patriarch Danilo III. The legend would gradually evolve during the subsequent centuries.

The tale of the maligned hero who penetrated the Turkish camp and killed Sultan Murad, is found in the Life of Despot Stefan Lazarević written in the 1430s by Konstantin the Philosopher. The hero's name is not mentioned in this work. The theme of the quarrel between Lazar's sons-in-law was first recorded in Herzegovina in the mid-15th century. Lazar's supper on the eve of the battle and his reproach of Miloš are mentioned in texts from the 16th century. The argument between Lazar's daughters over the valor of their husbands was first recorded by Mavro Orbin in 1601. The fully developed legend of Kosovo, with all of its elements, is recorded in the Tale of the Battle of Kosovo composed around the beginning of the 18th century in the Bay of Kotor or Old Montenegro. This was a very popular text, whose copies were continuously produced for some 150 years in an area stretching from the south of ex-Yugoslavia to Budapest and Sofia. The Tale played a notable role in the awakening of national consciousness of the Serbs in the Habsburg monarchy, which began in the first half of the 18th century.

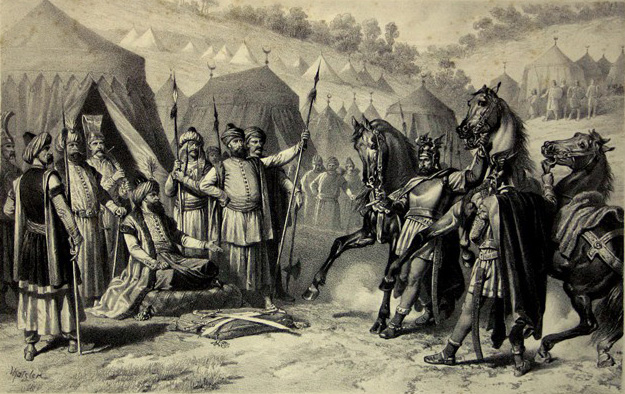
Miloš Obilić at the tent of Sultan Murad.

The first author to refer to Murad's killer by his full name is Konstantin Mihailović, a Serbian Janissary from the village of Ostrovica, near Rudnik, who wrote his Memoirs of a Janissary or Turkish Chronicle in ca 1497. In a passage intended to infer a moral lesson about disloyalty from the Serbian defeat at Kosovo, Mihailović identifies Miloš Kobila as the knight who on the fateful last Friday of the battle slew Murad. The next time a name is given in the sources is three decades later, in 1530, when the (Slovene) monk Benedikt Kuripečič (Curipeschitz) wrote memoirs of his travels through the Balkan Peninsula. His visit to Murad's tomb in Kosovo Polje provides the occasion for the story of the knight whom he names Miloš Kobilović. Kuripešić elaborates on the humiliation and fall from favour which Miloš endured before the battle, his last dinner with Lazar and his nobles, his admittance to Murad's tent, the brutal murder and his own death on attempting to escape on horseback. The monk, though not explicit about his sources, writes that Miloš was a celebrated figure in the popular traditions of Serbs, who sing about his heroic exploits on the border. He recorded some legends about the Battle of Kosovo and mentions epic songs about Obilić in regions far from Kosovo, like Bosnia and Croatia. In his 1603 work Richard Knolles described the "country songs" of Serbs about the Battle of Kosovo and referred to Obilić as "Cobelitz".

In the poem "Obilić Dragon's Son", Miloš is given a mythical ancestry as the son of a dragon to emphasise his superhuman strength on a physical and spiritual level; in this, he joins the ranks of many other heroes of Serbian poetry who fought against Turkish oppression and are claimed to have been descendants of a dragon. Jelka Ređep, a scholar of Serbian folklore and epic poetry, argues that Miloš Obilić’s story developed significantly through oral transmission, shaping him into a symbolic embodiment of Serbian cultural identity and heroic ideals.

=== Albanian traditions ===
In Albanian epic poetry, the hero is known as Millosh Kopiliqi, a version of the which corresponds to the original name attested in Slavic. He is thought to have been born in the village of Kopiliq in the Drenica region of Kosovo. In Albanian epic poetry, Prince Lazar is not existent in most variants. Instead Milosh Kopiliq, presented as a Christian Albanian warrior, is the sole killer of Sultan Murat. In the story, after Murat's death he is betrayed by an old Slavic woman (shkina in the original) and then is decapitated by the Ottomans. Gligorije Elezović recorded the Albanian version in the 1920s in Kosovo as sung by folk singers. Albert Lord, an expert in Balkan epic poetry, considered the tale of Milos Kobilić as a "mainly Albanian folk expression which traced its major elements to Albanian oral traditions". By comparing the Slavic and Albanian traditions about Kobilić, Lord came to the conclusion that they developed independently, but also borrowed from each other. Lord considers this cultural meeting point to have happened in Sandžak, where Albanians and Slavs lived as neighbours.

== Legacy ==
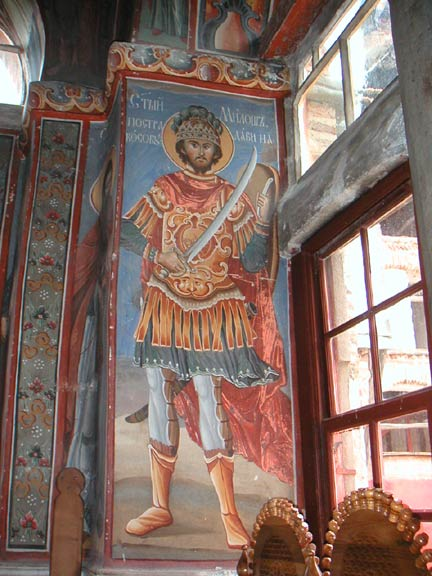
Fresco of Miloš Obilić in Hilandar, depicted as a holy warrior.

The artistically valuable basin by the Šibenik-based goldsmith and engraver Horacije Fortezza (c. 1530–1596) depicts three scenes from the life of the then-already legendary Christian hero, the Serb Miloš Obilić.

It was not until the early 19th century that Miloš was also venerated as a saint in the Serbian Church. During the Serbian Revolution (1804–1815), a fresco of Miloš as a haloed, sword-bearing saint was painted in Prince Lazar's narthex in the Hilandar Monastery on Mount Athos (Greece). The historian Rade Mihaljčić suggests that the cult was a popular movement which originated among the Serbs south of the Sava and Danube during the Ottoman period.

Later in the same century, the heroic figure of Miloš was given a national boost in the epic poem The Mountain Wreath (1847) by Petar II Petrović-Njegoš, prince-bishop of Montenegro. The poem praises the assassin's valour in battle, calling him "the victim of a noble feeling, / An all powerful military genius, / A dreadful thunder that smashes crowns". Njegoš also instituted the Obilić medal for courage.

This event and the Battle of Kosovo itself has become embedded in the Serbs' national consciousness, history, and poetry. Njegoš's tales, including Miloš, inspired later generations of Serbs – notably Gavrilo Princip, the assassin of Archduke Franz Ferdinand.

In 1913, the Medal of Miloš Obilić was awarded by King Peter I to soldiers for the acts of great personal courage, or for personal courage demonstrated on the battlefield. It was given during the Balkan Wars, World War I, and during World War II, to members of the Yugoslav Army or allied forces and was discontinued with the end of the war.

In the late 1980s, religious nationalists began to breathe further life into the figure of Miloš and the Kosovo Myth. Special inspiration was taken from Njegoš's The Mountain Wreath, with its portrayal of Lazar as a Christ-like martyr and Obilić as the Serb sacrificing himself to prove his loyalty and seek retribution. A key event which gave expression to this idea was the 600th anniversary of the Battle of Kosovo (Vidovdan) on 28 June 1989, which was held at the Gazimestan plain, near the site of the battle. Obilić's feat has been cited as a source of inspiration in public speeches by political leaders, notably President Milošević, who referred to him in his Gazimestan speech on the occasion of the battle anniversary. His regime often alluded to Obilić frequently in comparison to Milosević, who was proclaimed the "saviour of the nation".

Obilić is featured in Serbian rhymical idiom "Dva loša ubiše Miloša" or "Dva su loša ubila Miloša" which translates as "Two no-goods have killed Miloš". The idiom addresses the issue of quantity prevailing over quality as a sad fact of life, since Obilić was outnumbered by the enemies.

In Serbian epic poetry, there are several blood brotherhoods. Miloš Obilić with Milan Toplica and Ivan Kosančić, Miloš Obilić with Prince Marko, Miloš Obilić with the Jugović brothers.

He is included in The 100 most prominent Serbs.

== See also ==
- Blagoje Jovović, alleged assassin of Croatian dictator Ante Pavelić
- List of Serbs
- History of Serbia

== Annotations ==
1. The Serbian knight that killed Murad was unnamed until the 15th century; Athenian scholar Laonicus Chalcondyles (d. ca. 1490), claiming to draw on Greek traditions, refers to Murad's killer as Miloes or Milion. In the work of Aşıkpaşazade (d. 1484), he is named (in Serbian transliteration) Biliš Kobila. In the work of Serbian janissary Konstantin Mihailović (1435–1501) written in ca. 1497, his name is written as Miloš Kobila. In the work of Ottoman chronicler Mehmed Neşrî (d. ca. 1520), his name is rendered Miloš Kobila or Miloš Kobilović. In Slovene monk Benedikt Kuripešić's Balkan travel memoirs dating to 1530, he uses Miloš Kobilović. The Italian edition of Doukas chronicles (15th century) renders the name Miloš Kobilić. Mavro Orbini (1601) renders the name Miloš Kobilić. Ludovik Crijević Tuberon (1459–1527), in his Writings on the Present Age (published in 1603), Milon is used.
  In a manuscript written by Mihailo Miloradović dating to 1714–15, the form "Obilić" is used. In a manuscript (УБ) dating to 1715–25, the form "Kobilić" is used. In a manuscript (Г) dating to 1727, the form "Obilić" is used. In the Podgorica chronicle (1738), "Omiljević" is used. In a manuscript written by Mihailo Jeličić dating to 1745, the form "Kobilić" is used. In a manuscript written by Ilija Jovanov dating to 1750, both "Kobilić" and "Obilić" are used. In Vasilije Petrović's work History of Montenegro dating to 1754, "Obiljević" or "Obilijević" were used. Serbian historian Pavle Julinac used "Obilić" in 1763. In a Ravanica manuscript dating to 1764, the form "Hobilić" (Хобилић) is used. Based on these studied manuscripts, the younger form Obilić is first attested in the beginning of the 18th century and possibly the end of the 17th century. This refutes Dragutin Kostić's view that the form Obilić is from the mid-18th century.
2. Several manuscripts of Mihailović's chronicle have been preserved, most of which use the form "Kobila" or "Kobyla", while the first printing in Czech, dating from 1565, uses the form "Kobiza".

== Sources ==
- Emmert, Thomas A. (1996), "Milos Obilic and the Hero Myth" (PDF), Journal of the North American Society for Serbian Studies, 10: 149–163, archived from the original (PDF) on 10 August 2017
- Emmert, Thomas A. (1991), Wayne S. Vucinich and Thomas A. Emmert (ed.), "The Battle of Kosovo: Early Reports of Victory and Defeat", Kosovo: Legacy of a Medieval Battle, Minnesota Mediterranean and East European Monographs 1, archived from the original on 5 June 2011 Reproduced online at De Re Militari. The Society for Medieval Military History.
- Di Lellio, Anna (2013). "The field of the blackbirds and the battle for Europe". In Langenbacher, Eric; Niven, Bill; Wittlinger, Ruth (eds.). Dynamics of Memory and Identity in Contemporary Europe. Berghahn Books. pp. 149–165. ISBN 978-0-85745-577-2.
- Gavrilović, Danijela (2003), "Elements of the Ethnic Identification of the Serbs", Facta Universitatis, 2 (10): 717–730
- Judah, Tim (2000), Kosovo: War and Revenge (2nd ed.), New Haven: Yale University Press
- Sells, Michael Anthony (1996), The Bridge Betrayed. Religion and Genocide in Bosnia, University of California Press
- Stevanovic, Vidosav (1 October 2004), Milosevic: The People's Tyrant, I.B.Tauris, ISBN 9781860648427
- İnalcık, Halil (2000). Kosovo: six siècles de mémoires croisées. Institut national des langues et civilisations orientales. ISBN 978-2-85831-107-1.
- Centar za mitološki studije Srbije (2006). Mitološki zbornik. Vol. 1–6. Belgrade: Centar za mitološki studije Srbije. pp. 54, 58, 123, 152, 313.
- Jireček, Konstantin Josef (1967). Geschichte der Serben (in German). Vol. 2.
- Jovičić, V.; Petrović, M.; Jovičić, O. (1988). Kosovo u svesti i nadahnuću Srpskoga naroda. Nova knjiga. pp. 125–126.
- Popović, Tanya (1988). Prince Marko: The Hero of South Slavic Epics. Syracuse University Press. ISBN 978-0-81562-444-8.
- Šijaković, Miodrag B. (1989). Gvero, Mladen; Nikolić, Nataša (eds.). Miloš Obilić: epski junak i legenda. Belgrade: Zajednica književnih klubova Srbije. pp. 6, 194.
- Simonović, Dragoljub (1992). Nikola Vratković – kosovski car i bog: rezultati istraživanja kosovskih pesama i kosovske legende, priroda i poreklo knjiga carostavnih, nikolijanstvo. Prosveta. pp. 133, 214–215. ISBN 9788674550809.
- Škrivanić, Gavro A. (1956). Kosovska bitka, 15 juna 1389. Podgorica: Istoriski institut NR Crne Gore. p. 52.
- Univerzitet u Novom Sadu; Univerzitet u Beogradu (1975). Godišnjak. Vol. 17. Novi Sad: Filozofski fakultet u Novom Sadu. pp. 215–218.
- Łoś, Jan, ed. (1912). "Czasów popisanie o tureckich sprawach przez Konstantego syna Michała Konstantynowica z Ostrowice Raca, jen był wzięt od Turkow miedzy janczary". Pamiętniki Janczara czyli Kronika Turecka Konstantego z Ostrowicy napisana między r. 1496 a 1501. Kraków: Akademia Umiejętności.
