= David Ungnad von Sonnegg =

European diplomat (1535–1600)

David Ungnad von Sonnegg Dominum Davidem Ungnad, Liberum Baronem de Sonnek, Præfečium Confili Bellici, qui pluribus Annis

Holy Roman Empire Ambassador to the Ottoman Empire
- In office 1572–1572

Holy Roman Empire Ambassador to the Ottoman Empire
- In office 1574–1578

Personal details
- Born: 1 January 1535
- Died: 22 December 1600 (aged 65) Košice
- Spouse(s): His wife Eva Lang, Freiin von Wellenburg, gave birth to four sons and three daughters.
- Parents: Andreas II. Freiherr von Ungnad, Brother of Hans von Ungnad, lived mostly in Bohemia, where he had the Veste and rule Frauenberg on the Vltava River along with other estates, but died in 1557 at Sonnegg in Carinthia, and rests in the church to Bleiburg. (father); Bohunka von Pernstein from Moravia (mother)
- Relatives: Brother Adam
- Education: University of Tübingen inscription disputed

David Ungnad von Sonnegg was the Holy Roman Ambassador to the Ottoman Empire from 1572 to 1578. He was sent by Maximilian II, Holy Roman Emperor and accredited by Sultan Selim II.

== Career ==
Sonnegg served Frederick II of Denmark during the Northern Seven Years' War from 1563 to 1570. He travelled to Constantinople in 1572 as envoy of Holy Roman Emperor Maximillian II, carrying a tribute to the Sultan. Sonnegg was accompanied by a retinue of 20, including the Flemish courtier and diarist Lambert Wyts, who wrote a book on his experiences in Turkey. He retained the ambassadorship until 1578.

Ungnad was involved in a counterintelligence mission involving "reporting on, and attempting to prevent, an Ottoman spy mission" operated by a recent convert to Islam named Markus Penckner.

In 1593 he became imperial Geheimrat and Hofkriegspräsident.

Sonnegg is buried in Horn, Austria.

== Stephan Gerlach the elder ==
- In 1573 a truce between the Ottoman and Holy Roman empires ceased, concluded each other at more or less regular intervals, and Vienna sent a young nobleman to the Porte for a new eight-year term with Sultan Selim II negotiate and pay high tribute; then he was to take the permanent ambassador post in Constantinople.
- It was the imperial baron David Ungnad from Carinthia, who had been on official mission on the Bosphorus before and offered himself for such a task especially through his extensive language skills.
- Ungnad came from a family whose members had joined most of the Reformation movement. He lived quite consciously and with some theological knowledge according to Lutheran doctrine, for which he even took restrictions in his political career. Difficulties arose for him when it came to contacts with the Spanish line of the Habsburgs and their territory, in the domain of the emperor many ways were open to him.
- Maximilian II, Holy Roman Emperor, sympathized with the Reformation and was the only emperor of the Reformation age who respected the legal system of religious peace.
- An ambassador needed a pastor for himself and the staff. For Ungnad, and evidently his environment as well, it was natural that he chose a Protestant preacher, even if that had never happened before. He turned to the Protestant areas; especially close was the contact with Austria, from where students - nobles and citizens - came to the University of Württemberg, and whose Protestant estates from there demanded men to fill the "higher places of their newly founded church and school system", since there was no corresponding training center in the country itself.
- On March 13, 1573 Ungnad asked the chancellor Faculty of Tübingen, Jacob Andreae for a Protestant preacher for the mission in Constantinople.
- Stephan Gerlach the elder became preacher of the mission and reported to Martin Crusius.
- On November 13, 1577 Gerlach described in his diary the founding of the Constantinople Observatory of Taqi ad-Din, while Tycho Brahe served Frederick II of Denmark with astronomical and planetary observations in Ven (Sweden).
