= Saint-Germain-sous-Cailly =

- Commune
- Location of Saint-Germain-sous-Cailly
- Location within France Location within Normandy
- Coordinates: 49°34′47″N 1°12′24″E
- Country: France
- Region: Normandy
- Department: Seine-Maritime
- Arrondissement: Rouen
- Canton: Le Mesnil-Esnard

Government
  - Mayor (2026–32): François Dupuis
- Area^{1}: 4.01 km^{2} (1.55 sq mi)
- Elevation: 114 m (374 ft)
- Highest elevation: 173 m (568 ft)
- Lowest elevation: 102 m (335 ft)
- Population (2023): 305
  - Density: 76.1/km^{2} (197/sq mi)
- Time zone: UTC+01:00 (CET)
  - Summer (DST): UTC+02:00 (CEST)
- INSEE/Postal code: 76583 /76690
- ^{1} French Land Register data, which excludes lakes, ponds, glaciers > 1 km^{2} (0.386 sq mi or 247 acres) and river estuaries.

Saint-Germain-sous-Cailly (French pronunciation: [sɛ̃ ʒɛʁmɛ̃ su kaji], literally Saint-Germain under Cailly) is a commune in the Seine-Maritime department in the Normandy region in north-western France.

Its castle was the burial place of Ogier Ghiselin de Busbecq.

== Geography ==
A small farming village situated by the banks of the Cailly in the Pays de Bray, some 14 miles (23 km) northeast of Rouen on the D44 road.

== Population ==
Historical population
Year	Pop.	±% p.a.
1968	83	—
1975	105	+3.42%
1982	127	+2.75%
1990	141	+1.32%
1999	210	+4.53%
2007	266	+3.00%
2012	346	+5.40%
2017	344	−0.12%
2023	305	−1.99%
Source: INSEE

== Places of interest ==
- Ruins of a thirteenth-century castle, owned by the family of Boissay.
- A seventeenth-century chateau.

== See also ==
- Communes of the Seine-Maritime department
