= Benedikt Kuripečič =

Slovenian diplomat (1491–1531)

- Born: Gornji Grad
- Occupation: 16th-century diplomat of the Habsburg monarchy of Slovenian origin
- Known for: being author of notable itinerary about his 1530 journey from Ljubljana to Constantinople

Benedikt Kuripečič or Benedikt Kuripešić (German: Benedict Curipeschitz von Obernburg, 1491–1531) was a 16th-century Slovene diplomat who recorded epic songs about Miloš Obilić.

Kuripečič was born in Gornji Grad, then part of the Habsburg Empire, now Slovenia. He entered the diplomatic service of the Habsburg monarchy and served in Moscow and Istanbul.

His notable works include records of his journey through Serbia in 1530 (Itinerarium Wegrayß. Kü[niglicher] May[estät] potschafft gen Constantinopel zů dem Türckischen Kayser Soleyman. Anno xxx) (Itinerary: The journey of the Ambassador of His Royal Majesty to Constantinople to the Turkish Emperor Suleiman. In the Year 1530) when he traveled to Istanbul as a translator in the service of King Ferdinand. His records describe emigration of people from Serbia to Bosnia in 1530. In his work he recorded some legends about the Battle of Kosovo and mentions epic songs about Miloš Obilić in regions far from Kosovo, such as Bosnia and Croatia. According to his records, the Ottoman Empire lost the battle. He traveled through the territory of Kosovo and mentioned songs about the heroic deeds of Miloš Obilić and his unjustified slander.

== See also ==
- List of Austrian ambassadors to Turkey
