= Minuscule 722 =

- New Testament manuscript
- Text: Gospel of Matthew, Mark, Luke
- Date: 15th century
- Script: Greek
- Now at: Austrian National Library
- Size: 28.8 cm by 21 cm
- Type: mixed
- Category: none
- Note: –

Minuscule 722 (in the Gregory-Aland numbering), Θ^{ε54} (von Soden), is a Greek minuscule manuscript of the New Testament, on paper. Palaeographically it has been assigned to the 15th century. Scrivener labelled it as 827^{e}. The manuscript has survived in a fragmentary condition.

== Description ==
The codex contains the text of the Gospel of Matthew, Gospel of Mark, and Gospel of Luke, on 140 paper leaves (size 28.8 cm by 21 cm), with lacunae.

Contents

Matthew 1:1-28:20; Mark 1:1-10:9; Luke 1:1-15:7.

The text is written in one columns per page, 31 lines per page.

The text of the codex is divided according to the κεφαλαια (chapters), whose numbers are given at the margin of the text and their τιτλοι (titles of chapters) are given at the top. It contains lectionary markings at the margin (for liturgical use).

It contains a commentary of Theophylact.

== History ==
Gregory dated the manuscript to the 15th century. The manuscript is dated by the INTF to the 15th century.

Busbecq brought the manuscript from Constantinople.

It was added to the list of New Testament manuscripts by Scrivener (827) and Gregory (722). Gregory saw the manuscript in 1887.

The manuscript is housed at the Austrian National Library in Vienna.

== See also ==
- List of New Testament minuscules
- Biblical manuscript
- Textual criticism
