= Minuscule 719 =

- New Testament manuscript
- Text: Gospels
- Date: 1196
- Script: Greek
- Now at: Austrian National Library
- Size: 34.5 cm by 26.5 cm
- Type: mixed/Byzantine
- Category: none
- Note: –

Minuscule 719 (in the Gregory-Aland numbering), Θ^{ε24} (von Soden), is a Greek minuscule manuscript of the New Testament, on paper. It is dated by a Colophon to the year 1196. The manuscript has complex contents. Scrivener labelled it as 824^{e}.

== Description ==
The codex contains the text of the four Gospels, on 314 paper leaves (size 34.5 cm by 26.5 cm).

The text is written in one column per page, 34-40 lines per page.

It contains a Theophylact's commentary to the Gospels.

The text was written by two hands. It contains some extracts from Photius and one anonymous author at the end.

== Text ==
The Greek text of the codex is mixed. Kurt Aland did not place it in any Category.

It was not examined by using Claremont Profile Method.

It lacks the Pericope Adulterae (John 7:53-8:11).

== History ==
According to the colophon it was written in 1196, by Paulus, a monk.

Formerly the manuscript was held in Constantinople. Busbecq brought the manuscript from Constantinople to Vienna.

It was added to the list of New Testament manuscripts by Scrivener (824) and Gregory (719). Gregory saw the manuscript in 1887.

At present the manuscript is housed at the Austrian National Library (Theol. gr. 19, fol. 1–314) in Vienna.

== See also ==
- List of New Testament minuscules
- Biblical manuscript
- Textual criticism
