= Jelka Ređep =

Serbian medieval historian (1936–2014)

- Јелка Ређеп
- Born: Jelka Petrović; 27 April 1936; Novi Sad, Kingdom of Yugoslavia
- Died: 18 December 2014 (aged 78); Novi Sad, Serbia
- Occupations: Literary historian, academic, author

Academic background
- Education: University of Novi Sad (MA, PhD)
- Thesis: The Story of the Kosovo Battle (1972)

Academic work
- Discipline: Literary history; Medieval literature
- Sub-discipline: Medieval and folk literature, Serbian medieval studies
- Institutions: University of Novi Sad; University of Niš; University of Berlin; University of Halle; University of Regensburg
- Notable works: The Story of the Kosovo Battle (1979); The Legend of King Zvonimir (1987); Sin and Divine Punishment: Fates, Battles, and Traditions of the Serbian Middle Ages (2013)

Jelka Ređep (née Petrović) (Serbian: Јелка Ређеп; 27 April 1936 – 18 December 2014) was a Serbian literary historian and professor specialising in medieval Serbian literature and oral tradition. A longtime faculty member at the University of Novi Sad, her research focused in particular on the Kosovo legend and the relationship between written and oral traditions.

== Early life and education ==
Jelka Petrović was born in Novi Sad, Kingdom of Yugoslavia on 27 April 1936. She completed her primary and secondary education in her hometown. She graduated from the Faculty of Philosophy at the University of Novi Sad in 1959, majoring in Yugoslav literature and languages. She earned her master's degree with a thesis titled The Motif of the Birth of Sibinjanin Janko in Old and Folk Literature and later obtained her doctorate with the dissertation The Story of the Kosovo Battle.

== Academic career ==
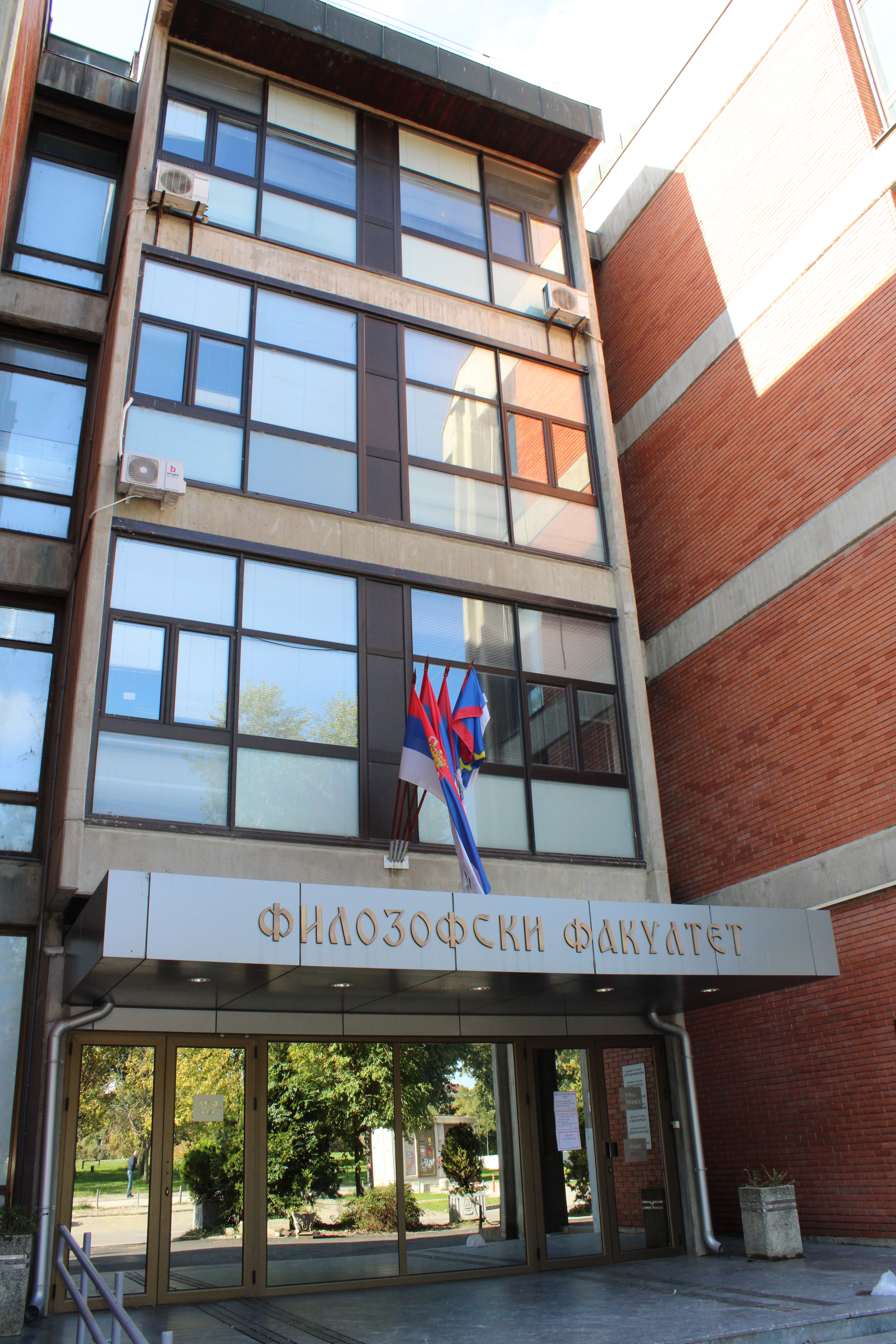
The Faculty of Philosophy in Novi Sad.

In 1963, Ređep began her academic career as an assistant professor at the Faculty of Philosophy in Novi Sad where she taught Medieval literature and Folk Literature. She worked under the mentorship of Đorđe Sp. Radojčić and Vladan Nedić. She was promoted to associate professor in 1979 and to full professor in 1988. During her tenure, she served as head of the Department of Serbian Literature and coordinated postgraduate studies. She also held a professorship at the Faculty of Philosophy in Niš.

Ređep presented papers at international conferences in Belgrade, Sarajevo, Zagreb, Kyiv, Jerusalem, and Leeds, among other locations. She was a visiting professor at universities in Berlin, Halle, and Regensburg.

== Research and contributions ==
Ređep’s research focused on the analysis of medieval manuscripts and documents, with particular attention to their transmission and variation. Her main research interest was the comparative study of medieval written literature and folk tradition, especially the relationship between oral and written forms. She also studied figures from medieval Serbian history by examining both contemporary texts and later literary traditions associated with them.

A central part of Ređep’s research concerned the Kosovo legend, looking at its historical background, literary development and transmission in both written and oral form. Through manuscript comparison, she traced changes in the narrative over time and analysed recurring motifs such as heroism, betrayal, and divine fate. She identified 18 previously unknown manuscript variants of The Story of the Kosovo Battle. According to Svetlana Tomin, Ređep analysed how Kosovo narratives contributed to Serbian cultural memory.

Beyond the Kosovo tradition, Ređep also studied medieval Serbian rulers, including Prince Lazar, members of the Branković dynasty and Miloš Obilić, focusing on their representation in literary and folk sources. She carried out a detailed study of Đorđe Branković's chronicles which resulted in a series of articles and comprehensive studies on early modern Serbian historiography. Her final publication, Sin and Divine Punishment: Fates, Battles, and Traditions of the Serbian Middle Ages, compiled several of her previously published studies. Her publications continue to be cited in research on medieval Serbian literature and related literary traditions.

== Awards and recognition ==
Throughout her career, Ređep received several academic and cultural awards. These included:

- November Charter of Novi Sad (1994), awarded for contributions to the cultural life of the city.
- Vuk's Award (1995), a Serbian national cultural award.
- Milica Stojadinović Srpkinja Award (2006), recognising her research in Serbian literary history.
- Lifetime Achievement Award from the Association of Serbian Writers (2011).
- Pavle Marković Adamov Award (2013).

== Personal life and death ==
Jelka Ređep was married to Draško Ređep, a Serbian writer and critic. She died on 18 December 2014 in Novi Sad at the age of 78. A commemoration took place on 22 December 2014 at the Cultural Center of Novi Sad. Ređep's funeral took place at Novi Sad Cemetery.

== Legacy ==
In studies of medieval Serbian literature, Ređep’s work is widely cited particularly in research on the Kosovo legend, medieval historiography and the relationship between written texts and oral tradition.

== Published works ==
A selection of publications by Jelka Ređep:

- (1979) The Story of the Battle of Kosovo.
- (1987) The Legend of King Zvonimir.
- (1991) Ređep, Jelka (1991). Count Đorđe Branković and Oral Tradition (in Serbian). IKA Prometej. ISBN 978-86-7639-004-5.
- (1992) Janko of Sibin: legends about birth and death. Književno-umetnička zadruga "Slavija". 1992. ISBN 978-86-431-0024-0.
- (1994) Kosovo Legend. Studije i eseji. Slavija. 1994. ISBN 978-86-431-0050-9.
- (1997) Folk songs about Kosovo in Bulgarian and short epic poems. Zavod za udžbenike i nastavna sredstva. 1997. ISBN 978-86-17-05376-3. (with Rade Mihaljčić)
- (2006) They Muddied the Clear Water: The Quarrel Between Prince Lazar's Daughters.
- (2010) Ređep, Jelka (2010). The Life of Prince Lazar (in Serbian). Prometej. ISBN 978-86-515-0432-0.
- (2010) Ređep, Jelka (2010). Catherine Kantakouzene: Countess of Celje (in Serbian). Zavod za udžbenike. ISBN 978-86-17-16920-4.
- (2013) Ređep, Jelka (2013). Грех и казна Божија: судбине, битке и предања српског средњег века [Sin and Divine Punishment: Fates, Battles, and Traditions of the Serbian Middle Ages] (in Serbian). Prometej. ISBN 978-86-515-0866-3..
