= Deacon Ignjatije =

14th-century Russian deacon

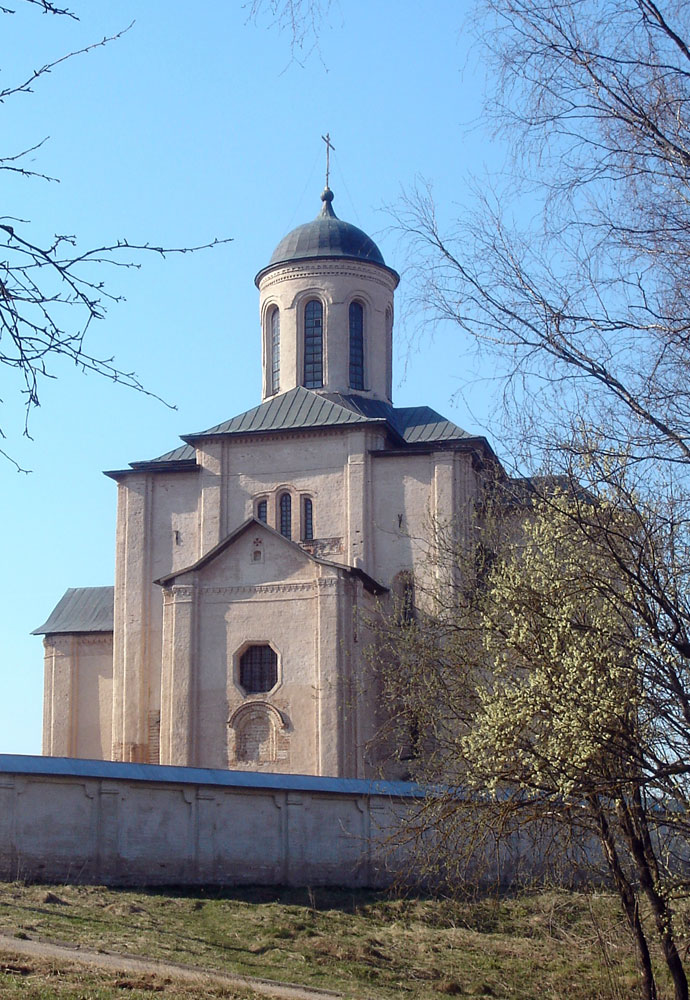
- St. Michael's Church in Smolensk
- Born: Игнатий; 14th century
- Occupation: deacon
- Known for: author of the earliest record about the Battle of Kosovo

Deacon Ignjatije (Serbian: Ђакон Игњатије) was a Russian deacon who accompanied Metropolitan Pimen during his travel to Constantinople at the end of the 14th century. Ignjatije was also mentioned as Grk Ignjatije of the Church of Archangel Michael in Smolensk. Together with the hieromonk of his church, the bishop Michael, and Metropolitan Pimen, he traveled to Constantinople and its region in 1389.

Ignjatije wrote the earliest record about the Battle of Kosovo, only 12 days after the battle. He recorded that a man who loyally served Prince Lazar (Serbian: у цара српскога Лазара неки верни слуга) was slandered as traitor. With intention to prove his loyalty during the battle this man pretended that he deserted Lazar's troops, went to the sultan Murad I and killed him. The name of this man is added (Miloš) to some later transcripts of Ignjatije's original text although it was not presented in the original manuscript.
