= Markus Penckner =

17th-century Transylvanian spy for the Ottoman Empire

- Born: fl. 1572; Principality of Transylvania, Ottoman Empire ?
- Died: fl. 1592; Istanbul, Ottoman Empire ?
- Other names: Ahmed
- Occupation: Spy
- Employer(s): Sultans Selim II and Murad III

Markus Penckner (fl. 1572 – fl. 1592) was a Transylvanian renegade who migrated to Istanbul in 1572 alongside his friend Adam Neuser, who was a Protestant preacher from Heidelberg, to work as spies for the Ottoman Empire. Their requests were granted by Sultan Selim II, and both remained spies for the Ottomans throughout what can be seen in records of their lives. Both Penckner and Neuser had converted to Islam.

== Personal life ==
Almost nothing is known of Penckner's early life other than that he was a Christian who converted to Islam alongside Neuser in 1573 in Istanbul, taking on the name of Ahmed. His reason for migrating with Neuser to Istanbul may be because of the attractiveness of working in the Ottoman court as a foreigner as they were compensated handsomely for their services since the Ottomans accommodated diversity in the court.

Penckner's Italian, Hungarian, German, and Wallachian were described as 'perfect' by the ambassador of the Holy Roman Empire to the Ottoman Empire, David Ungnad von Sonnegg. His Turkish was also good enough for him to communicate with Grand Vizier Sokollu Mehmed Pasha with ease.

== Life in the Ottoman Empire ==
Penckner was tasked with infiltrating the Spanish court as an Ottoman returnee. He was expected to return after six to twelve months to Istanbul and report on his findings. In a secret meeting with Italian condottiero and general Gabrio Serbelloni before Penckner traveled to Spain, he successfully tricked Serbelloni, a close friend of King Philip II, into thinking that he was an ally of the Spanish by telling him that he wanted to leave the Ottoman Empire for Spain in order to return to Christianity. However, the HRE's ambassador David Ungnad was made aware of reconnaissance plans from January, informing Emperor Maximilian II for months about all information he could gather on the case. As a result of this, Penckner returned to Istanbul a mere six weeks after landing in Spain, claiming to have been betrayed and his cover blown.

Ungnad was very keen to neutralise Penckner, as characterised by his statement:

"To liquidate such a harmful and godless man... would be worth all effort."

Penckner met with Ungnad in June 1575, attempting to convince him that he was not a spy but that he was forced to create such a story because his life was at risk. Ungnad remained unconvinced, referring to Penckner in his letter to Maximilian II by stating:

"The Earth should swallow such a wicked man."

Although Penckner was unsuccessful in his task in Spain, he was known to have been the patron of renegades such as Mahmud, head of the dragomans of the Porte, and Aur (first name unknown), who was captured in Turkish Croatia in 1585. Both were German converts to Islam. After Aur died in 1592, Penckner inherited his house and married his widowed wife. There is no mention of Penckner after this event.
