= Kobiljačić =

- family
- Founded: Before 1349
- Estate: Sopoštica
- Dissolution: 1434

The Kobiljačić (Serbian Cyrillic: Кобиљачићи) was a family in the Trebinje region whose members were mentioned in the period between 1349 and 1434, mostly involving orchestrated thefts on the territory of the Republic of Ragusa. The most known member, Vukosav, was a local magnate in the service of Pavle Radenović of the Kingdom of Bosnia, and was mentioned several times in Ragusan complaints.

== History ==
In the Middle Ages, the Trebinje Hinterland (Trebinjska Zagora) was an important center, which was often mentioned from 1325 and on. It was part of the župa (county) of Popovo. Part of the border of the Popovo župa crossed the Trebinje Hinterland. The Kobiljačić family is known to have lived in the Hinterland and had estates in Popovo and other places in the Trebinje region.

Vojislav Kobiljačić is mentioned as having sold cattle in Ragusa (modern-day Dubrovnik) in 1349. The family is mentioned in 1362. In the beginning of 1373, Vojislav was mentioned with his son Mrkočela, and the following Kobiljačići: Vukosav and his son Stanihna, Novak and his son Mladen and brother Bjelica. The Kobiljačić are believed to have been called Kobilić (Кобилић) and Kobilanović (Кобилановић), as well. In 1390, a "Kobilić" is mentioned as the knez (duke) of Župa. Bjelinče Kobiljačić and his nobles from the hinterland are mentioned in 1412–13.

Vukosav (Вукосав Кобиљачић; fl. 1397–1413) was a nobleman in Trebinje in the service of Pavle Radinović (fl. 1381–d. 1415), a magnate of the Kingdom of Bosnia. When Pavle Radinović issued a charter for the rights of Ragusan merchants to trade freely on his land (1397), the three witnesses, "from the maritime" (pomorje), were Vukosav Kobiljačić, Ljubiša Bogdančić and Vukosav Poznanović. Vukosav was present in a number of complaints filed in Ragusa, such as one time when he stole cattle in Začula. In September 1412, a Priboje complained to the Ragusan court that he had found out who stole his items and that the thieves were some peasants of Vukosav Kobiljačić, and the Ragusan court intervened. In 1413, Vukosav wrote to the Ragusan knez (count) Simko about the theft that his people had done in Zaton, a Ragusan territory. A 1413 document said that Vukosav's man Mirko Medošević from Sopoštica had received the cattle for holding (Mirchus Medosseuich de Sopostiza homo Vocoslaui Cobigliacich). Vukosav's estate was Sopoštica, which was abandoned during the Ottoman conquest.

In 1434, a complaint against two people of Vukašin Kobiljačić was filed in Ragusa.

== Connection to Miloš Obilić ==
It has been theorized that Miloš Obilić, the legendary assassin of the Ottoman sultan Murad I during the Battle of Kosovo (1389), originated from this family.

== See also ==
Among noble families in the Trebinje region mentioned in Ragusan documents were Ljubibratić, Starčić, Popović, Krasomirić, Preljubović, Poznanović, Dragančić, Kobiljačić, Paštrović, Zemljić and Stanjević.
