= Klaus Wölfer =

Austrian diplomat

Klaus Wölfer (born 5 April 1956) is an Austrian diplomat.

== Career ==
After graduating from Vienna University's Law School and the Diplomatic Academy in Vienna, Wölfer joined the Austrian Ministry of Foreign Affairs in 1981.

He worked in the Austrian Embassies in Rome (from 1983) and Belgrade (Yugoslavia) from 1986, as well as in Budapest, Hungary (1990/91) and Zagreb, Croatia, (1991). Until 1995 he headed a unit within the Ministry for Foreign Affairs dealing with the conflicts and crises of "Former Yugoslavia".

In 1996 Wölfer was appointed director of the Austrian Cultural Forum in Rome.

In 2002 he returned to Vienna to be Director General for the Federal Funding of the Arts ("Kunstsektion") within the Federal Chancellery (Prime Minister's Office; until 2006). During this time he was i.a. in charge of the organisation and conception of the conference “The Sound of Europe” (Salzburg, January 2006), designed as kick-off event for the Austrian EU Council Presidency.

In 2007 Wölfer became Ambassador to Indonesia (resident in Jakarta), with co-accreditations for Singapore and East-Timor as well as for ASEAN. During this period, he oversaw the construction of the new ecological “green” embassy building in Jakarta, which subsequently has served as a model for similar constructions.

From 2012 until 2017 Wölfer served as Austrian Ambassador to Turkey, in Ankara.

Since September 2017 he has been heading the Department for Southeast Europe and EU-Enlargement at Vienna's Foreign Ministry. In addition, he was appointed Deputy Director General for Bilateral Affairs (“Deputy Political Director”) in March 2019.

== Personal life ==
Klaus Wölfer is married and has two daughters.
