= 1939 =

1939 in various calendars
- Gregorian calendar: 1939; MCMXXXIX
- Ab urbe condita: 2692
- Armenian calendar: 1388; ԹՎ ՌՅՁԸ
- Assyrian calendar: 6689
- Baháʼí calendar: 95–96
- Balinese saka calendar: 1860–1861
- Bengali calendar: 1345–1346
- Berber calendar: 2889
- British Regnal year: 3 Geo. 6 – 4 Geo. 6
- Buddhist calendar: 2483
- Burmese calendar: 1301
- Byzantine calendar: 7447–7448
- Chinese calendar: 戊寅年 (Earth Tiger); 4636 or 4429 — to — 己卯年 (Earth Rabbit); 4637 or 4430
- Coptic calendar: 1655–1656
- Discordian calendar: 3105
- Ethiopian calendar: 1931–1932
- Hebrew calendar: 5699–5700
- Hindu calendars
- Vikram Samvat: 1995–1996
- Shaka Samvat: 1860–1861
- Kali Yuga: 5039–5040
- Holocene calendar: 11939
- Igbo calendar: 939–940
- Iranian calendar: 1317–1318
- Islamic calendar: 1357–1358
- Japanese calendar: Shōwa 14 (昭和１４年)
- Javanese calendar: 1869–1870
- Juche calendar: 28
- Julian calendar: Gregorian minus 13 days
- Korean calendar: 4272
- Minguo calendar: ROC 28 民國28年
- Nanakshahi calendar: 471
- Thai solar calendar: 2481–2482
- Tibetan calendar: ས་ཕོ་སྟག་ལོ་ (male Earth-Tiger); 2065 or 1684 or 912 — to — ས་མོ་ཡོས་ལོ་ (female Earth-Hare); 2066 or 1685 or 913

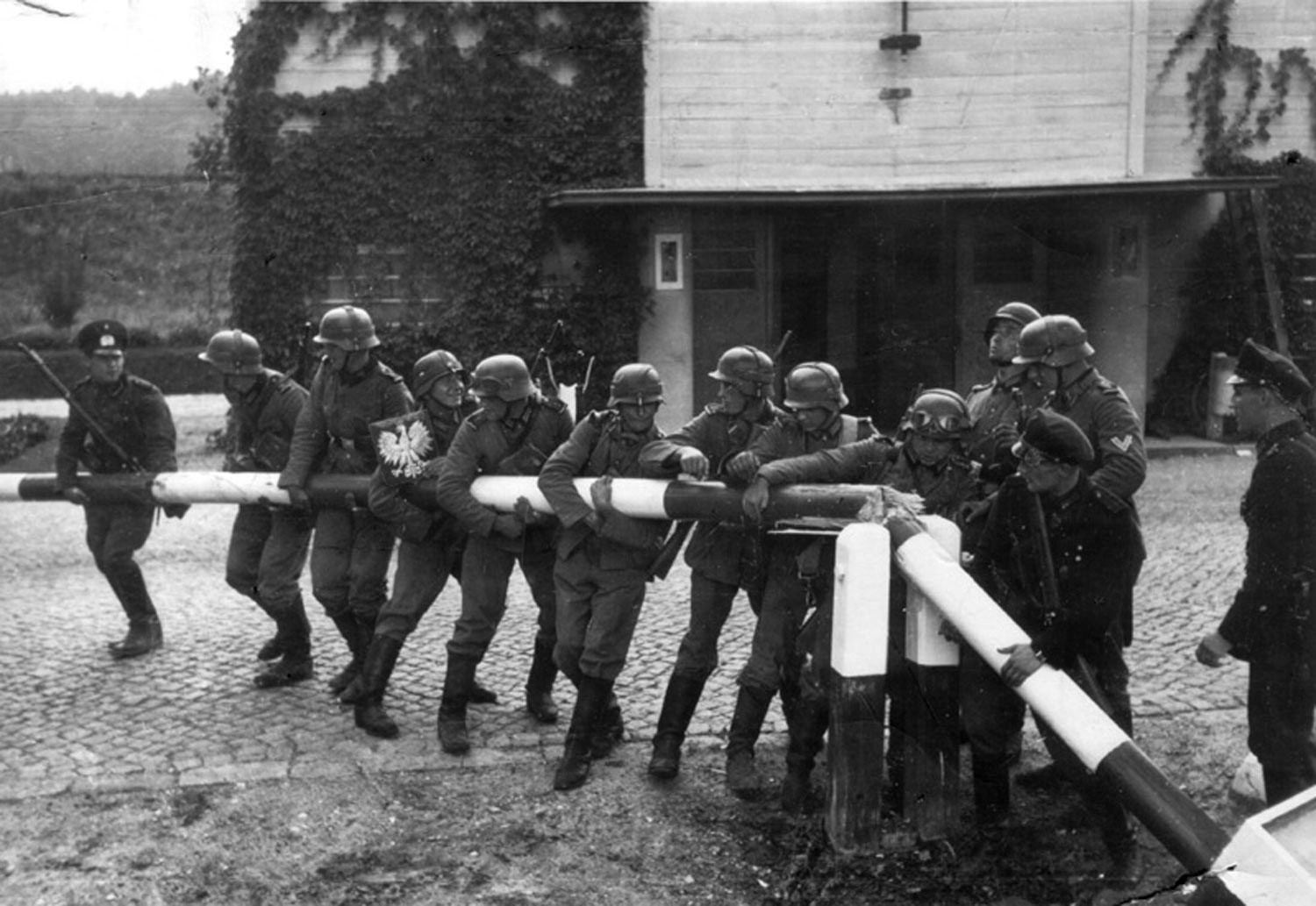
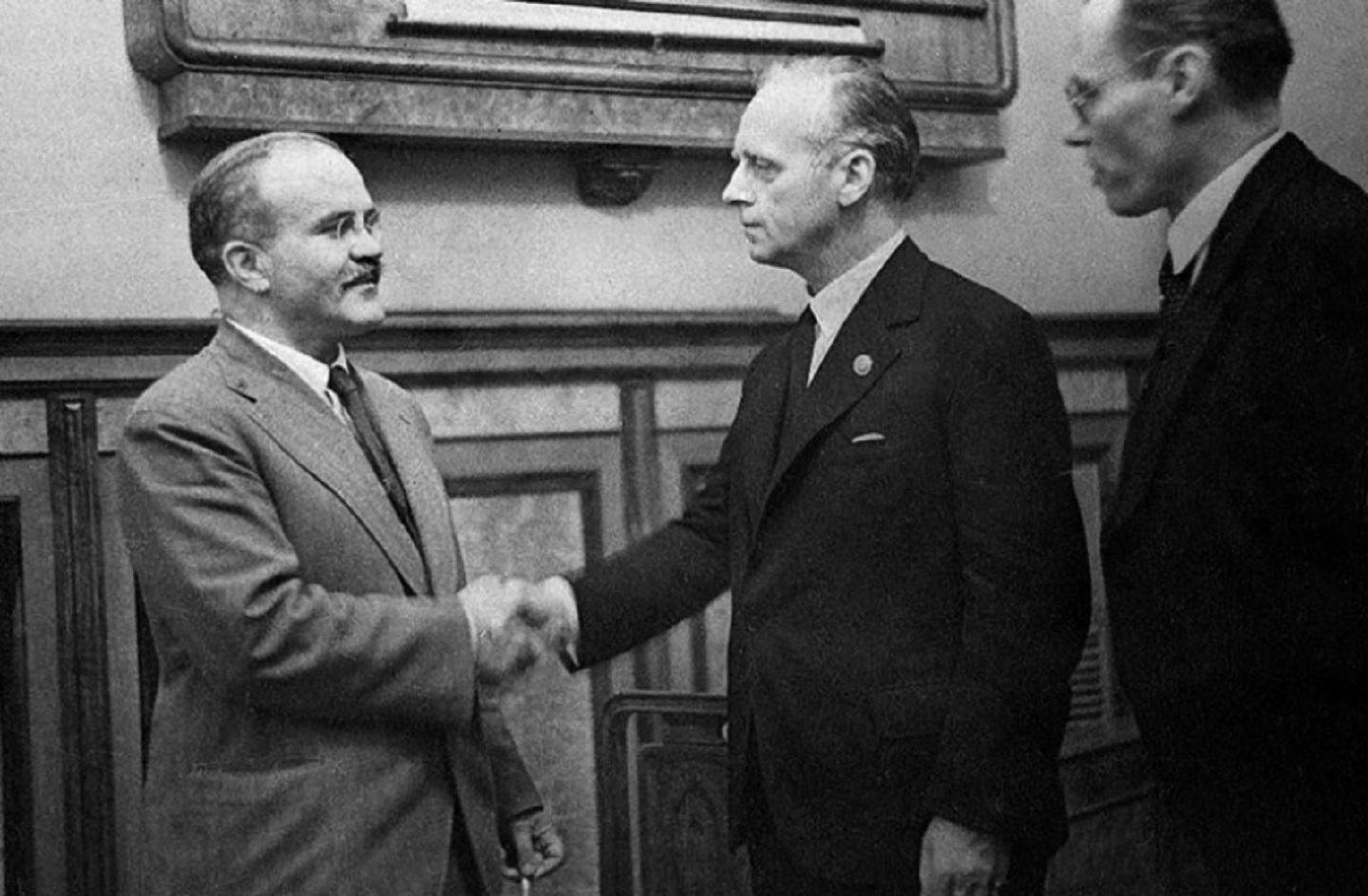
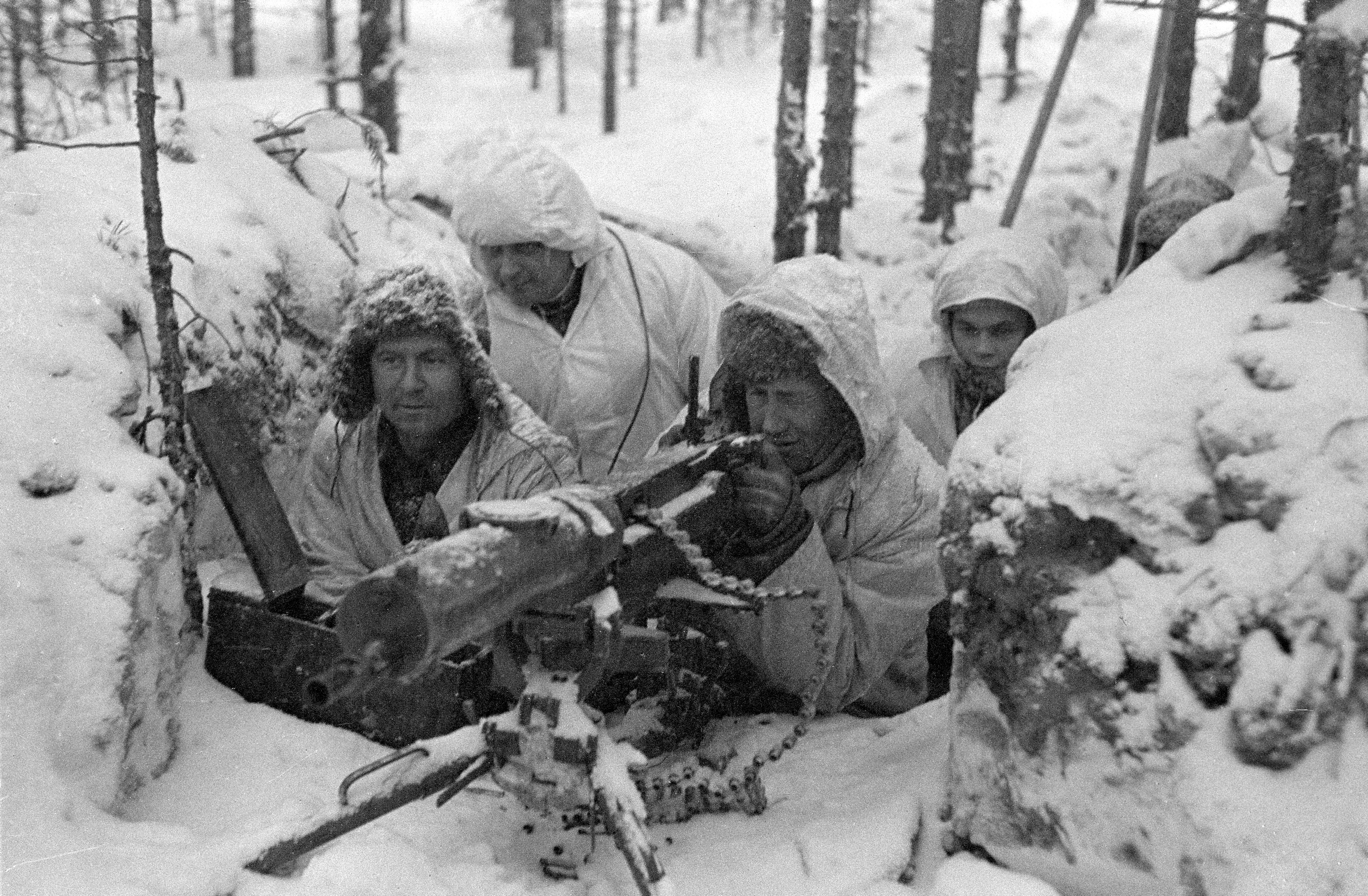
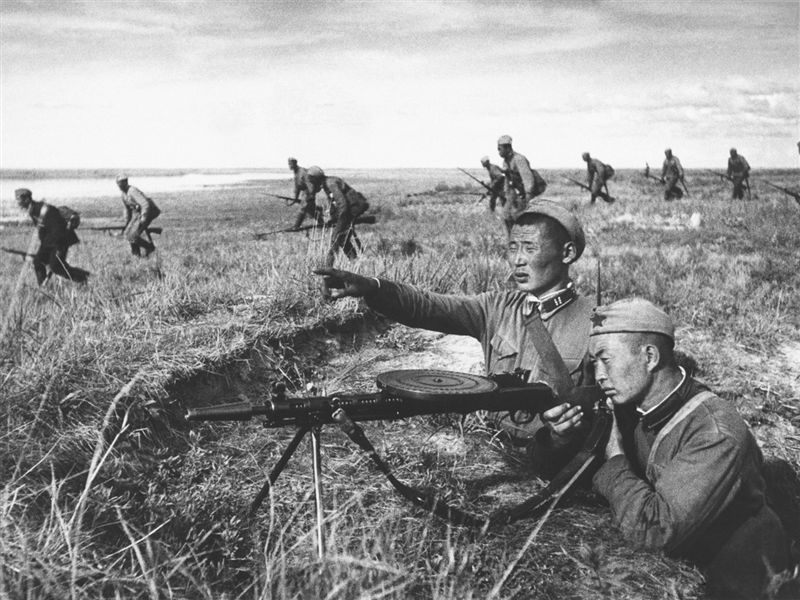
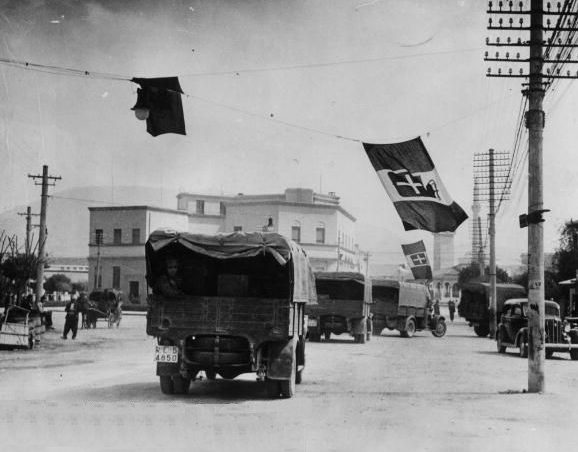
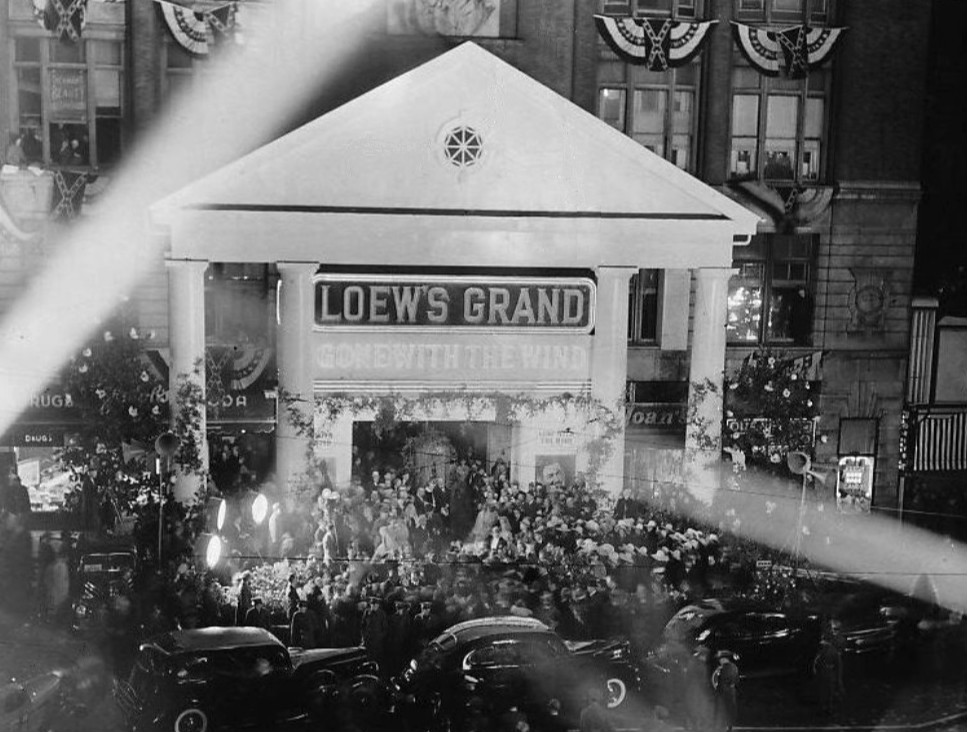
From top to bottom, left to right:
- The Invasion of Poland by Nazi Germany on September 1 triggers World War II as Britain and France declare war;
- The Molotov–Ribbentrop Pact between Germany and the Soviet Union establishes a non-aggression treaty with secret plans to divide Eastern Europe;
- The Winter War breaks out as the Soviet Union invades Finland, leading to fierce resistance and heavy losses on both sides;
- The Battles of Khalkhin Gol see Soviet and Mongolian forces decisively defeat the Japanese in Manchuria, halting Japanese expansion into Siberia;
- The Italian invasion of Albania results in the swift occupation of the country, expanding Mussolini's influence in the Balkans;
- The release of Gone with the Wind becomes a cultural milestone, later recognized as one of the most iconic and successful films in cinema history.

1939 (MCMXXXIX) was a common year starting on Sunday of the Gregorian calendar, the 1939th year of the Common Era (CE) and Anno Domini (AD) designations, the 939th year of the 2nd millennium, the 39th year of the 20th century, and the 10th and last year of the 1930s decade.

This year also marks the start of the Second World War, the largest and deadliest conflict in human history.

== Events ==
Events related to World War II have a "WWII" prefix.

=== January ===
- January 1
  - Coming into effect in Nazi Germany of:
    - The Protection of Young Persons Act, passed on April 30, 1938, the Working Hours Regulations.
    - The small businesses obligation to maintain adequate accounting.
    - The Jews name change decree.
  - With his traditional call to the New Year in Nazi Germany, Führer and Reich Chancellor Adolf Hitler addresses the members of the National Socialist German Workers' Party (NSDAP).
  - The Hewlett-Packard technology and scientific instruments manufacturing company is founded by Bill Hewlett and David Packard, in a garage in Palo Alto, California, considered the birthplace of Silicon Valley.
  - Philipp Etter takes over as President of the Swiss Confederation.
  - The Third Soviet Five Year Plan is launched.
- January 5 – Pioneering U.S. aviator Amelia Earhart is officially declared dead, eighteen months after her disappearance.
- January 6 – Otto Hahn's discoveries in the field of nuclear fission are published in Naturwissenschaften.
- January 7 – French physicist Marguerite Perey identifies francium, the last chemical element first discovered in nature.
- January 14 – Norway claims Queen Maud Land in Antarctica.
- January 23 – "Dutch War Scare": Admiral Wilhelm Canaris of the Abwehr leaks misinformation to the effect that Germany plans to invade the Netherlands in February, with the aim of using Dutch air-fields to launch a strategic bombing offensive against Britain. The "Dutch War Scare" leads to a major change in British policies towards Europe.
- January 24 – 1939 Chillán earthquake: An earthquake in Chile kills an estimated 30,000 people and razes about 50,000 sq mi (130,000 km^{2}) of land.
- January 25 – Refik Saydam forms the new (11th) government of Turkey.
- January 26
  - Spanish Civil War: Spanish Nationalist troops, aided by Italy, take Barcelona.
  - In Paris, French Foreign Minister Georges Bonnet, in response to rumours (which are true) that he is seeking to end the French alliance system in Eastern Europe, gives a speech highlighting his government's commitment to the cordon sanitaire.
- January 27 – Adolf Hitler orders Plan Z, a 5-year naval expansion programme intended to provide for a huge German fleet capable of crushing the British Royal Navy by 1944. The Kriegsmarine is given the first priority on the allotment of German economic resources.
- January 30 – Hitler gives a speech before the Reichstag calling for an "export battle" to increase German foreign exchange holdings. The same speech also sees "Hitler's prophecy", where he warns that if "Jewish financiers" start a war against Germany, "the result will be the annihilation of the Jewish race in Europe".

=== February ===
- February 6
  - British Prime Minister Neville Chamberlain states in the House of Commons that any German attack on France will be automatically considered an attack on Britain.
  - In a response to Georges Bonnet's speech of January 26, German Foreign Minister Joachim von Ribbentrop, referring to Bonnet's alleged statement of December 6, 1938, accepting Eastern Europe as being in Germany's exclusive sphere of influence, protests that all French security commitments in that region are "now off limits".
- February 10 – Pope Pius XI, the head of the Roman Catholic Church since 1922, dies of a heart attack.
- February 18 – The Golden Gate International Exposition opens in San Francisco.
- February 27 – The United Kingdom and France recognize Franco's government in Spain.

=== March ===
- March – The 1936–39 Arab revolt in Palestine ends.
- March 1 – An Imperial Japanese Army ammunition dump explosion on the outskirts of Osaka kills 94.
- March 2 – Pope Pius XII (Cardinal Pacelli) succeeds Pope Pius XI to become the 260th pope, holding office until 1958.
- March 3 – In Durban, South Africa the Timeless Test begins between England and South Africa, the longest game of cricket ever played. It is abandoned 12 days later, when the English team has to catch their ship home.
- March 13 – Adolf Hitler advises Jozef Tiso to declare Slovakia's independence, in order to prevent its partition by Hungary and Poland.
- March 14 – The Slovak provincial assembly proclaims independence; priest Jozef Tiso becomes president of the independent Slovak government.
- March 15 – German troops occupy the remaining part of Bohemia and Moravia; Czechoslovakia ceases to exist. The Ruthenian region of Czechoslovakia declares independence as Carpatho-Ukraine.
- March 16
  - Hungary invades Carpatho-Ukraine; final resistance ends on March 18.
  - British Prime Minister Neville Chamberlain gives a speech in Birmingham, stating that Britain will oppose any effort at world domination on the part of Germany.
- March 17 – The nationalist governments of Spain and Portugal sign the Iberian Pact in Lisbon, pledging mutual defence of the Iberian Peninsula and neutrality in the event of a general European war.
- March 20
  - 1939 German ultimatum to Lithuania, requiring return of the Klaipėda Region (Memel Territory) to Germany.
  - At an emergency meeting in London to deal with the Romanian crisis, French Foreign Minister Georges Bonnet suggests to Lord Halifax that the ideal state for saving Romania from a German attack is Poland.
- March 22 – Following the March 20 ultimatum, Nazi Germany is granted the Klaipėda Region (Memel Territory, Memelland) by Lithuania; on the following day German forces occupy the territory.
- March 23 – The Slovak–Hungarian War begins.
- March 26 – Final offensive of the Spanish Civil War launched by the Nationalists.
- March 28
  - General Francisco Franco assumes power in Madrid, remaining in power until his death in 1975.
  - American adventurer Richard Halliburton delivers a last message from a Chinese junk, before he disappears on a voyage across the Pacific Ocean. In 1945, some wreckage identified as a rudder, and believed to belong to the junk, washes ashore in San Diego, California.
- March 30 – The superhero Batman debut for Detective Comics (issue #27) (cover date of May).
- March 31 – Neville Chamberlain gives a speech in the House of Commons, offering the British "guarantee" of the independence of Poland.

=== April ===
- April 1 – The Spanish Civil War comes to an end when the last of the Republican forces surrender.
- April 3
  - Adolf Hitler orders the German military to start planning for Fall Weiß, the codename for the invasion of Poland.
  - Refik Saydam forms the new government in Turkey (12th government; Refik Saydam has served twice as a prime minister).
- April 4
  - The Slovak–Hungarian War ends, with Slovakia ceding eastern territories to Hungary.
  - Polish Foreign Minister Colonel Józef Beck, in London, signs a treaty designed to bilateralize Neville Chamberlain's "Polish Guarantee" of March 31.
  - Faisal II becomes King of Iraq aged three, following the death of his father, Ghazi, in an automobile incident.
- April 7
  - Italian invasion of Albania begins; King Zog flees into exile, initially in Greece, with his wife and Crown Prince Skander (born April 5).
  - Joseph Lyons, 10th Prime Minister of Australia, dies in office from a heart attack at the age of 59. He is briefly replaced by his deputy Earle Page, who serves as the 11th Prime Minister, until a UAP leadership election is held to replace Lyons.
- April 9 – African-American singer Marian Anderson performs before 75,000 people at the Lincoln Memorial in Washington, D.C., after having been denied the use both of Constitution Hall by the Daughters of the American Revolution, and of a public high school by the federally controlled District of Columbia. First Lady of the United States Eleanor Roosevelt resigns from the DAR because of their decision.
- April 11 – Hungary leaves the League of Nations.
- April 14 – At a meeting in Paris, French Foreign Minister Georges Bonnet meets with Soviet Ambassador Jakob Suritz, and suggests that a "peace front" comprising France, the Soviet Union, Great Britain, Poland and Romania would deter Germany from war.
- April 18
  - The Soviet Union proposes a "peace front" to resist aggression.
  - Robert Menzies is elected leader of the United Australia Party, and consequently becomes the 12th Prime Minister of Australia, defeating former Prime Minister Billy Hughes. However, he will not be sworn in until April 26, because of the refusal of Earle Page and his Country Party to serve under him.
- April 25 – The Federal Security Agency (FSA) is founded in the United States, along with the Civilian Conservation Corps and Public Health Service.
- April 28 – In a speech before the Reichstag, Adolf Hitler renounces the Anglo-German Naval Agreement and the German–Polish declaration of non-aggression.
- April 30 – The 1939 New York World's Fair opens.

=== May ===
- May 3 – Vyacheslav Molotov succeeds Maxim Litvinov, as Soviet Foreign Commissar.
- May 6 – German anti-Nazi Carl Friedrich Goerdeler tells the British government that the German and Soviet governments are secretly beginning a rapprochement, with the aim of dividing Eastern Europe between them. Goerdeler also informs the British of German economic problems which he states threaten the survival of the Nazi regime, and advises that if a firm stand is made for Poland, then Hitler will be deterred from war.
- May 9 – Spain leaves the League of Nations.
- May 14 – Lina Medina, a 5-year-old Peruvian girl, gives birth to a baby boy, becoming the youngest confirmed mother in medical history.
- May 17
  - King George VI and Queen Elizabeth of the United Kingdom arrive in Quebec City, to begin the first-ever tour of Canada by Canada's monarch.
  - The British government issues the White Paper of 1939, sharply restricting Jewish immigration to Mandatory Palestine.
  - Sweden, Norway, and Finland refuse Germany's offer of non-aggression pacts.
- May 18 – The Hòa Hảo religious sect is established in Vietnam, by Huỳnh Phú Sổ.
- May 20 – Pan American Airways begins transatlantic mail service with the inaugural flight of its Boeing 314 flying boat Yankee Clipper from Port Washington, New York, to Marseille.
- May 22 – Germany and Italy sign the Pact of Steel.
- May 23 – The White Paper of 1939 is ratified by the British government, acting as the governing policy for Mandatory Palestine from 1939 to 1948.
- May 24 – The first issue of Fashizmi is published in Tirana, Albania.
- May 29 – Albanian fascist leader Tefik Mborja is appointed as member of the Italian Chamber of Fasces and Corporations.

=== June ===
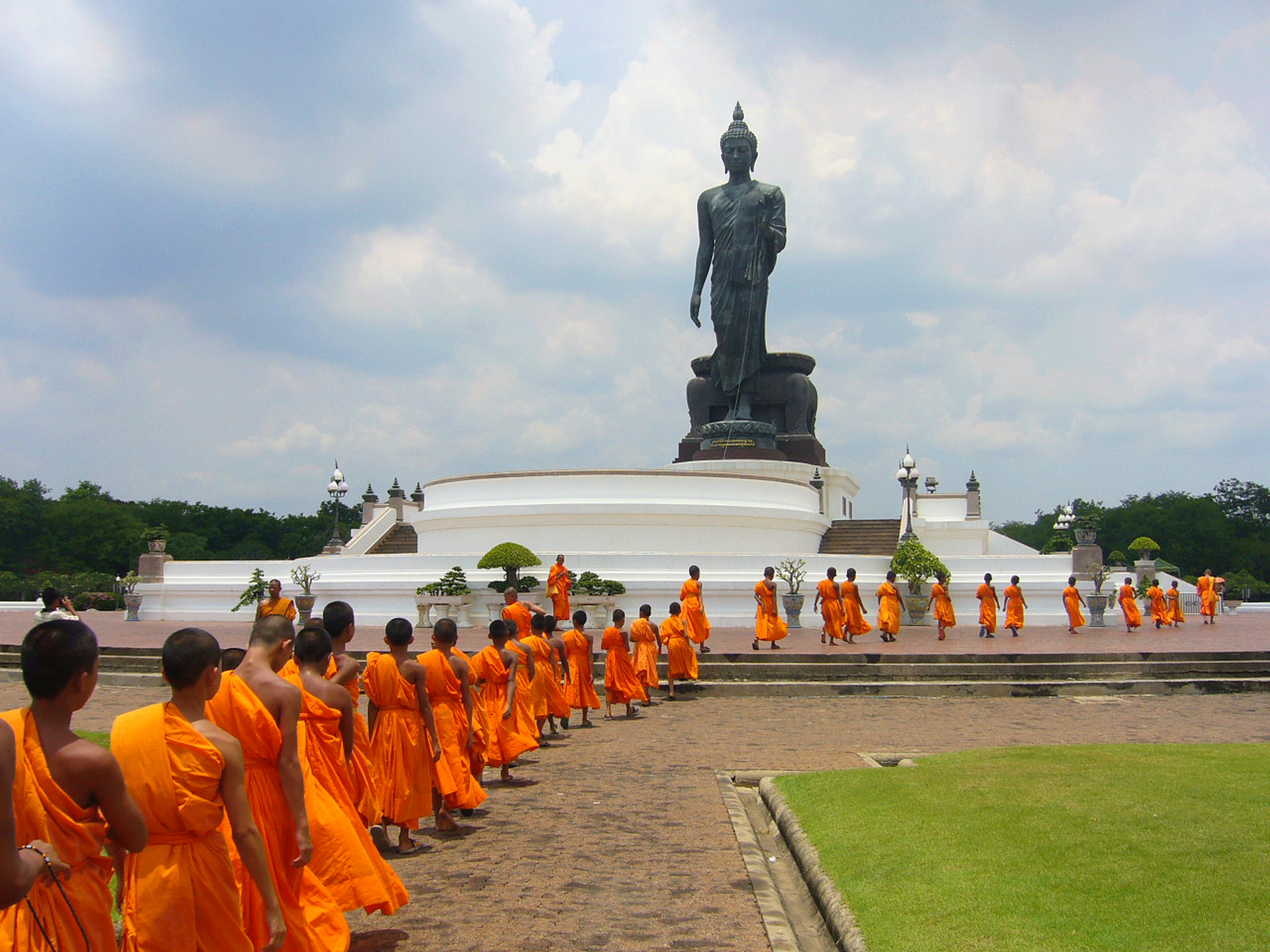
June 24: Siam is renamed "Thailand".

- June 3 – The Soviet government offers its definition of what constitutes "aggression", upon which the projected Anglo-Soviet-French alliance will come into effect. French Foreign Minister Georges Bonnet accepts the Soviet definition of aggression at once. The British reject the Soviet definition, especially the concept of "indirect aggression", which they feel is too loose a definition, and phrased in such a manner as to imply the Soviet right of inference in the internal affairs of Eastern European nations.
- June 4 – The St. Louis, a ship carrying 907 Jewish refugees, is denied permission to land in Florida; only a few passengers have been allowed to enter Cuba. Forced to return to Europe, many of its passengers later die in Nazi death camps during The Holocaust.
- June 14 – Tientsin Incident: The Japanese blockade the British concession in Tianjin, China, beginning a crisis which almost causes an Anglo-Japanese war this summer.
- June 17 – In the last public execution in France, 6-times murderer Eugen Weidmann is guillotined.
- June 23 – Talks are completed in Ankara between French Ambassador René Massigli and Turkish Foreign Minister Şükrü Saracoğlu, resolving the Hatay dispute in Turkey's favor. Turkey annexes Hatay.
- June 24 – The government of Siam changes the country's name to Thailand, which means 'Free Land'.

=== July ===
- July 4 - President Roosevelt asked the Senate to reverse the House action to forbid shipment of arms and munitions to nations at war.
- July 6 – The last remaining Jewish enterprises in Germany are closed by the Nazis.
- July 8 – The Pan American Airways Boeing 314 flying boat Yankee Clipper inaugurates the world's first heavier-than-air North Atlantic air passenger service, between the United States (Port Washington, New York) and Britain.
- July 23 – Mahatma Gandhi writes a personal letter to Adolf Hitler from India, addressing him as "My friend", requesting him to prevent any possible war.

=== August ===
- August 2 – The Einstein–Szilard letter is signed by Albert Einstein, advising President of the United States Franklin D. Roosevelt of the potential use of uranium to construct an atomic bomb. It is delivered on October 11 and leads to the first meeting on October 21 of the Advisory Committee on Uranium.
- August 4 – Prime Minister Neville Chamberlain dismisses the Parliament of the United Kingdom until October 3.
- August 19 – Adolf Hitler, after evaluating the pace of non-aggression negotiations with the Soviet Union, orders the Kriegsmarine to begin the opening operations for Fall Weiß, the invasion of Poland. The German pocket battleship Admiral Graf Spee, along with the German pocket battleship Deutschland, as well as dozens of U-boats, cast off for their advance positions. Hitler spends the next few days worrying that the Russians will not come to terms in time for the rest of the invasion plans to unfold as scheduled.
- August 20 – Armored forces under the command of Soviet General Georgy Zhukov deliver a decisive defeat to Imperial Japanese Army forces in the Japanese-Soviet border war in Inner Mongolia.
- August 23 – The Molotov–Ribbentrop Pact is signed between Germany and the Soviet Union, a neutrality treaty that also agrees to division of spheres of influence (Finland, Estonia, Latvia, eastern Poland and Bessarabia (modern-day Moldova), north-east province of Romania to the Soviet Union; Lithuania and western Poland to Germany). Its annex reassigns Lithuania to the Soviet Union.
- August 24 – As details of the Molotov–Ribbentrop Pact become public, British Prime Minister Neville Chamberlain recalls the Parliament of the United Kingdom several weeks early. In a burst of legislation, the Emergency Powers (Defence) Act 1939 gives full authority to defence regulations, the British Royal Navy is to be put on a war footing, all military leave is to be cancelled, military reserve forces are to be called up, especially coast defence, radar and anti-aircraft units, and Civil Defence workers are placed on alert. In addition, the last British and French private citizens in Germany are advised to return home by their respective Governments.
- August 25
  - The German Foreign Ministry cuts off all telegraph and telephone communication with the outside world, in accordance with the plan for Fall Weiß. At approximately 1830 Central European time, Adolf Hitler postpones Fall Weiß for 5 days, after receiving a message from Benito Mussolini that he will not honor the Pact of Steel if Germany attacks Poland, and because Chamberlain's government has not fallen as a result of the German-Soviet Non-Aggression Pact. Some units already in their forward positions (the attack is scheduled for 0430 the next day) do not get the word in time and attack various targets along the border. This same day, Neville Chamberlain gives Edward Rydz-Śmigły his "ironclad guarantee" of assistance if Poland is attacked by Germany.
  - 1939 Coventry bombing: An Irish Republican Army bomb explodes in the centre of Coventry, England, killing 5 people.
- August 26
  - The first televised Major League Baseball games are shown on experimental station W2XBS in the United States: a double-header between the Cincinnati Reds and the Brooklyn Dodgers at Ebbets Field.
  - The Kriegsmarine orders all German-flagged merchant ships to head to German ports immediately, in anticipation of the invasion of Poland.
- August 27 – A Heinkel He 178, the first turbojet-powered aircraft, flies for the first time, with Captain Erich Warsitz in command.
- August 28 – French ocean liner SS Normandie heads into New York Harbor, where she will be interned on September 3, and cut up for scrap, beginning in 1946.
- August 30 – Poland begins a mobilization against Nazi Germany.
- August 31 – Operation Himmler: Nazi German troops posing as Poles stage a series of false flag operations on the border (including the Gleiwitz incident), giving a pretext for the invasion of Poland.

=== September ===
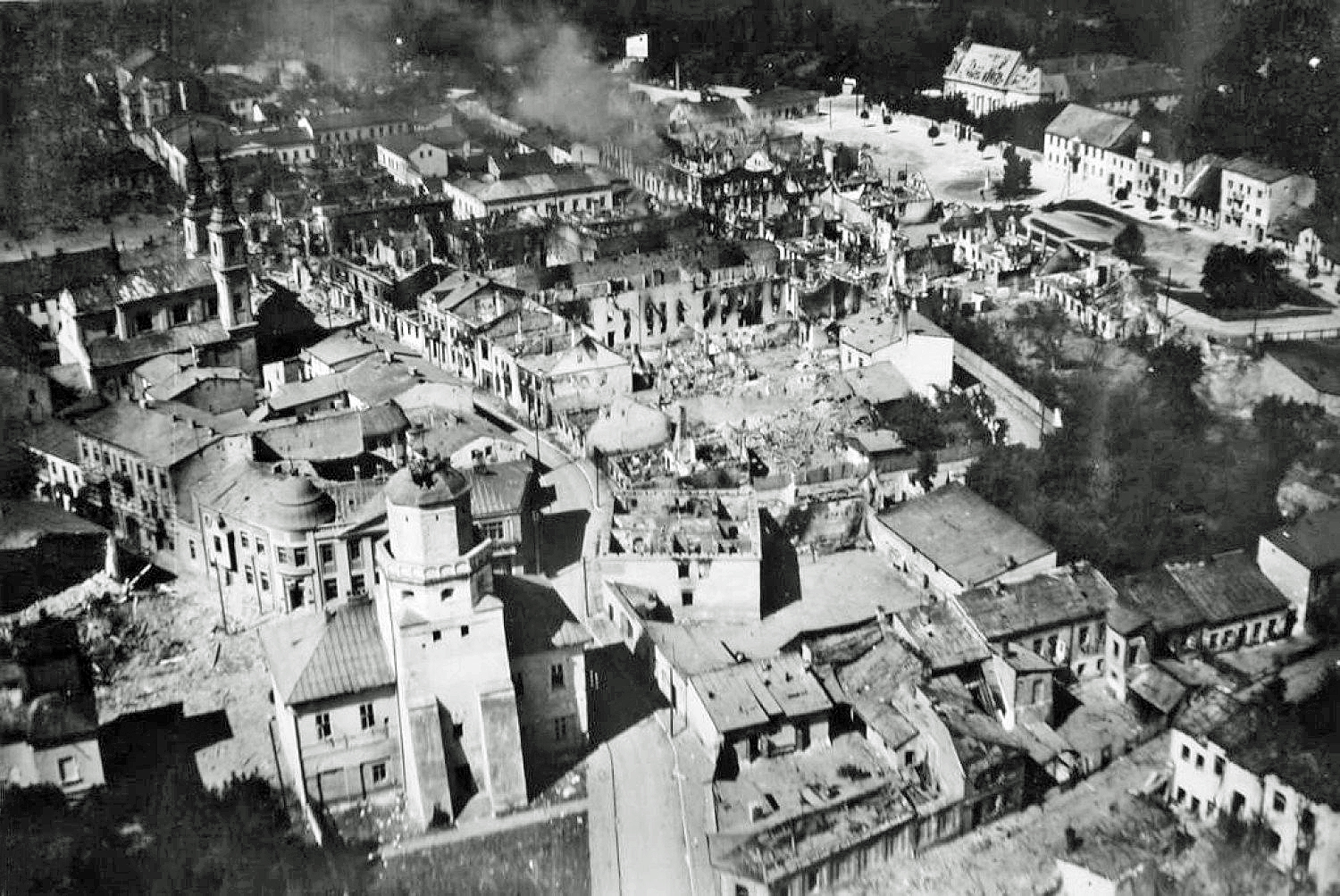
September 1: Wieluń destroyed by Luftwaffe bombing.

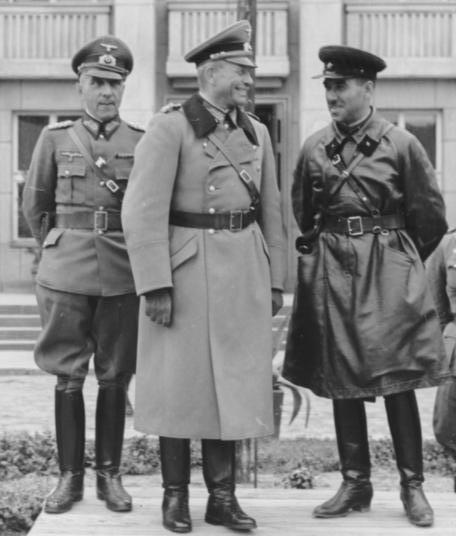
Common parade of Wehrmacht and Red Army in Brest at the end of the Invasion of Poland. At the center Major General Heinz Guderian and Brigadier Semyon Krivoshein.

- September 1 – Beginning of WWII:
  - Opening shots of World War II and invasion of Poland: At 4:45 Central European Time, under cover of darkness, the German WWI-era battleship Schleswig-Holstein quietly slips her moorings at her wharf in Danzig Harbor, drifts into the center of the channel, and commences firing on a Polish military installation on Westerplatte at the northeastern mouth of the port of the internationalized Free City of Danzig, beginning the Battle of Westerplatte and Battle of Danzig Bay. Polish soldiers defend there for 7 days. Five minutes previously, the bombing of Wieluń in the western part of Poland had commenced, beginning the Battle of the Border. Shock-troops of the German Wehrmacht begin crossing the border into Poland.
  - The Reichstag passes a statement, stating that Adolf Hitler's second-in-command Reichsmarschall Hermann Göring should be appointed as Hitler's successor as Führer, should Hitler die during the war. Rudolf Hess is to be appointed in Göring's place, should anything befall Göring.
  - Britain and France deliver ultimatums to Germany. Norway, Finland, Sweden and Switzerland declare their neutrality. U.S. President Franklin D. Roosevelt states that "every effort" would be made by his administration to stay out of the war. Italy is advised that Germany does not expect to need its military support at present.
- September 2 – WWII:
  - Following the invasion of Poland, the Free City of Danzig (modern-day Gdańsk, Poland) is annexed to Nazi Germany.
  - Spain and Ireland declare their neutrality.
- September 3 – WWII:
  - The United Kingdom, France, New Zealand, Australia and India (by its Viceroy) declare war on Nazi Germany. Prime Minister of Canada Mackenzie King, in English, and Justice Minister Ernest Lapointe, in French, give an international radio address stating the Dominion's intention to declare war also.
  - United States President Franklin D. Roosevelt advocates neutrality, in a nationwide radio address.
  - Ocean liner SS Athenia becomes the first British civilian casualty of the war, when she is torpedoed and sunk by German submarine U-30 in the eastern Atlantic. Of the 1,418 aboard, 98 passengers and 19 crew are killed.
  - Chamberlain offers the war cabinet post of First Lord of the Admiralty to Winston Churchill, who returns to government for the first time since June 4, 1929.
- September 4 – WWII:
  - The first bombing of Wilhelmshaven in World War II is carried out, by the British Royal Air Force (RAF).
  - The Defense of Katowice by irregular Polish militia fails and the city is secured by German Wehrmacht forces who carry out the Katowice massacre.
  - Nepal declares war on Germany.
- September 5 – WWII: The United States declares its neutrality in the war.
- September 6 – WWII: South Africa declares war on Germany.
- September 8
  - WWII: Forward elements of General Hoeppner's XVI Panzerkorps take up positions outside Warsaw. The world is stunned by the rapidity of the German advance, and the Polish High Command is effectively isolated, but lack of infantry support and effective civilian resistance cause Hoeppner to halt outside the city itself.
  - WWII: Battle of Westerplatte ends when Polish troops on the Westerplatte are forced by lack of food and ammunition to surrender. The garrison of about two hundred had held out against thousands of German forces (many of them naval officer cadets from the Schleswig-Holstein) for seven days.
  - The Little Sisters of Jesus is founded in Algeria, by Little Sister Magdeleine.

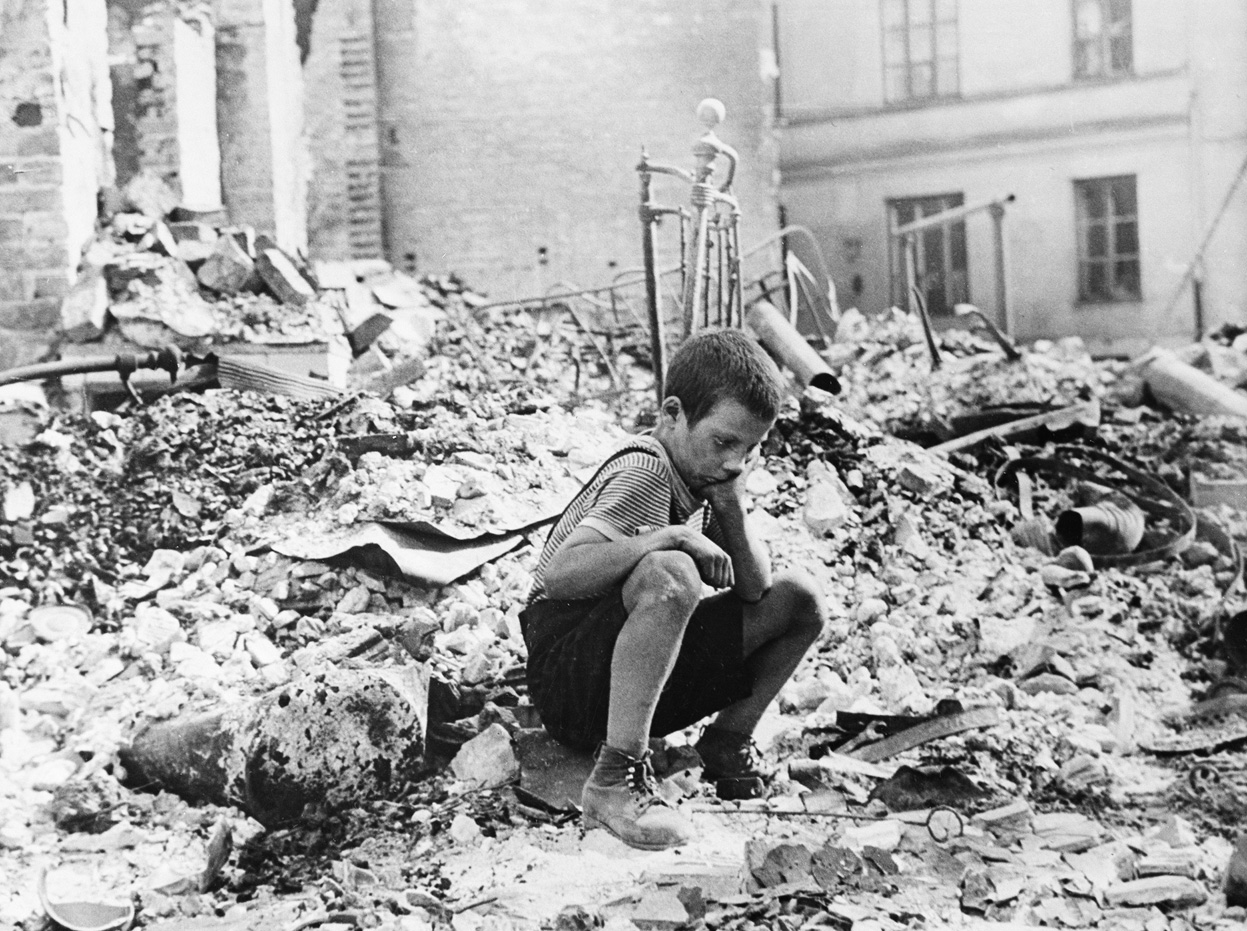
September: Siege of Warsaw.

- September 9 – WWII: Troops of the Polish Poznań Army under the command of General Kutrzeba open the Battle of the Bzura, the largest and best organized counter-attack mounted by the Polish forces in the campaign of 1939. For the first few days all goes well, and the Germans are forced to retreat; but quick reaction by mechanized units and the Luftwaffe soon take their toll, and the operation bogs down.
- September 10 – WWII: Canadian declaration of war on Germany.
- September 13–14 – WWII: Zambrów massacre – German Wehrmacht soldiers shoot more than 200 Polish prisoners of war.
- September 15 – WWII: Diverse elements of the German Wehrmacht surround Warsaw, and demand its surrender. The Poles refuse, and the siege begins in earnest.
- September 16 – A ceasefire ends the Battles of Khalkhin Gol, the undeclared border war between the Soviet Union (and Mongolian allies) and Japan.
- September 17 – WWII:
  - The Soviet Union invades Poland, and then occupies eastern Polish territories.
  - Royal Navy aircraft carrier HMS Courageous is torpedoed and sunk by German submarine U-29 in the Western Approaches with the loss of 519 crew (the first British warship loss of the war).
- September 18 – WWII: Orzeł incident: Polish submarine ORP Orzeł escapes internment from Tallinn Harbour, Estonia, leading both the Soviet Union and Germany to question Estonia's neutrality.
- September 19 – WWII: The Poznan pocket collapses, and the Germans capture, according to many sources, over 150,000 men. Many elements of General Tadeusz Kutrzeba's forces work their way into Warsaw, under extreme difficulty.
- September 21
  - Reinhard Heydrich, chief of the Security Police, sends a directive, the Schnellbrief, explaining that Jews living in towns and villages in the Polish occupation zones are to be transferred to ghettos, and Jewish councils, Judenräte, will be established to carry out the German authorities' orders.
  - Assassination of Armand Călinescu: Prime Minister of Romania Armand Călinescu is shot in Bucharest by members of the fascist Iron Guard.
- September 22 – WWII: A joint victory parade is staged by the Wehrmacht and Red Army in Brest-Litovsk, at the end of the Invasion of Poland.
- September 24 – WWII: The Soviet Union issues an ultimatum to Estonia to allow Soviet military bases on its territory, which Estonia accepts on September 28. Similar ultimatums are issued to Latvia on October 5 and to Lithuania on October 10, who are forced to accept them as well.
- September 28 – WWII:
  - Nazi Germany and the Soviet Union agree on a division of Poland, after their invasion.
  - Warsaw surrenders to Germany; Modlin surrenders a day later; the last Polish large operational unit surrenders near Kock 8 days later.
- September 30 – General Władysław Sikorski becomes Prime Minister of the Polish government-in-exile.

=== October ===
- October 6 – WWII: The Battle of Kock ends the Polish Campaign. Polish resistance moves underground.
- October 7 – WWII: British Royal Navy cruiser HMS Emerald departs Plymouth in convoy for Halifax, Nova Scotia, carrying £2M in gold bar to be used for purchase of military materiel in North America, a predecessor of Operation Fish.
- October 8
  - WWII: Germany annexes Western Poland.
  - The Holocaust: Piotrków Trybunalski Ghetto, the first Jewish ghetto in Nazi-occupied Europe, is proclaimed in German-occupied Poland.
- October 14 – German submarine U-47 sinks the British battleship HMS Royal Oak at anchor in Scapa Flow (Scotland), with the loss of 833 crew.

=== November ===
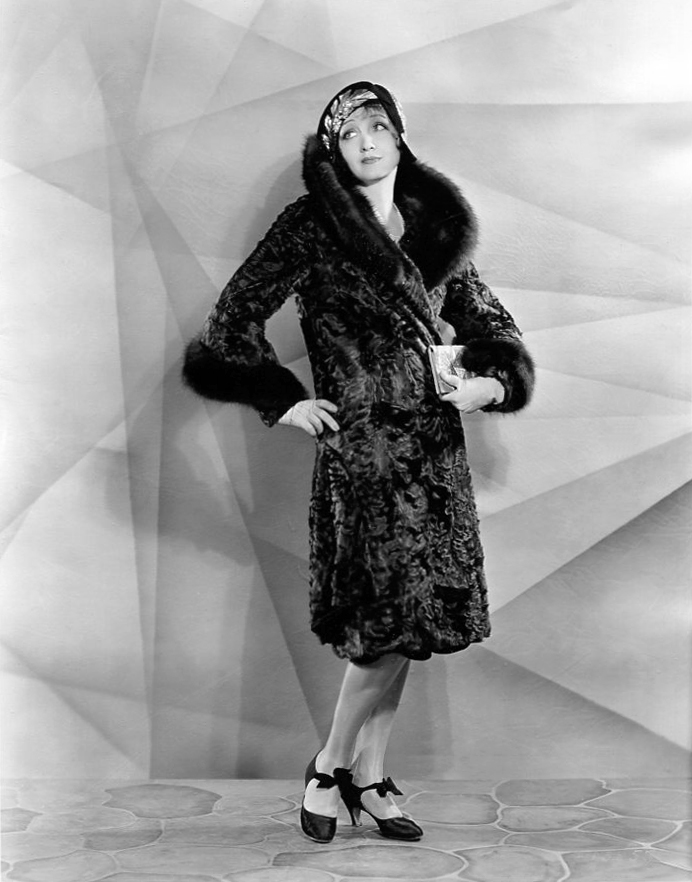
November 6: Hedda Hopper

- November 1–2 – WWII: Physicist Hans Ferdinand Mayer writes the Oslo Report on German weapons systems, and passes it to the British Secret Intelligence Service.
- November 4 – WWII: U.S. President Franklin D. Roosevelt orders the United States Customs Service to implement the Neutrality Act of 1939, allowing cash-and-carry purchases of weapons to non-belligerent nations.
- November 4 – Stewart Menzies is appointed head of the British Secret Intelligence Service.
- November 6
  - Hedda Hopper's Hollywood debuts on radio in the United States with gossip columnist Hedda Hopper as host (the show runs until 1951, making Hopper a powerful figure among the Hollywood elite).
  - WWII: Sonderaktion Krakau – Germans take action against scientists from the University of Kraków, and other Kraków universities.
- November 8
  - WWII: In Munich, an attempt to kill Adolf Hitler is made by Georg Elser while Hitler is celebrating the 16th anniversary of the Beer Hall Putsch.
  - CBS television station W2XAB resumes test transmission, with an all-electronic system broadcast from the top of the Chrysler Building in New York City.
- November 9 – WWII: Venlo Incident: Two British agents of SIS are captured by the Germans.
- November 14 – In Washington, D.C., U.S. President Franklin D. Roosevelt lays the cornerstone of the Jefferson Memorial.
- November 16 – Al Capone is released from Terminal Island, due to deteriorating health caused by syphilis.
- November 17 – WWII: To punish protests against the Nazi occupation of the Czech homeland, the Nazis storm the University of Prague and murder 9 Czech graduate students, send over 1,200 to concentration camps, and close all Czech universities, an event which will be commemorated as International Students' Day.
- November 23 – WWII: British armed merchantman HMS Rawalpindi is sunk in the GIUK gap, in an action against the German battleships Scharnhorst and Gneisenau.
- November 26 – Shelling of Mainila: The Soviet Union's Red Army shells the Russian village of Mainila, then claims that the fire originated from Finland, giving a casus belli for the Winter War.
- November 30 – WWII: Winter War – Soviet forces attack Finland and reach the Mannerheim Line, starting the war. Sweden declares itself a non-belligerent in the Winter War.

=== December ===
- December 1 – The Soviet Union establishes the Finnish Democratic Republic puppet state in Terijoki.
- December 4 – WWII:
  - British battleship HMS Nelson strikes a mine (laid by U-31) off the coast of Scotland, and is laid up for repairs until August 1940.
  - German submarine U-36 is torpedoed and sunk by British submarine HMS Salmon off Stavanger, the first enemy submarine lost to a British one during the war.
- December 6 – WWII: Winter War – The Red Army's advance on the Karelian Isthmus is stopped by Finns at the Mannerheim Line during the Battle of Taipale.
- December 9 – WWII: The first soldier of the British Expeditionary Force is killed: Corporal Thomas Priday triggers a French land mine.
- December 12 – WWII: HMS Duchess sinks after a collision with HMS Barham off the coast of Scotland, with the loss of 124 men.
- December 13 – WWII – Battle of the River Plate: The German heavy cruiser Admiral Graf Spee is trapped by cruisers HMS Ajax, HMNZS Achilles, and HMS Exeter after a running battle off the coast of Uruguay. Graf Spee is scuttled by its crew off Montevideo Harbor, on December 17.
- December 14 – WWII: Winter War – The League of Nations expels the USSR for attacking Finland.
- December 15 – Gone with the Wind premieres at Loew's Grand Theatre in Atlanta. Based on Margaret Mitchell's best-selling novel of 1936, it is the longest American film made up to this date (at nearly four hours) and rapidly becomes the highest-grossing film up to this time.
- December 18 – WWII: Battle of the Heligoland Bight – RAF Bomber Command, on a daylight mission to attack Kriegsmarine ships in the Heligoland Bight, is repulsed by Luftwaffe fighter aircraft.
- December 26 – Miners strike in Borinage, Belgium.
- December 27 – The 7.8 M_{w} Erzincan earthquake shakes eastern Turkey with a maximum Mercalli intensity of XII (Extreme), causing $20 million in damage, and leaving 32,700–32,968 dead.

=== Date unknown ===
- Kirlian photography is invented by Semyon Kirlian.
- Enzo Ferrari founds Auto Avio Construzioni, the company that becomes Ferrari in 1947.

== Births ==
=== January–February ===
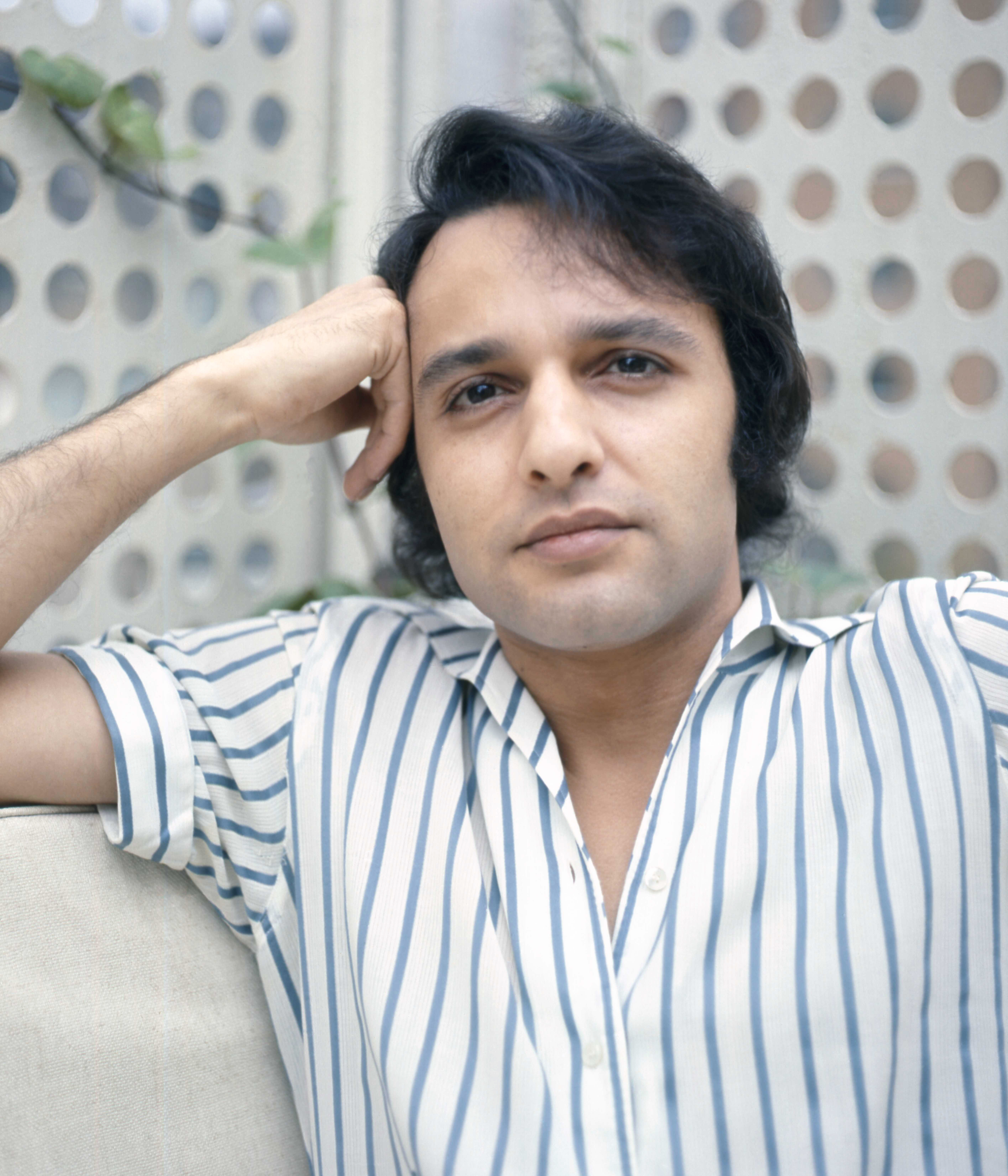
Sal Mineo

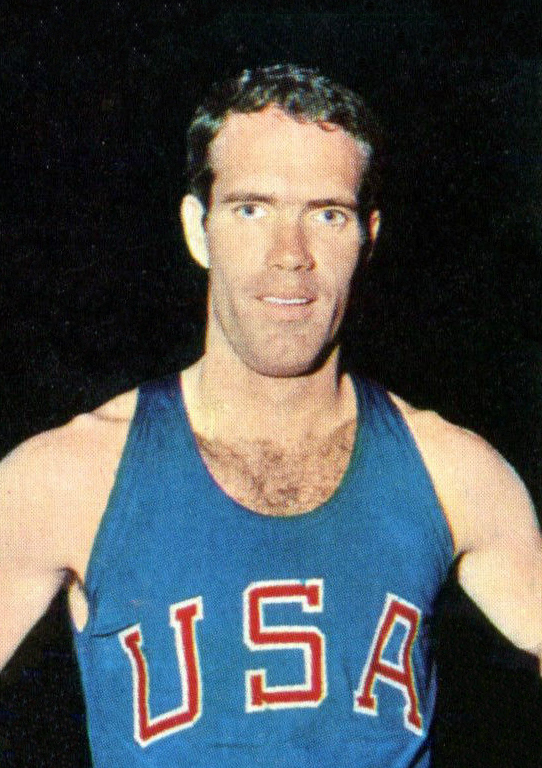
Bill Toomey

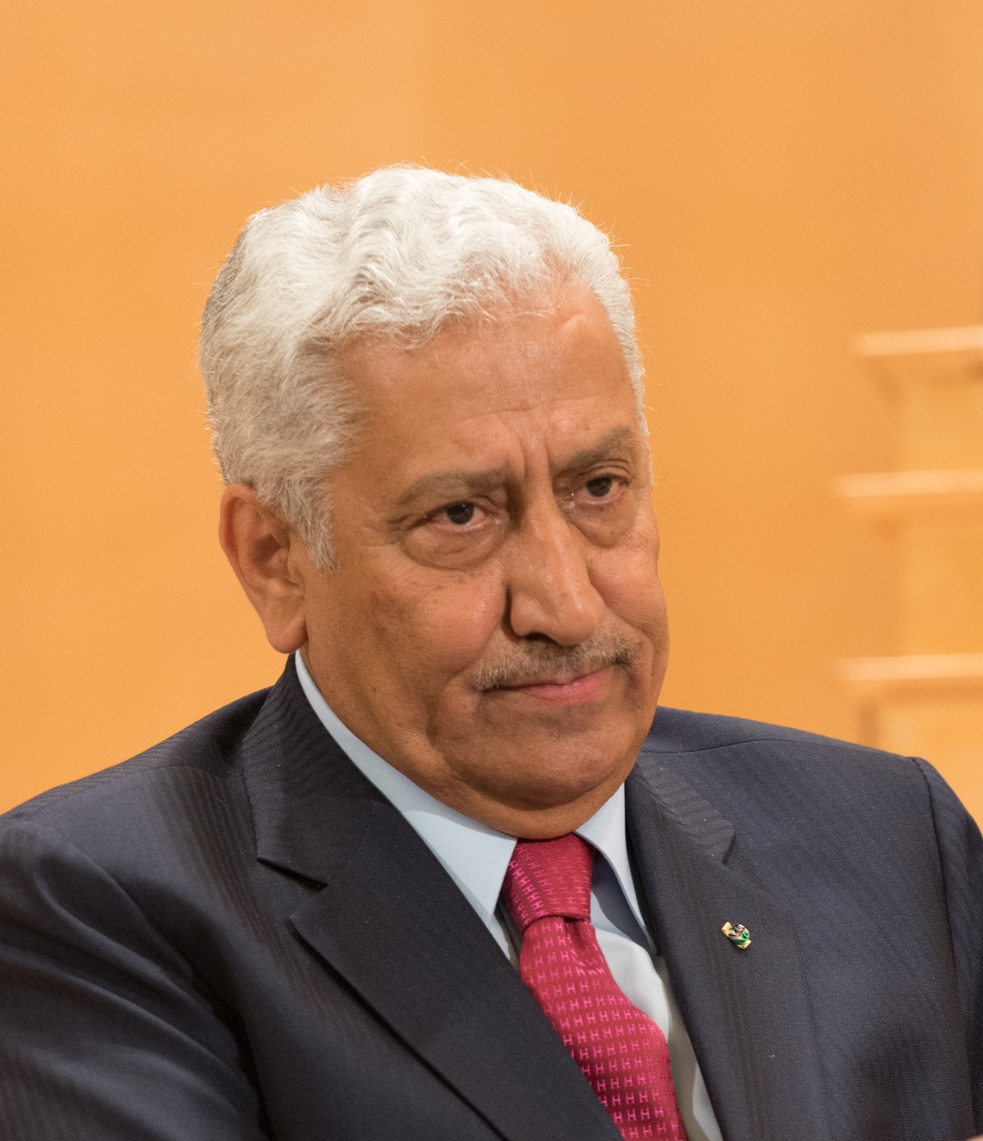
Abdullah Ensour

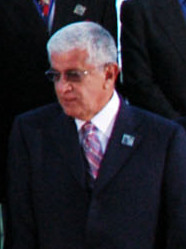
Alfredo Palacio

- January 1 – Ali Mahdi Muhammad, Somali entrepreneur, politician and 4th President of Somalia (d. 2021)
- January 3
  - Arik Einstein, Israeli singer (d. 2013)
  - Bobby Hull, Canadian ice hockey player (d. 2023)
  - Vincent Siew, Taiwanese politician, 9th Vice President of the Republic of China
- January 6
  - Valeriy Lobanovskyi, Ukrainian footballer, manager (d. 2002)
  - Murray Rose, Australian swimmer (d. 2012)
- January 7 – Prince Michael of Greece and Denmark, Italian-born Greek prince and historical biographer (d. 2024)
- January 9 – Susannah York, British actress (d. 2011)
- January 10
  - Sal Mineo, American actor (d. 1976)
  - Bill Toomey, American athlete
- January 11 – Anne Heggtveit, Canadian skier
- January 12 – Joachim Yhombi-Opango, Congolese politician (d. 2020)
- January 17 – Maury Povich, American talk show host
- January 19 – Phil Everly, American rock 'n' roll musician, member of Rockabilly Hall of Fame (d. 2014)
- January 20 – Chandra Wickramasinghe, British astronomer and poet
- January 22
  - Sonny Chiba, Japanese actor and martial artist (d. 2021)
  - Alfredo Palacio, 42nd President of Ecuador (d. 2025)
- January 24 – Ray Stevens, American musician ("Everything is Beautiful")
- January 29 – Germaine Greer, Australian feminist writer
- February 1 – Ekaterina Maximova, Russian ballerina (d. 2009)
- February 3
  - Michael Cimino, American film director (d. 2016)
  - R. C. Sproul, American Reformed theologian, author and pastor, founder of Ligonier Ministries (d. 2017)
- February 7 – Francisco Mendes, Guinea-Bissau politician, 1st Prime Minister of Guinea-Bissau (d. 1978)
- February 8 – Egon Zimmermann, Austrian Olympic alpine skier (d. 2019)
- February 10
  - Adrienne Clarkson, 26th Governor General of Canada
  - Tsuyoshi Yamanaka, Japanese freestyle swimmer (d. 2017)
- February 12 – Ray Manzarek, American keyboardist (The Doors) (d. 2013)
- February 13 – Andrew Peacock, Australian politician (d. 2021)
- February 15 – Robert Hansen, American serial killer (d. 2014)
- February 18 – Abdelraouf Al-Rawabdeh, Jordanian political figure, 65th Prime Minister of Jordan
- February 19 – Erin Pizzey, British author, founder of the first domestic violence shelter in the modern world
- February 28 – Daniel C. Tsui, Chinese-born physicist, Nobel Prize laureate

=== March–April ===
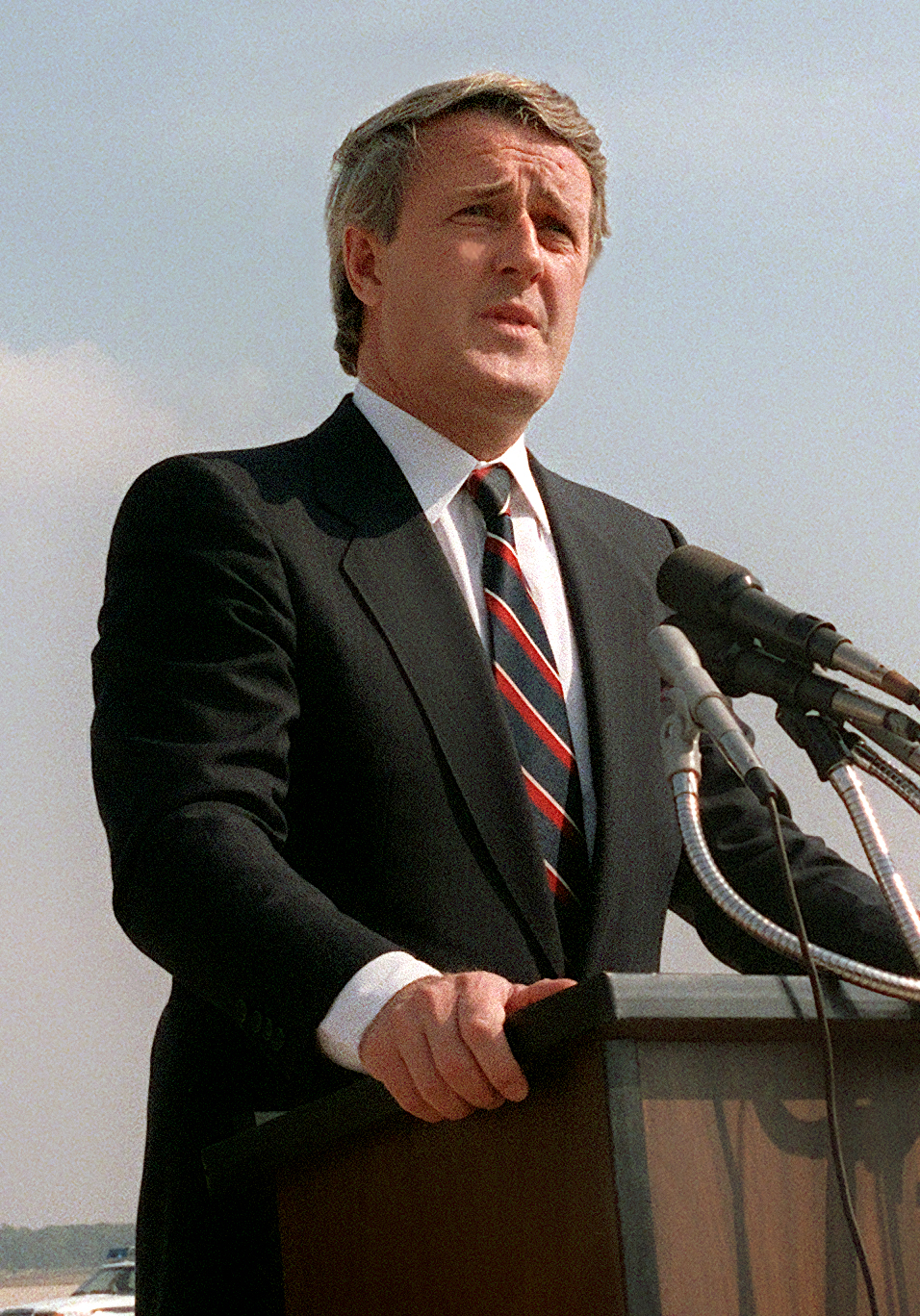
Brian Mulroney

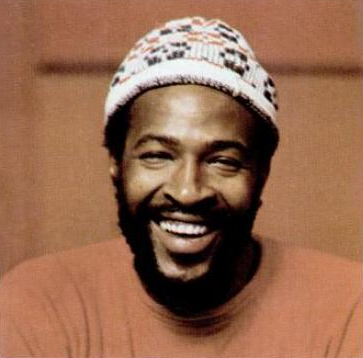
Marvin Gaye

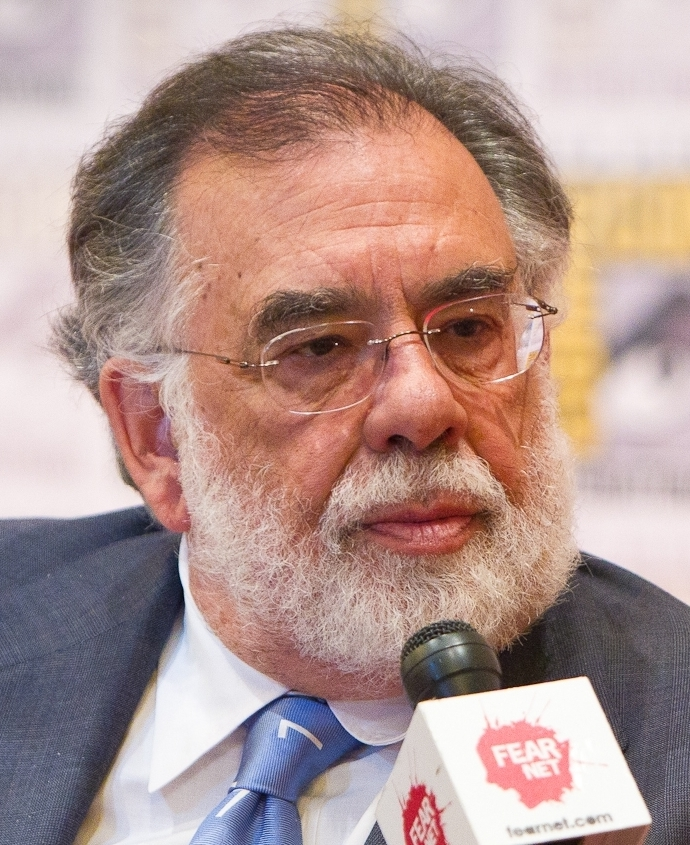
Francis Ford Coppola

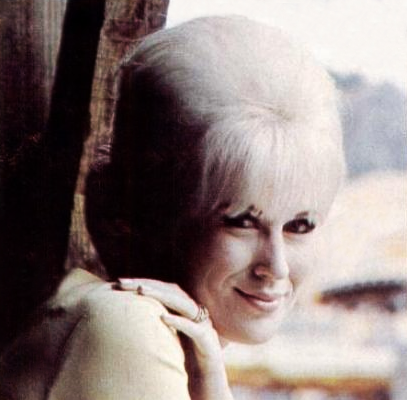
Dusty Springfield

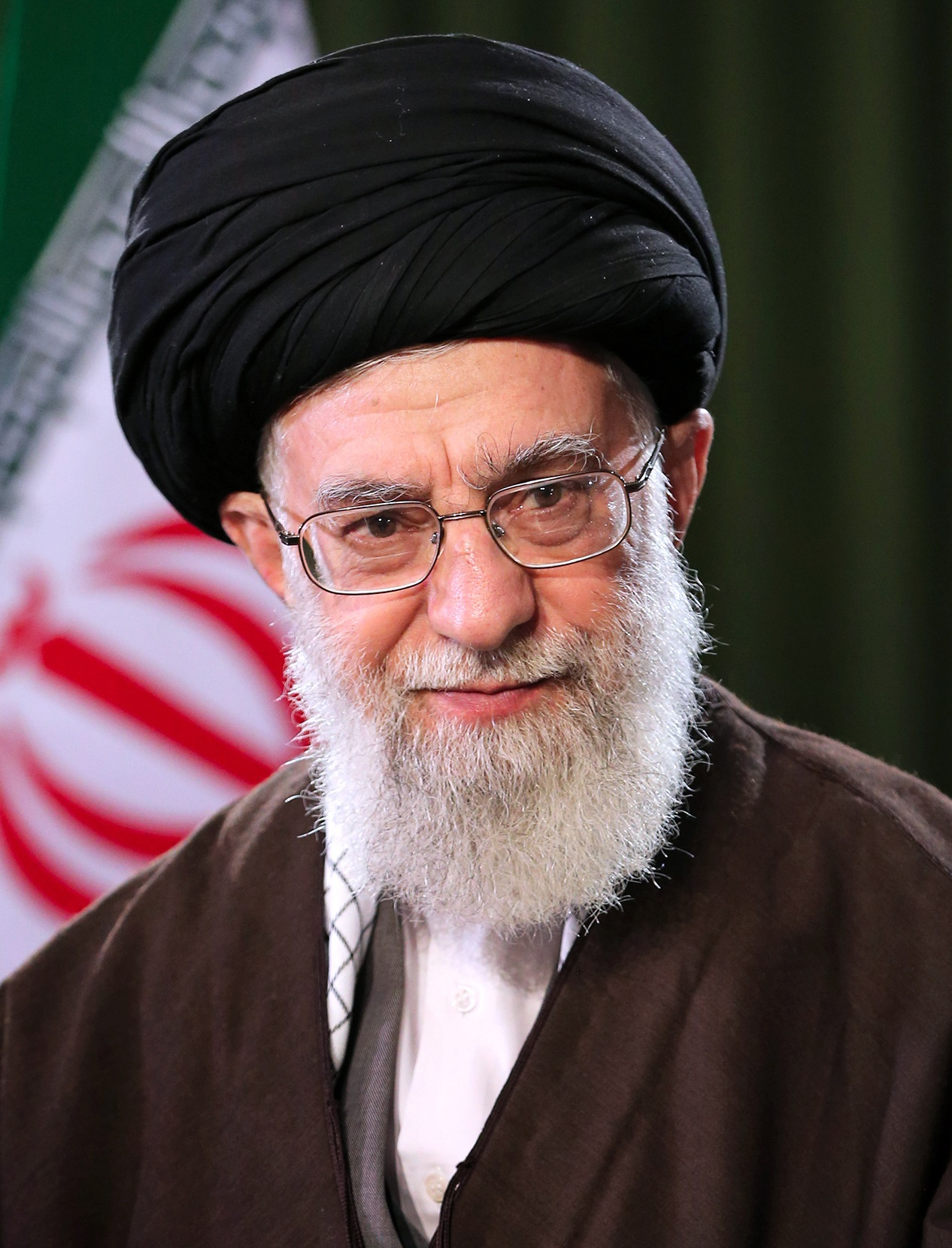
Ali Khamenei

- March 1 – Tzvetan Todorov, Bulgarian-French historian, philosopher, structuralist literary critic, sociologist and essayist (d. 2017)
- March 2 – Takako, Princess Suga
- March 5
  - Samantha Eggar, English actress (d. 2025)
  - Chögyam Trungpa, Buddhist meditation master (d. 1987)
- March 8 – Lidiya Skoblikova, Russian speed-skater
- March 10 – Lee Soo-sung, 27th Prime Minister of South Korea
- March 13 – Neil Sedaka, American singer-songwriter (d. 2026)
- March 14 – Glauber Rocha, Brazilian film director, actor and screenwriter (d. 1981)
- March 17 – Giovanni Trapattoni, Italian footballer and manager
- March 20
  - Thanmanpillai Kanagasabai, Sri Lankan politician, MP (2004–2010) (d. 2025)
  - Brian Mulroney, 18th Prime Minister of Canada (d. 2024)
- March 25 – D. C. Fontana, American television writer (d. 2019)
- March 29 – Terence Hill, Italian actor
- March 31
  - Zviad Gamsakhurdia, President of Georgia (d. 1993)
  - Volker Schlöndorff, German film director
  - Karl-Heinz Schnellinger, German footballer (d. 2024)
- April 1 – Ali MacGraw, American actress
- April 2 – Marvin Gaye, American singer (d. 1984)
- April 4
  - Hugh Masekela, South African trumpeter, flugelhornist, cornetist, composer and singer (d. 2018)
  - Ernie Terrell, African-American professional boxer (d. 2014)
- April 7
  - Sir David Frost, English television personality (d. 2013)
  - Francis Ford Coppola, American film director
- April 10 – Claudio Magris, Italian author
- April 12 – Alan Ayckbourn, English dramatist
- April 13 – Seamus Heaney, Irish poet, Nobel Prize laureate (d. 2013)
- April 15 – Jaime Paz Zamora, 60th President of Bolivia
- April 16 – Dusty Springfield, English pop singer (d. 1999)
- April 19 – Ali Khamenei, Supreme Leader of Iran (d. 2026)
- April 20 – Gro Harlem Brundtland, Norwegian politician, 1st female Prime Minister
- April 23 – Lee Majors, American actor
- April 27 – João Bernardo Vieira, President of Guinea-Bissau (d. 2009)

=== May–June ===
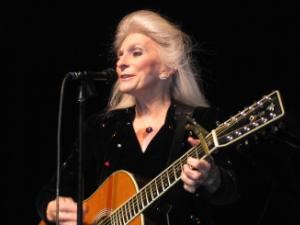
Judy Collins

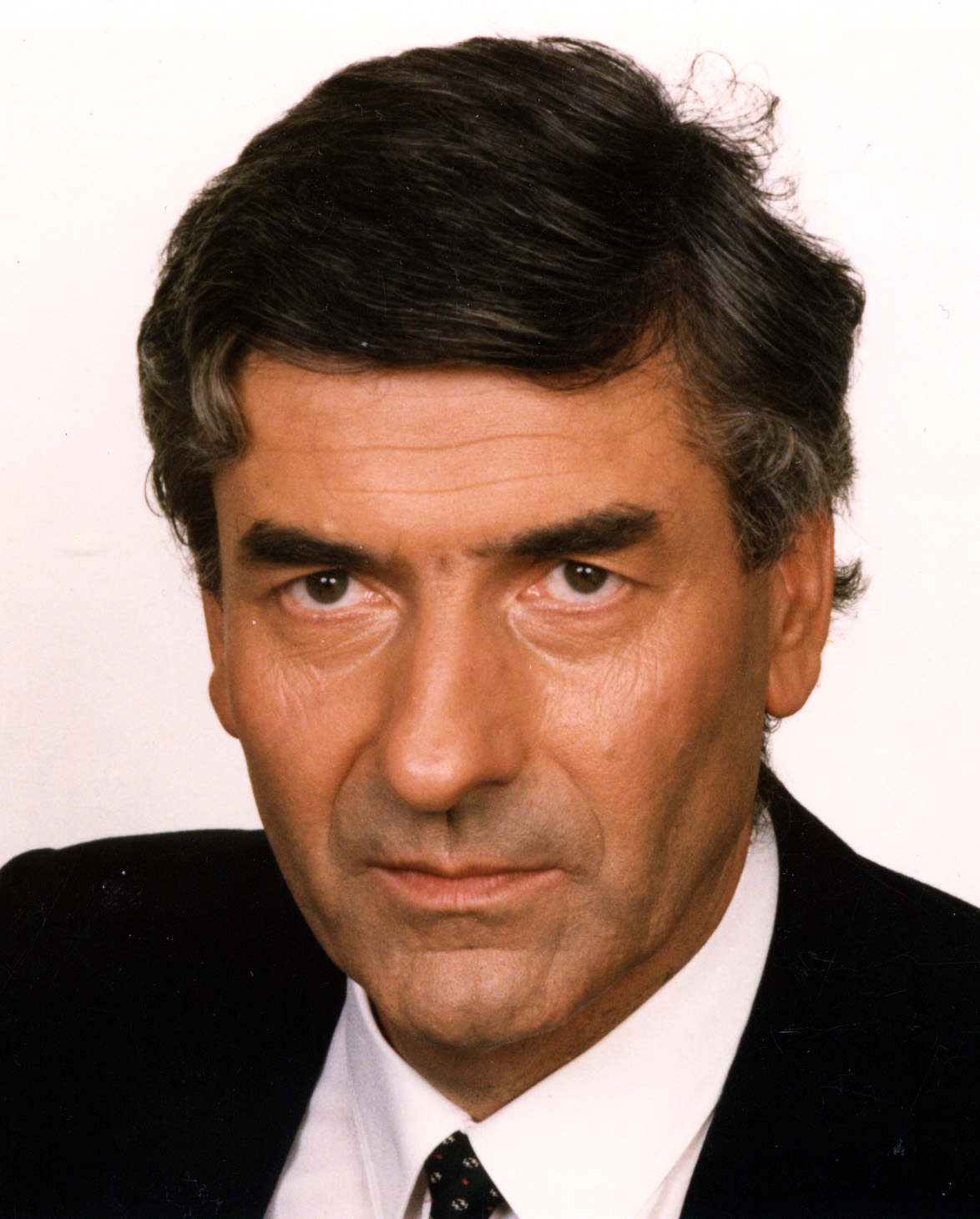
Ruud Lubbers

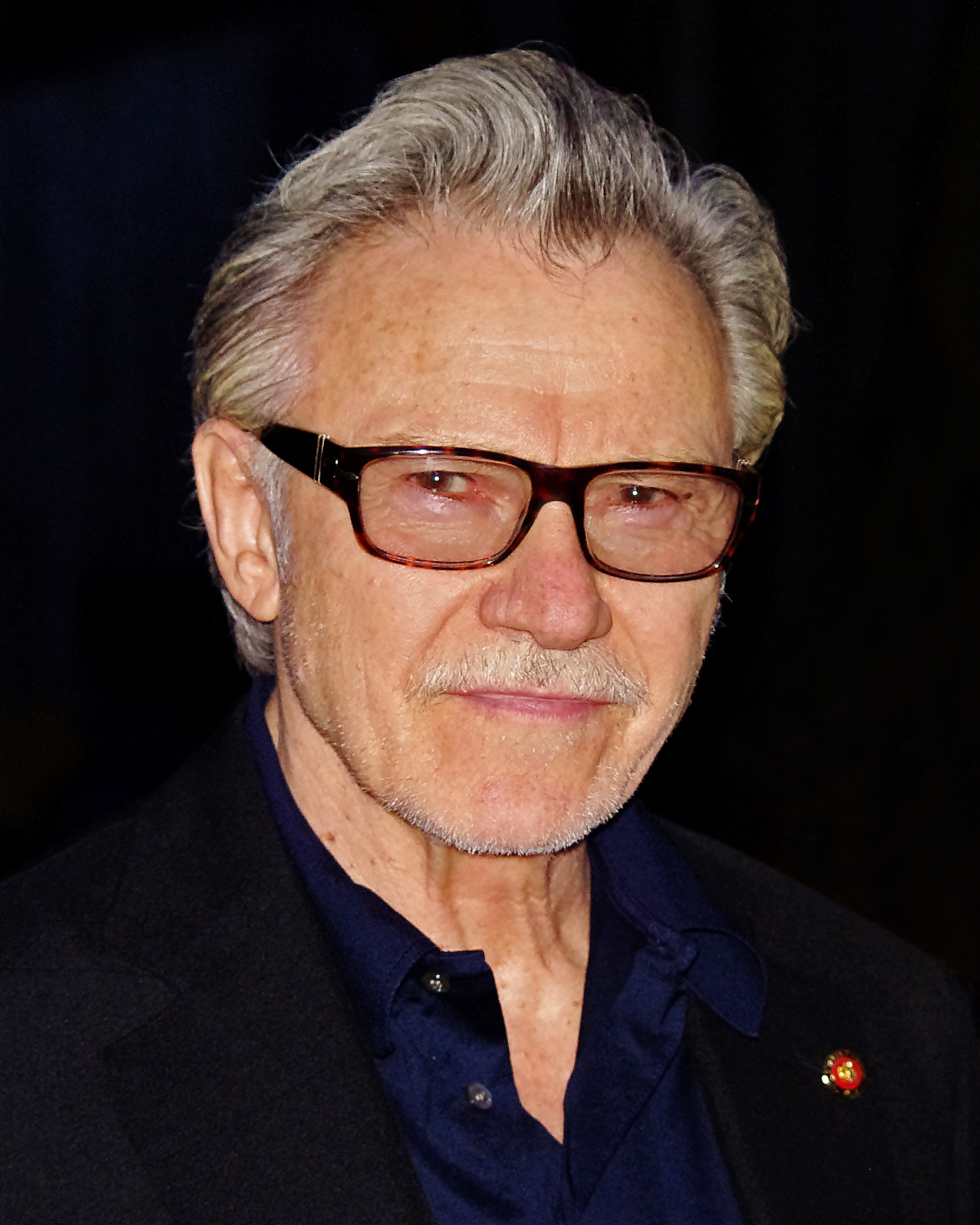
Harvey Keitel

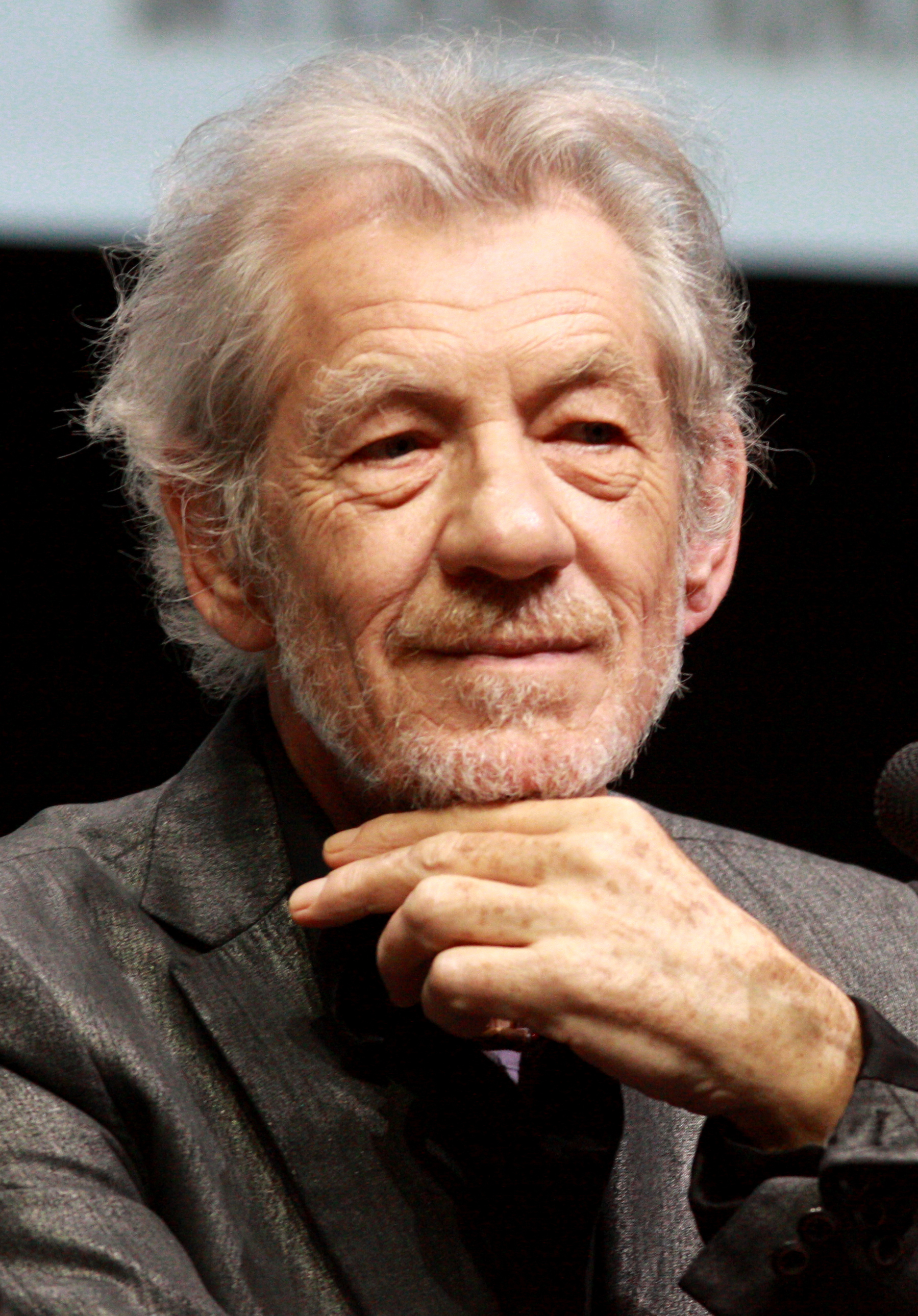
Sir Ian McKellen

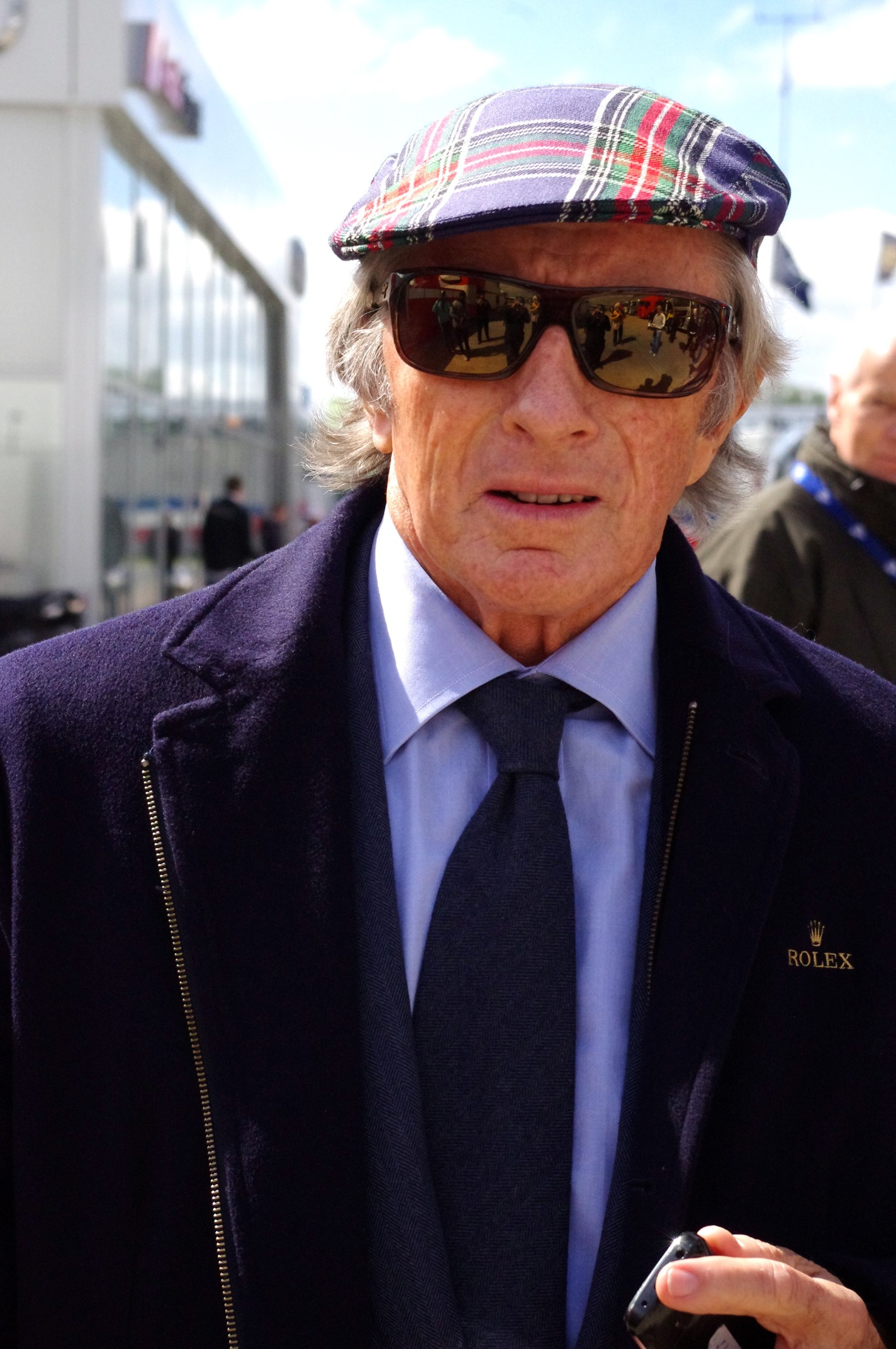
Jackie Stewart

- May 1 – Judy Collins, American singer-songwriter
- May 2
  - Sumio Iijima, Japanese physicist and inventor
  - Taomati Iuta, Vice President of Kiribati (1991–94) (d. 2016)
- May 4 – Amos Oz, Israeli author and journalist (d. 2018)
- May 7
  - José Antonio Abreu, Venezuelan orchestral conductor, music educator (d. 2018)
  - Sidney Altman, Canadian-born chemist, Nobel Prize laureate (d. 2022)
  - Ruud Lubbers, Dutch politician, Prime Minister of the Netherlands (1982–94) (d. 2018)
- May 9 – Ralph Boston, American athlete (d. 2023)
- May 13 – Harvey Keitel, American actor
- May 18 – Peter Grünberg, German physicist, Nobel Prize laureate (d. 2018)
- May 19
  - Livio Berruti, Italian sprinter (d. 2026)
  - James Fox, English actor
  - Nancy Kwan, American actress
  - Dick Scobee, American astronaut (d. 1986)
- May 20 – Roman Kartsev, Russian actor (d. 2018)
- May 21 – Heinz Holliger, Swiss oboist, composer
- May 22 – Paul Winfield, African-American actor (d. 2004)
- May 25
  - Dixie Carter, American actress (d. 2010)
  - Sir Ian McKellen, English actor
- May 27 – Don Williams, American musician (d. 2017)
- May 29 – Maeve Binchy, Irish author (d. 2012)
- May 30 – Michael J. Pollard, American actor (d. 2019)
- June 5
  - Joe Clark, 16th Prime Minister of Canada
  - Margaret Drabble, English novelist
- June 6 – Louis Andriessen, Dutch composer (d. 2021)
- June 9 – Ileana Cotrubaș, Romanian soprano (d. 2026)
- June 11 – Jackie Stewart, Scottish motor racing driver
- June 16 – Billy "Crash" Craddock, American country and rockabilly singer
- June 21 – Charles Jencks, American cultural theorist (d. 2019)
- June 22 – Ada Yonath, Israeli crystallographer (d. 2026)
- June 24 – Judy Olson Duhamel, American politician and educator
- June 26 – Osvaldo Hurtado, 34th President of Ecuador
- June 29 – Sante Gaiardoni, Italian cyclist (d. 2023)
- June 30 – Renzo Rovatti, Italian footballer

=== July–August ===
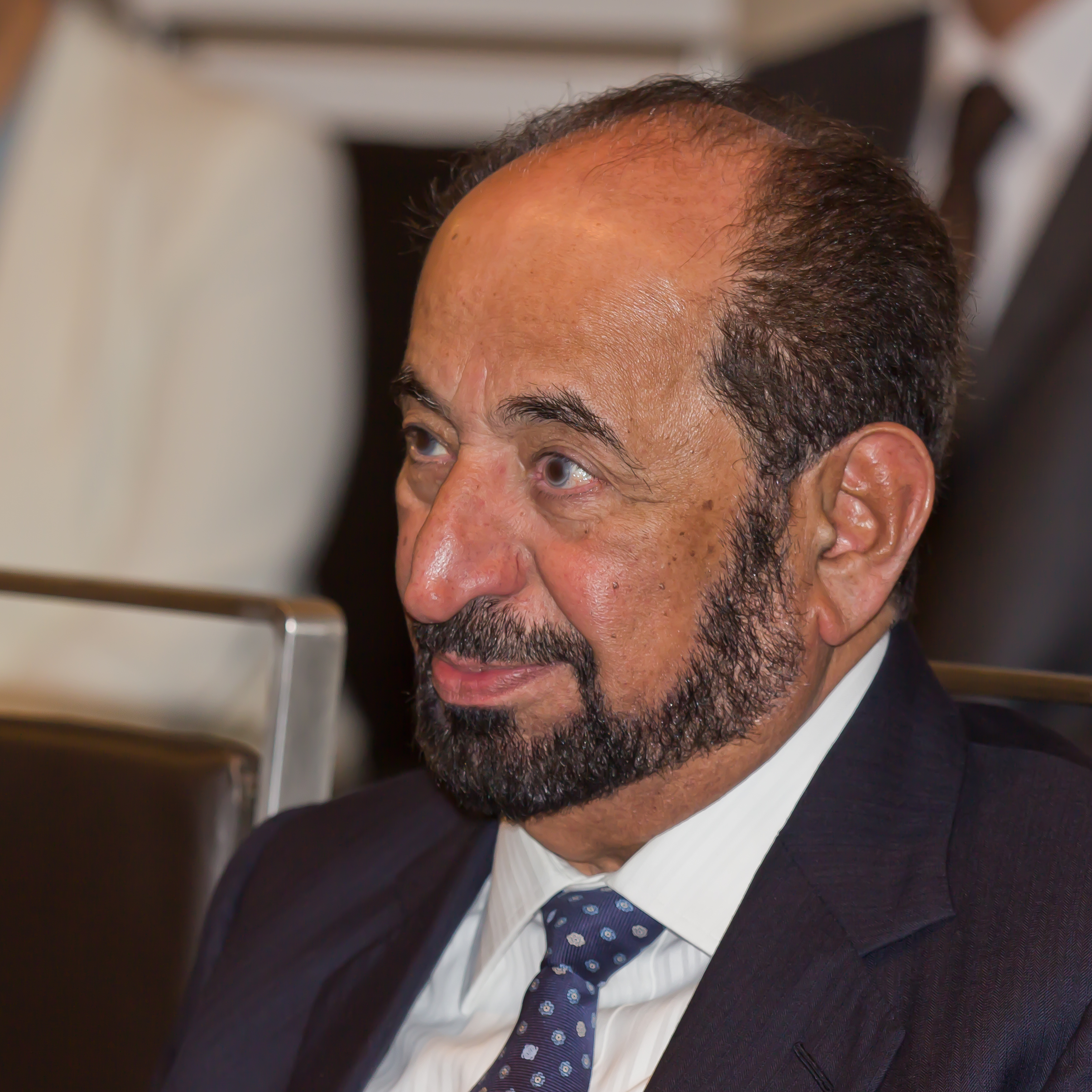
Sultan bin Muhammad Al-Qasimi

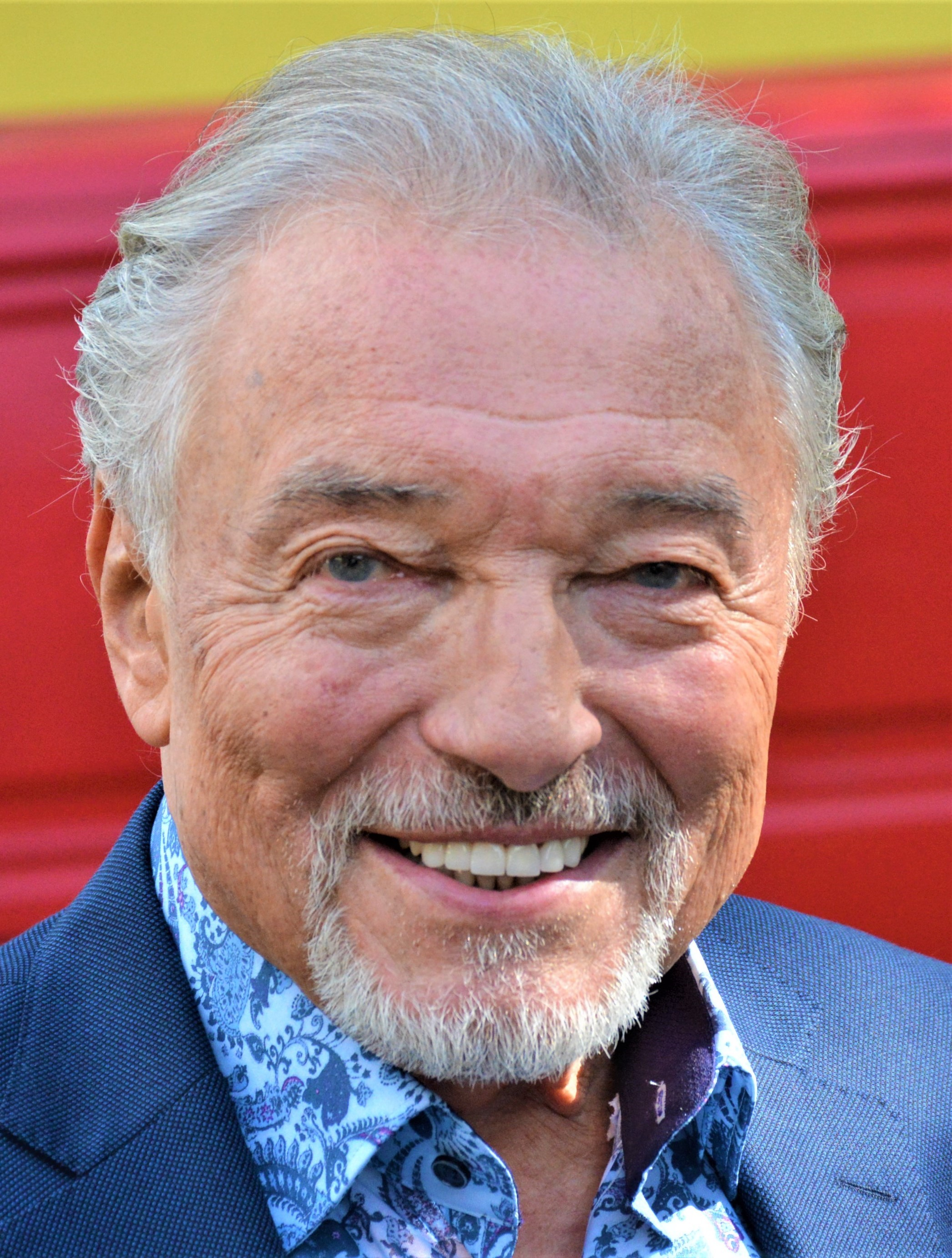
Karel Gott

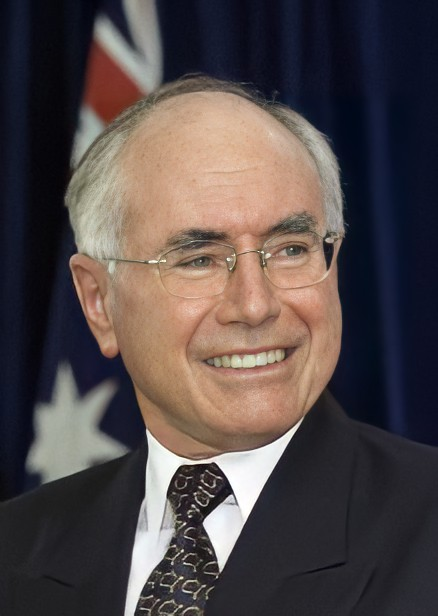
John Howard

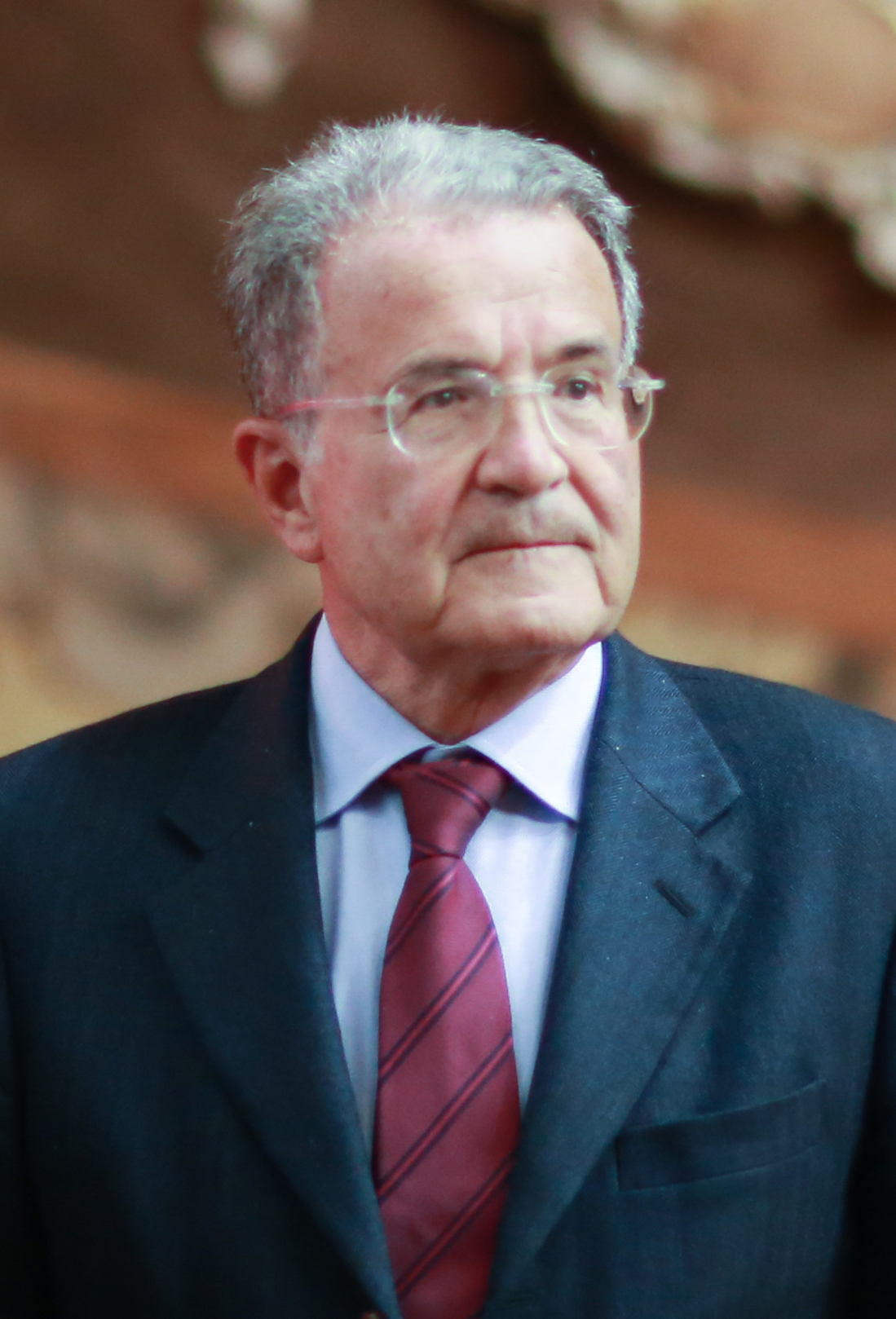
Romano Prodi

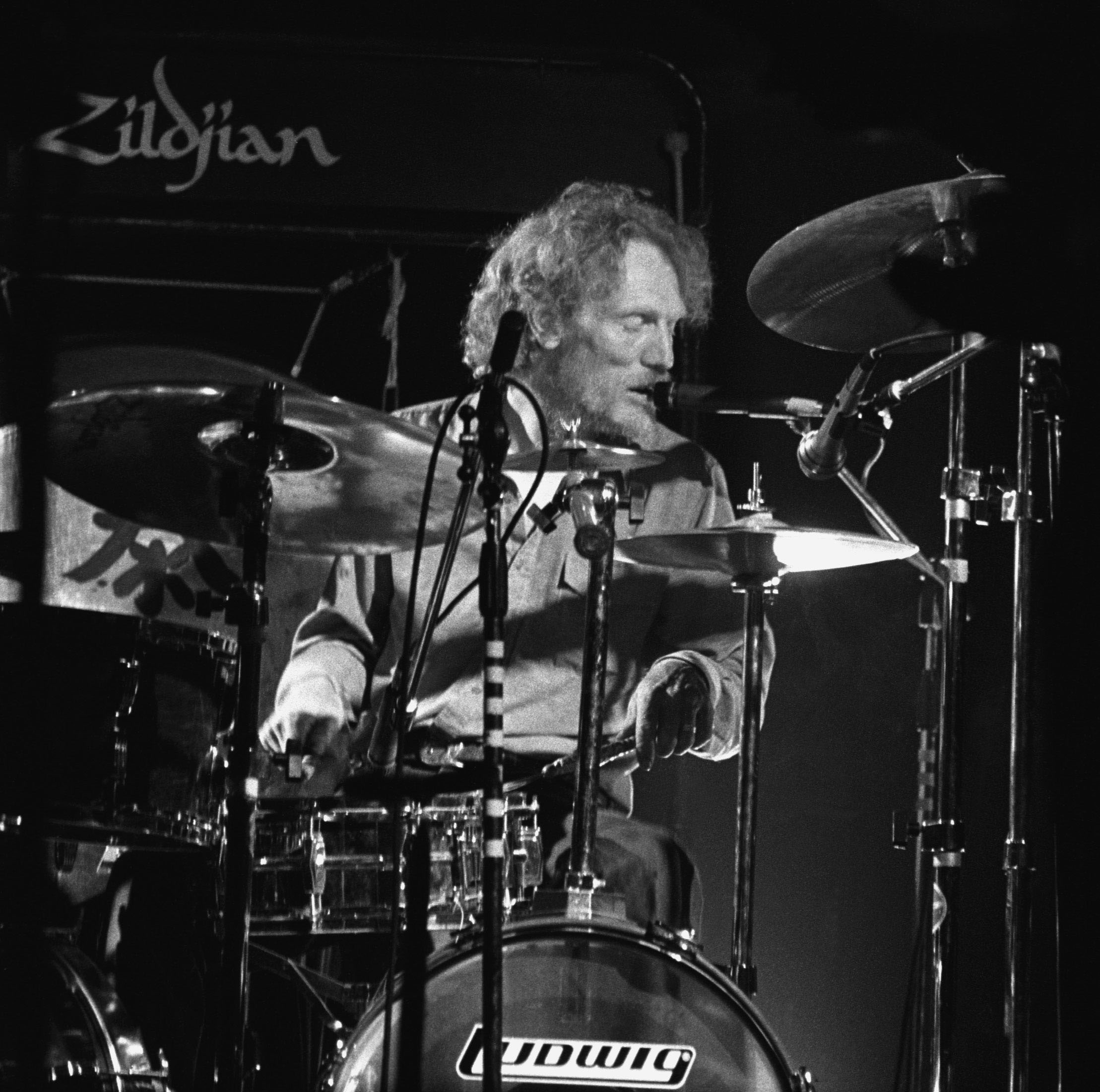
Ginger Baker

- July 1 – Kazi Zafar Ahmed, 8th Prime Minister of Bangladesh (d. 2015)
- July 4 – Abdul Aziz Abdul Ghani, 2nd Prime Minister of Yemen (d. 2011)
- July 6
  - Mary Peters, British athlete
  - Sultan bin Muhammad Al-Qasimi, sovereign ruler of the Emirate of Sharjah
- July 7 – Elena Obraztsova, Russian opera singer (d. 2015)
- July 8
  - Likulia Bolongo, Congolese politician, general and Prime Minister of Zaire
  - Abdelhamid Sharaf, Jordanian ambassador to the United States and Canada, 51st Prime Minister of Jordan (d. 1980)
- July 10 – Mavis Staples, African-American rhythm and blues, gospel singer, actress and civil rights activist
- July 13 – John Danielsen, Danish football midfielder
- July 14 – Karel Gott, Czech singer (d. 2019)
- July 15 – Aníbal Cavaco Silva, 113th Prime Minister of Portugal, 19th President of Portugal
- July 16 – Lido Vieri, Italian footballer and manager
- July 17
  - Milva, Italian singer, stage and film actress, and television personality (d. 2021)
  - Spencer Davis, Welsh Musician (d. 2020)
- July 18 – Dion DiMucci, American singer-songwriter (The Wanderer)
- July 21
  - Helmut Haller, German footballer (d. 2012)
  - Loila Hunking, American politician
- July 22 – Gila Almagor, Israeli actress and author
- July 24 – Walt Bellamy, African-American basketball player (d. 2013)
- July 26 – John Howard, 25th Prime Minister of Australia
- July 28 – Gösta Ekman, Swedish actor, comedian, and director (d. 2017)
- August 1 – Robert James Waller, American novelist (d. 2017)
- August 2
  - Ali Mroudjaé, 9th Prime Minister of the Comoros (d. 2019)
  - John W. Snow, 73rd US Treasury Secretary
- August 5 – Princess Irene of the Netherlands
- August 8 – Viorica Viscopoleanu, Romanian athlete
- August 9 – Romano Prodi, Italian politician, economist and 52nd Prime Minister of Italy
- August 11 – James Mancham, Seychellois politician, President 1976–77 (d. 2017)
- August 16
  - Seán Brady, Irish cardinal
  - Valery Ryumin, Soviet cosmonaut (d. 2022)
- August 19
  - Alan Baker, English mathematician (d. 2018)
  - Ginger Baker, English drummer (d. 2019)
- August 20 – Fernando Poe Jr., Filipino actor (d. 2004)
- August 21
  - Festus Mogae, 3rd president of Botswana (d. 2026)
  - Clarence Williams III, American actor (d. 2021)
- August 22
  - Valerie Harper, American actress (d. 2019)
  - Carl Yastrzemski, American baseball player
- August 23 – Fernando Luján, Mexican actor (d. 2019)
- August 27 – Bill Mulliken, American swimmer (d. 2014)
- August 29 – Joel Schumacher, American film producer and director (d. 2020)

=== September ===
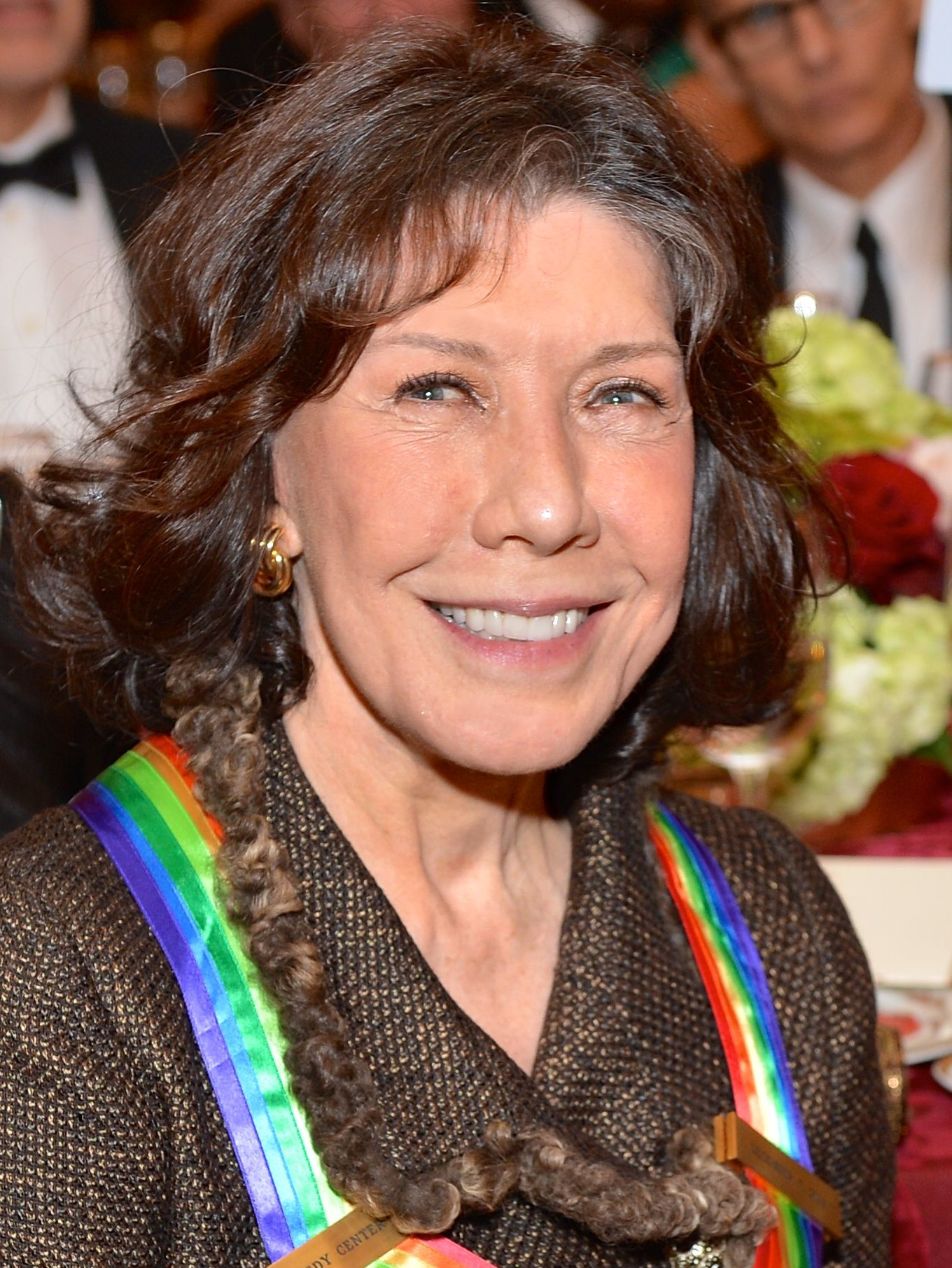
Lily Tomlin

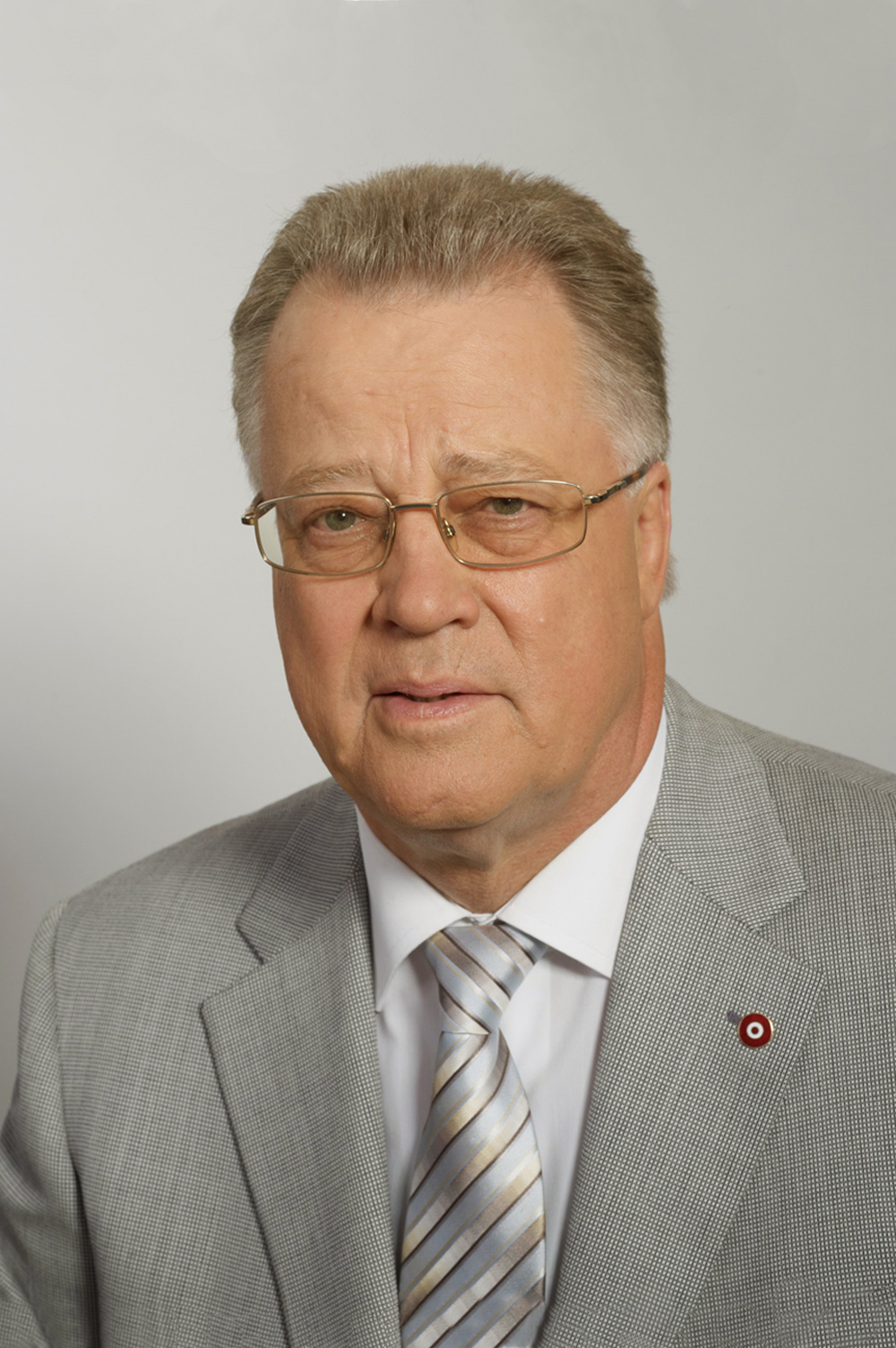
Guntis Ulmanis

- September 1 – Lily Tomlin, American actress (Rowan and Martin's Laugh-In)
- September 5
  - George Lazenby, Australian actor
  - Claudette Colvin, American civil rights activist and nurse (d. 2026)
  - Clay Regazzoni, Swiss Formula One driver (d. 2006)
- September 6 – Susumu Tonegawa, Japanese biologist, recipient of the Nobel Prize in Physiology or Medicine
- September 7 – Stanislav Petrov, Soviet Air Defence Forces official (d. 2017)
- September 8 – Carsten Keller, German field hockey player
- September 9 – Reuven Rivlin, 10th President of Israel
- September 11 – Charles Geschke, American inventor and businessman (d. 2021)
- September 13 – Guntis Ulmanis, 5th President of Latvia
- September 16 – Breyten Breytenbach, South African writer and painter (d. 2024)
- September 18 – Jorge Sampaio, 17th President of Portugal (d. 2021)
- September 22 – Junko Tabei, Japanese mountaineer (d. 2016)
- September 27 – Kathy Whitworth, American professional golfer (d. 2022)
- September 30 – Jean-Marie Lehn, French chemist, Nobel Prize laureate

=== October ===
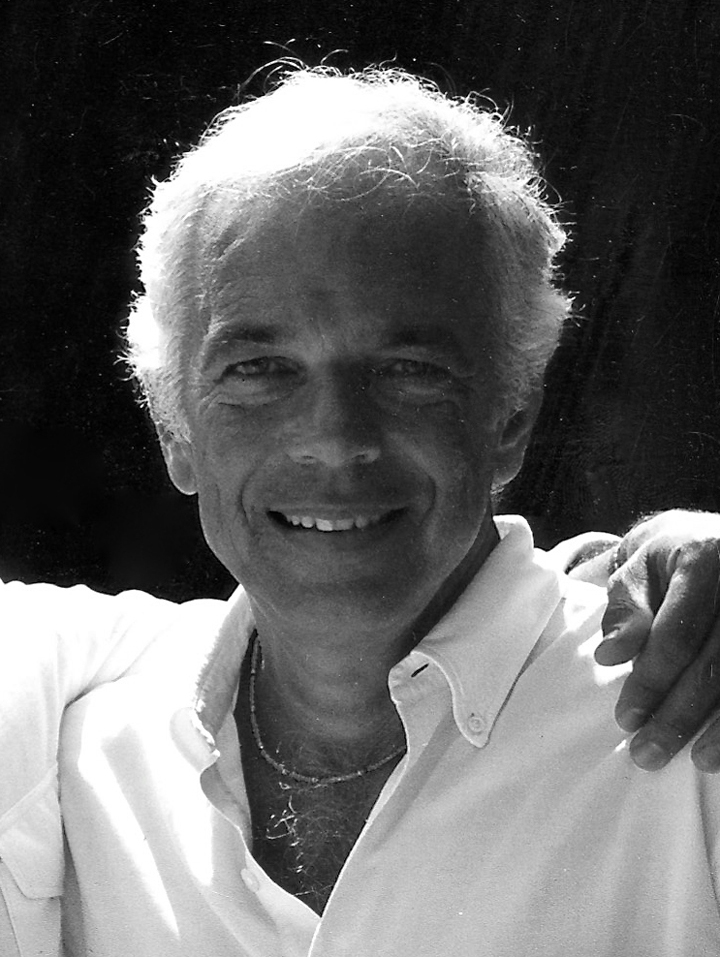
Ralph Lauren

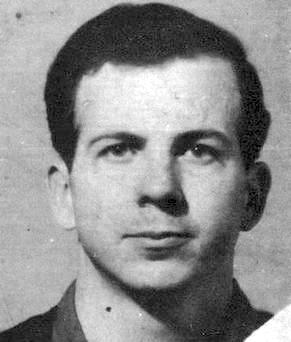
Lee Harvey Oswald

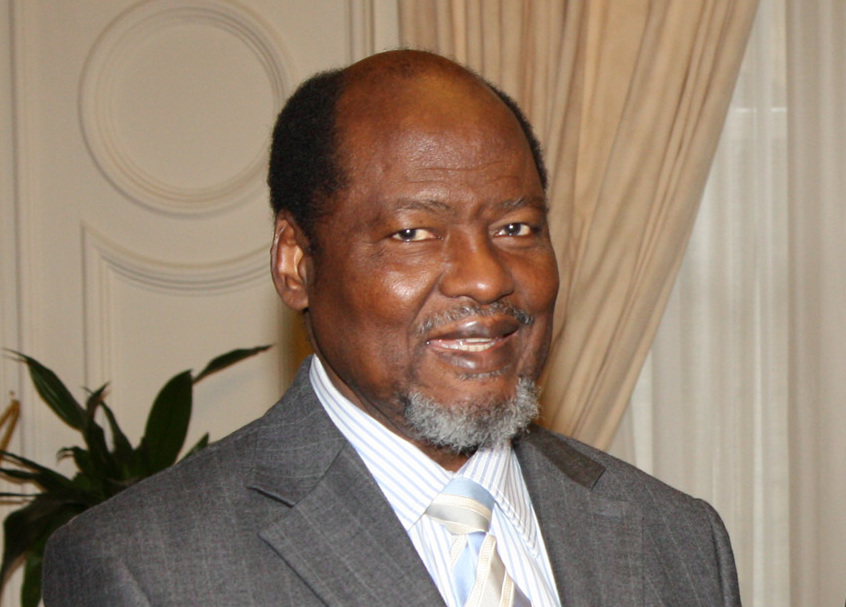
Joaquim Chissano

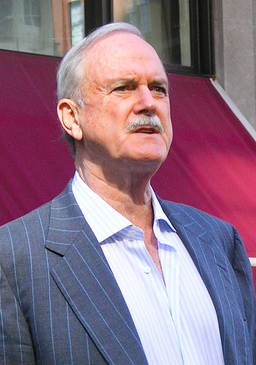
John Cleese

- October 3 – Aleksandrs Kudrjašovs, primate in the Latvian Orthodox Church and the Metropolitan of Riga and all Latvia.
- October 4 – Ivan Mauger, New Zealand speedway rider, 6 times World Speedway Champion (d. 2018)
- October 7
  - John Hopcroft, American computer scientist
  - Clive James, Australian-born writer, humorist and television personality (d. 2019)
  - Harold Kroto, English organic chemist, Nobel Prize laureate (d. 2016)
- October 8 – Paul Hogan, Australian actor and comedian
- October 9
  - Carmen Salinas, Mexican actress and politician (d. 2021)
  - John Pilger, Australian-born journalist (d. 2023)
- October 11 – Maria Bueno, Brazilian tennis player (d. 2018)
- October 14 – Ralph Lauren, American fashion designer
- October 18 – Lee Harvey Oswald, American assassin of President John F. Kennedy (d. 1963)
- October 21 – Archbishop Christodoulos of Athens (d. 2008)
- October 22 – Joaquim Chissano, President of Mozambique
- October 24
  - F. Murray Abraham, American actor (Amadeus)
  - Madalena Iglésias, Portuguese actress and singer (d. 2018)
- October 27 – John Cleese, English comic actor and writer
- October 28 – Jane Alexander, American actress
- October 30
  - Leland H. Hartwell, American scientist, recipient of the Nobel Prize in Physiology or Medicine
  - Grace Slick, American rock singer (Jefferson Airplane)
- October 31
  - Ali Farka Touré, Malian singer (d. 2006)
  - Ron Rifkin, American actor

=== November ===
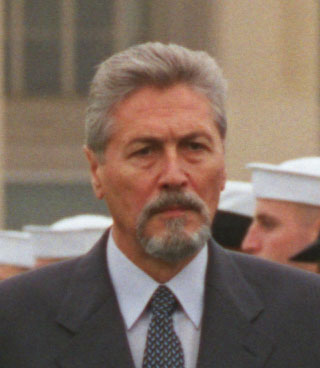
Emil Constantinescu

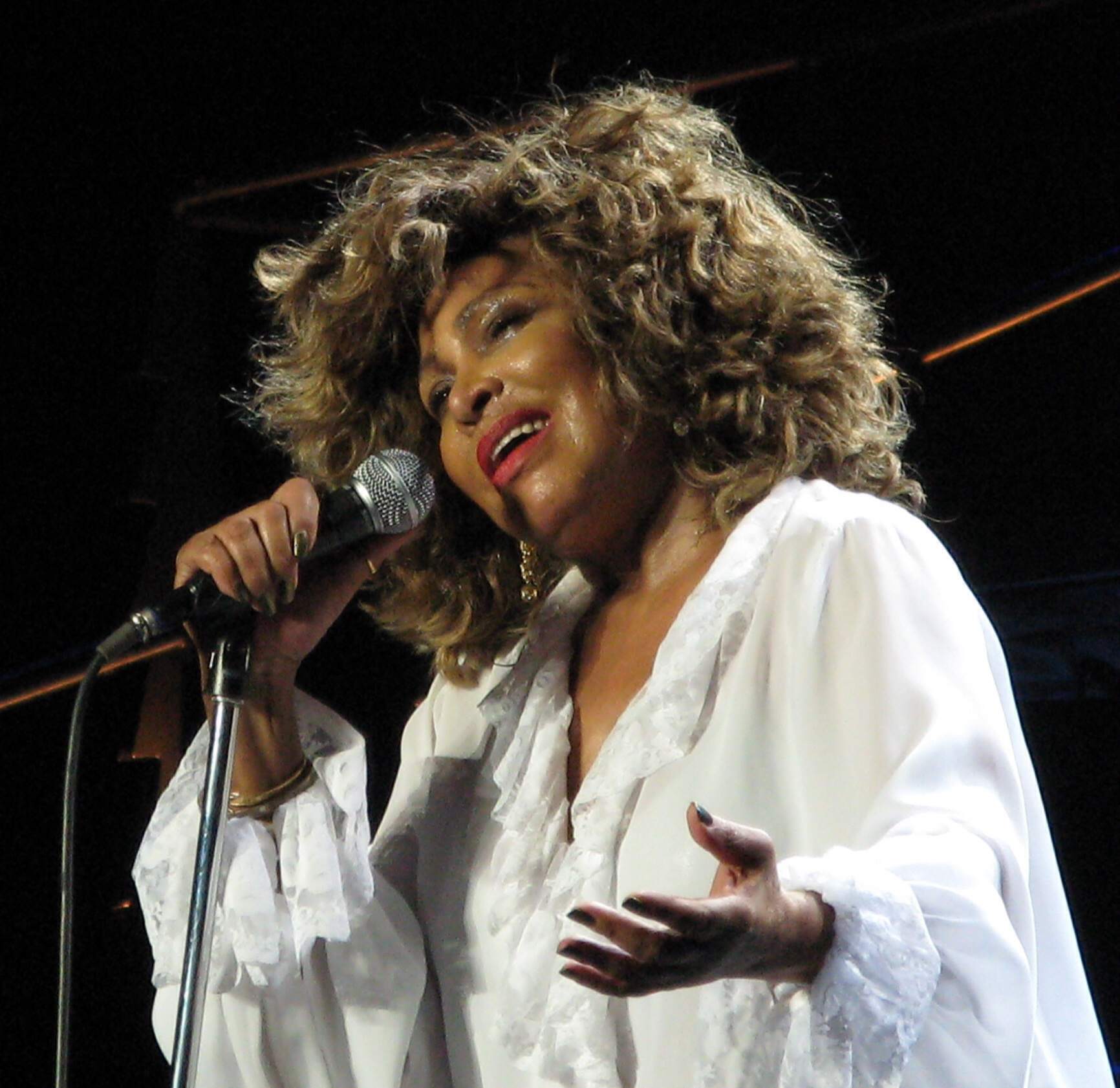
Tina Turner

- November 1 – Barbara Bosson, American actress (d. 2023)
- November 6
  - Athanasios Angelopoulos, Greek academic
  - Carlos Emilio Morales, Cuban jazz guitarist (d. 2014)
- November 8 – Laila Kinnunen, Finnish singer (d. 2000)
- November 14 – Wendy Carlos, American electronic composer
- November 15 – Yaphet Kotto, African-American actor (d. 2021)
- November 18
  - Margaret Atwood, Canadian novelist
  - Brenda Vaccaro, American actress
- November 19 – Emil Constantinescu, President of Romania
- November 21 – R. Budd Dwyer, American politician, 30th Treasurer of Pennsylvania (d. 1987)
- November 25
  - Rais Khan, Pakistani sitarist (d. 2017)
  - Thomas Resetarits, Austrian sculptor (d. 2022)
- November 26
  - Abdullah Ahmad Badawi, 5th Prime Minister of Malaysia (d. 2025)
  - Shettima Mustafa, Nigerian politician (d. 2022)
  - Tina Turner, American born Swiss singer and actress (d. 2023)
- November 27
  - Laurent-Désiré Kabila, 3rd President of the Democratic Republic of the Congo (d. 2001)
  - Ulla Strömstedt, Swedish actress (d. 1986)

=== December ===
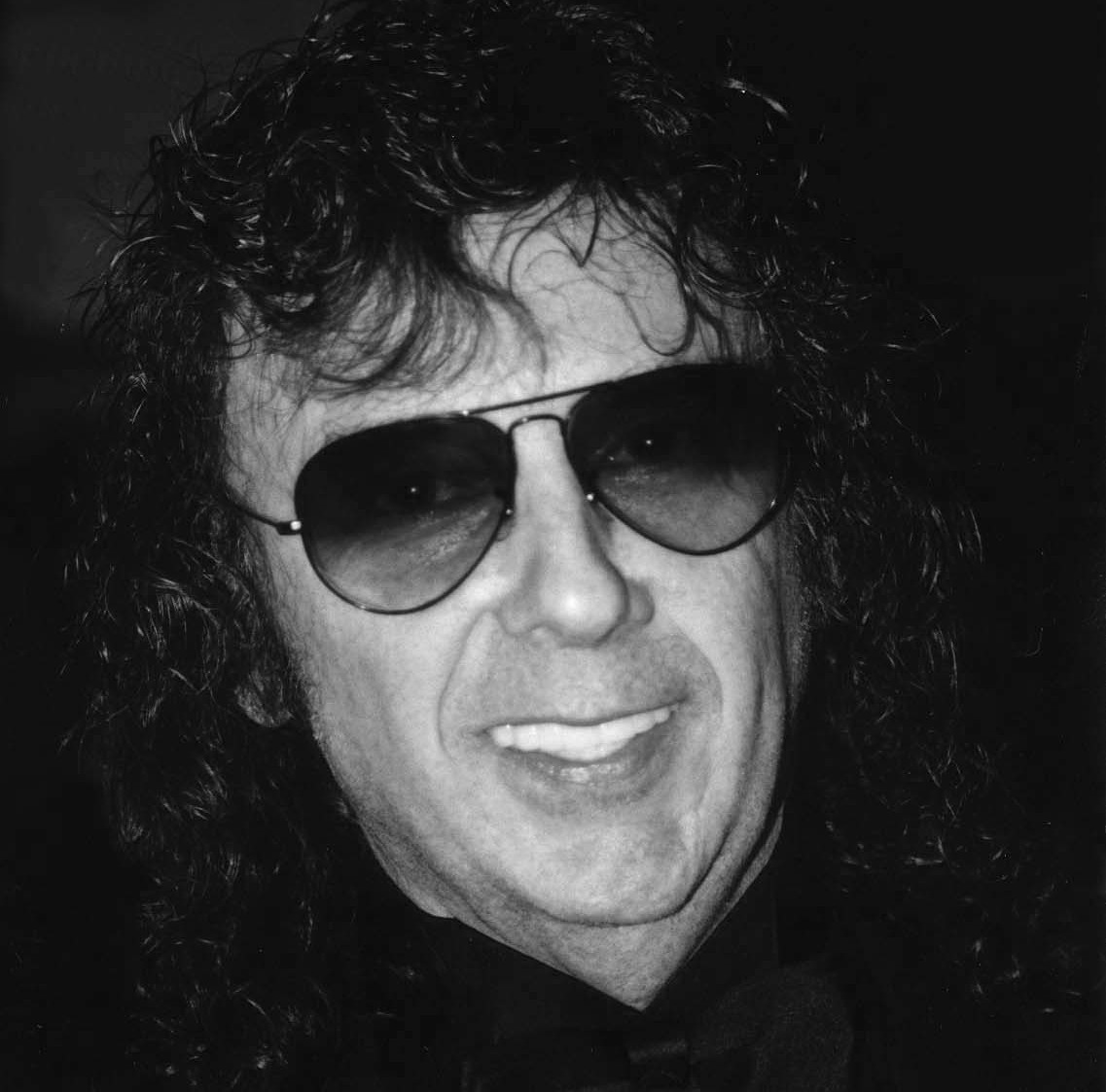
Phil Spector

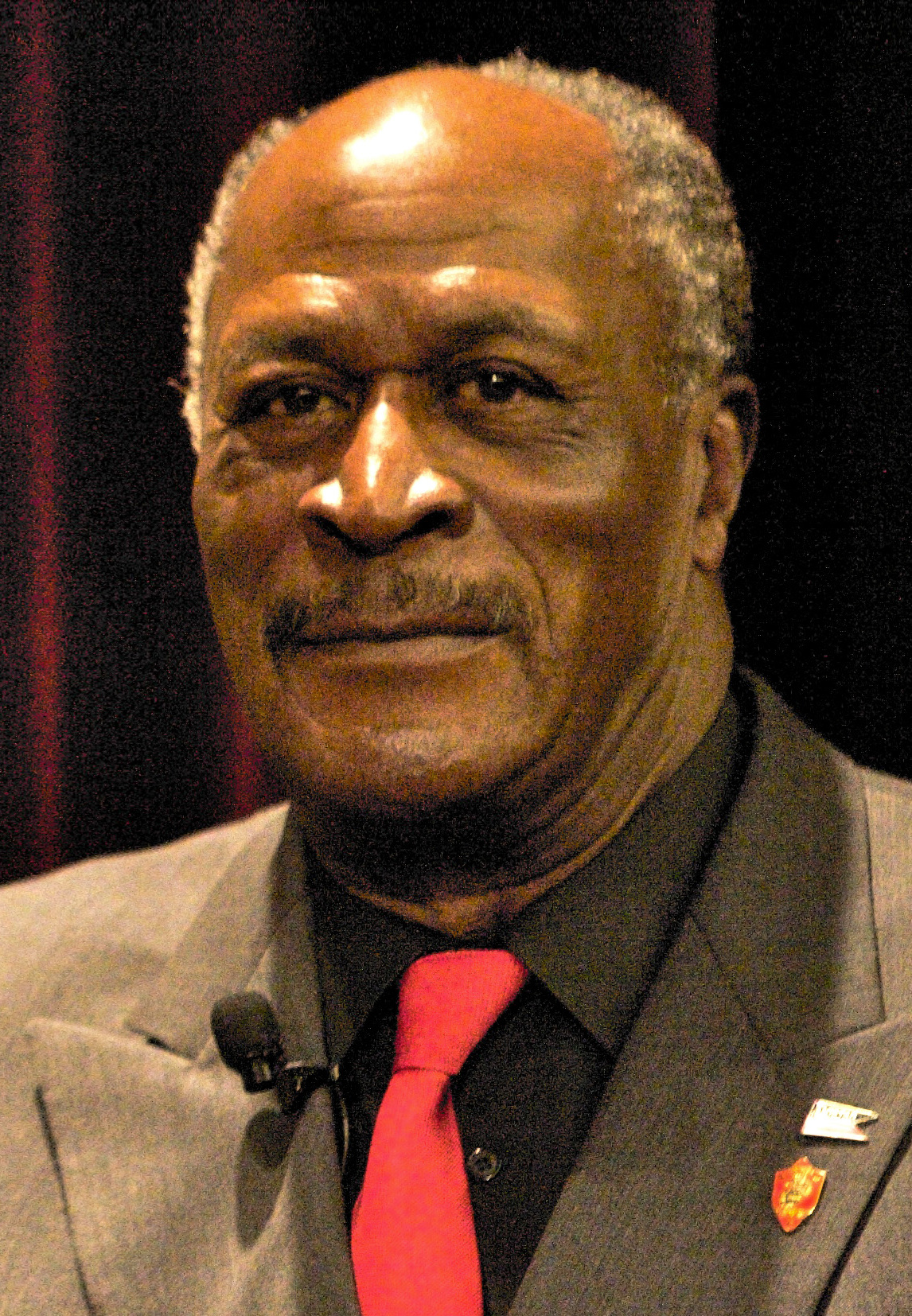
John Amos

- December 1 – Lee Trevino, American professional golfer
- December 8
  - James Galway, Irish flautist
  - Fahrudin Jusufi, Kosovar-Serbian footballer and coach (d. 2019)
- December 15
  - Cindy Birdsong, American singer
  - Dave Clark, English musician, songwriter and drummer
- December 17 – Eddie Kendricks, African-American singer (The Temptations) (d. 1992)
- December 18
  - Pedro Jirón, Nicaraguan footballer
  - Michael Moorcock, English science fiction writer
  - Harold E. Varmus, American scientist, recipient of the Nobel Prize in Physiology or Medicine
- December 25 – Bob James, American jazz musician and record producer
- December 26 – Phil Spector, American record producer (d. 2021)
- December 27 – John Amos, African-American actor (Good Times) (d. 2024)

=== Date unknown ===
- Hoichi Kurisu, Japanese landscape architect

== Deaths ==
=== January ===
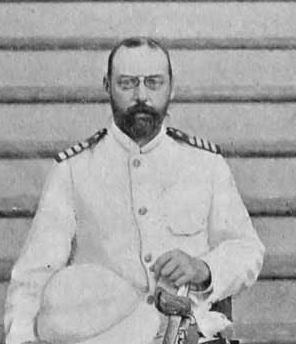
Prince Valdemar of Denmark

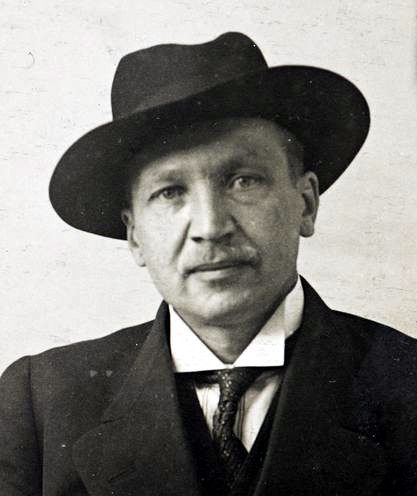
Kullervo Manner

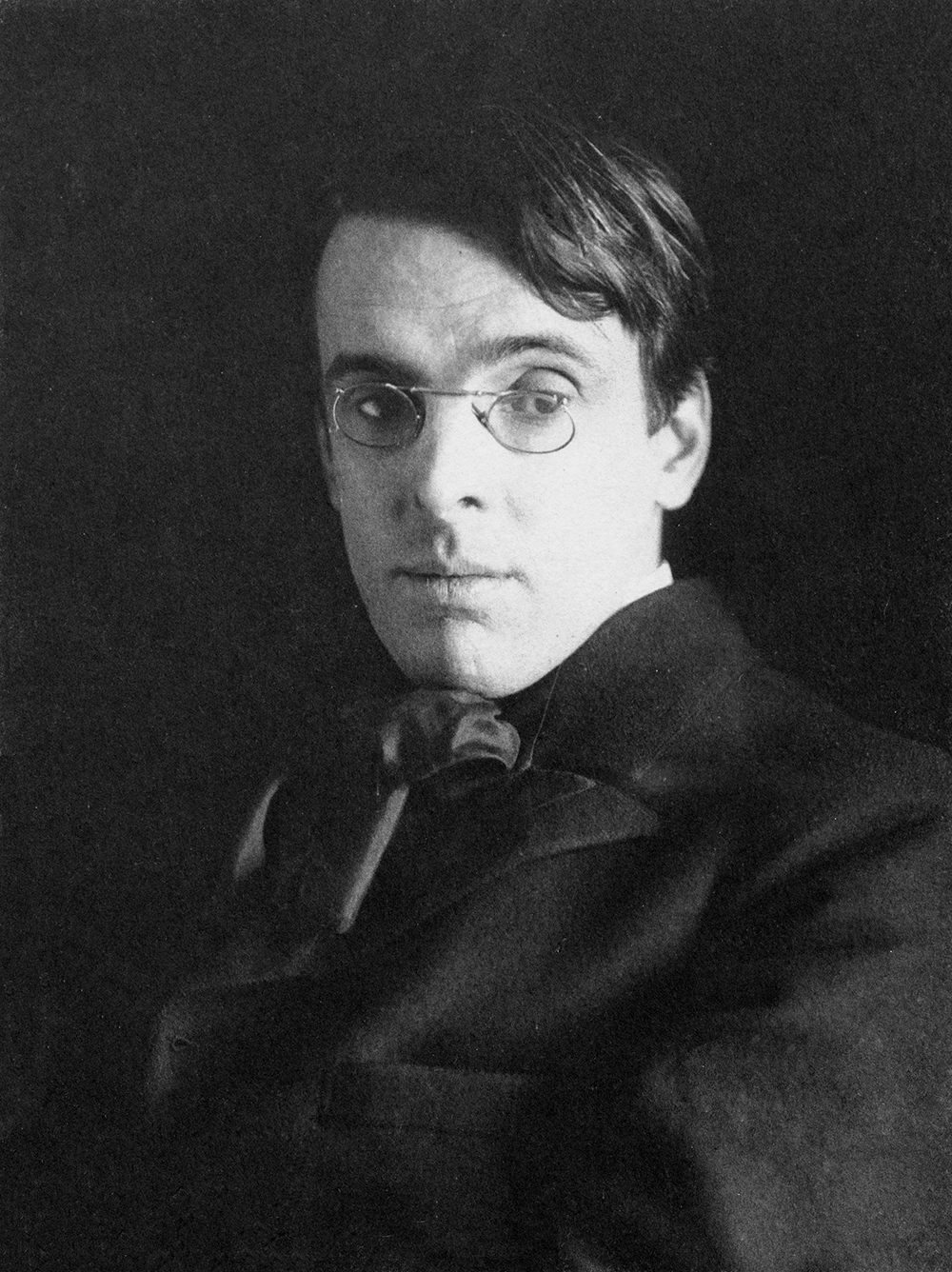
W. B. Yeats

- January 2 – Roman Dmowski, Polish politician (b. 1864)
- January 4 – Mary J. L. Black, Canadian librarian and suffragist (b. 1879)
- January 6 – Gustavs Zemgals, 2nd President of Latvia (b. 1871)
- January 8 – Charles Eastman, American author, physician, reformer, helped found the Boy Scouts of America (b. 1858)
- January 14 – Prince Valdemar of Denmark (b. 1858)
- January 15 – Kullervo Manner, Finnish Speaker of the Parliament, the Prime Minister of the FSWR and the Supreme Commander of the Red Guards (b. 1880)
- January 18 – Ivan Mosjoukine, Soviet actor (b. 1889)
- January 22 – Léopold Bernhard Bernstamm, Soviet sculptor (b. 1859)
- January 23 – Matthias Sindelar, Austrian footballer (b. 1903)
- January 24 – Maximilian Bircher-Benner, Swiss physician, nutritionist (b. 1867)
- January 25 – Helen Ware, American actress (b. 1877)
- January 28 – W. B. Yeats, Irish writer, 1923 Nobel Prize laureate (b. 1865)

=== February ===
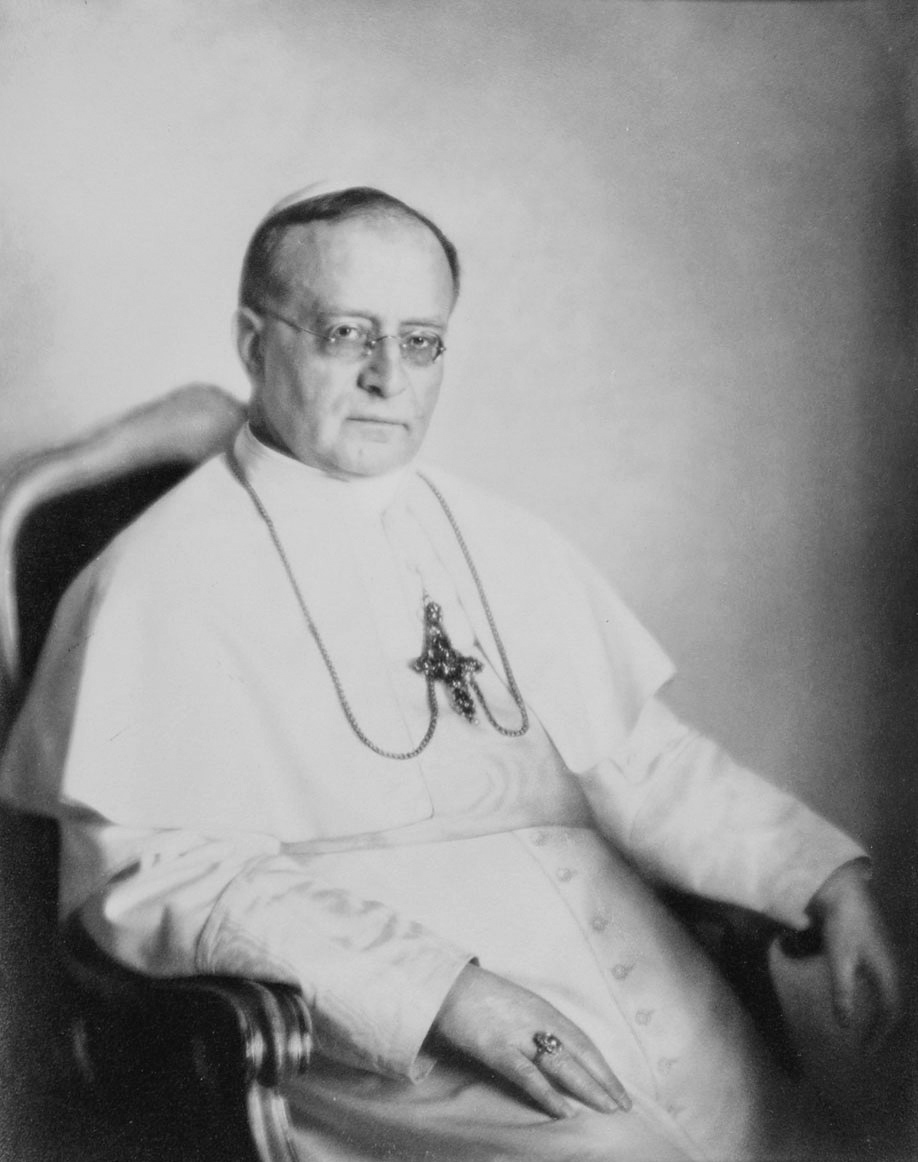
Pope Pius XI

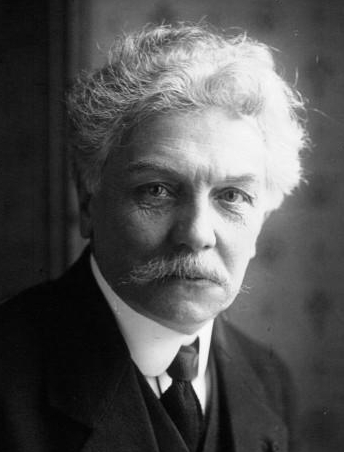
Henri Jaspar

- February 1 – Lawrence Marston, American actor, playwright, and film director (b. 1857)
- February 3 – Janez Frančišek Gnidovec, Yugoslav Roman Catholic priest and venerable (b. 1873)
- February 4 – Edward Sapir, German-American anthropologist and linguist (b. 1884)
- February 5 – Teresa Mañé, Spanish teacher, editor and writer (b. 1865)
- February 6 – Sayajirao Gaekwad III, Maharada of Baroda (b. 1863)
- February 9 – Henry Balfour, British archaeologist (b. 1863)
- February 10
  - Pope Pius XI (b. 1857)
  - Patriarch Torkom Koushagian of Jerusalem (b. 1874)
- February 11 – Franz Schmidt, Austrian composer (b. 1874)
- February 12
  - Potenciano Gregorio, Filipino musician (b. 1880)
  - S. P. L. Sørensen, Danish chemist (b. 1868)
- February 13 – Sir Alexander Hamilton-Gordon, British general (b. 1859)
- February 15 – Henri Jaspar, Belgian politician, 27th Prime Minister of Belgium (b. 1870)
- February 16 – Josef Moroder-Lusenberg, Austro-Italian artist (b.1846)
- February 18 – Kanoko Okamoto, Japanese tanka poet (b. 1899)
- February 22 – Antonio Machado, Spanish poet (b. 1875)
- February 23 – Michael Knatchbull, 5th Baron Brabourne, British peer, soldier (b. 1895)
- February 26 – Ivan Fedko, Soviet army commander (b. 1897)
- February 27 – Nadezhda Krupskaya, Russian Marxist revolutionary, Vladimir Lenin's widow (b. 1869)

=== March ===
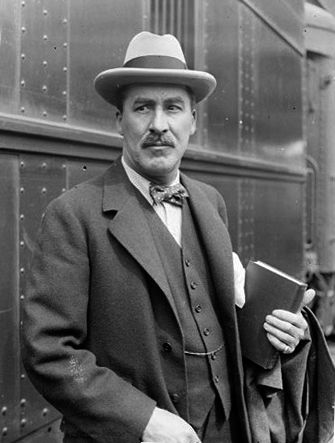
Howard Carter

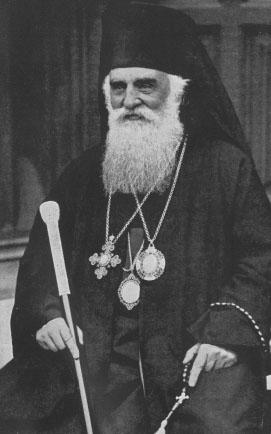
Patriarch Miron of Romania

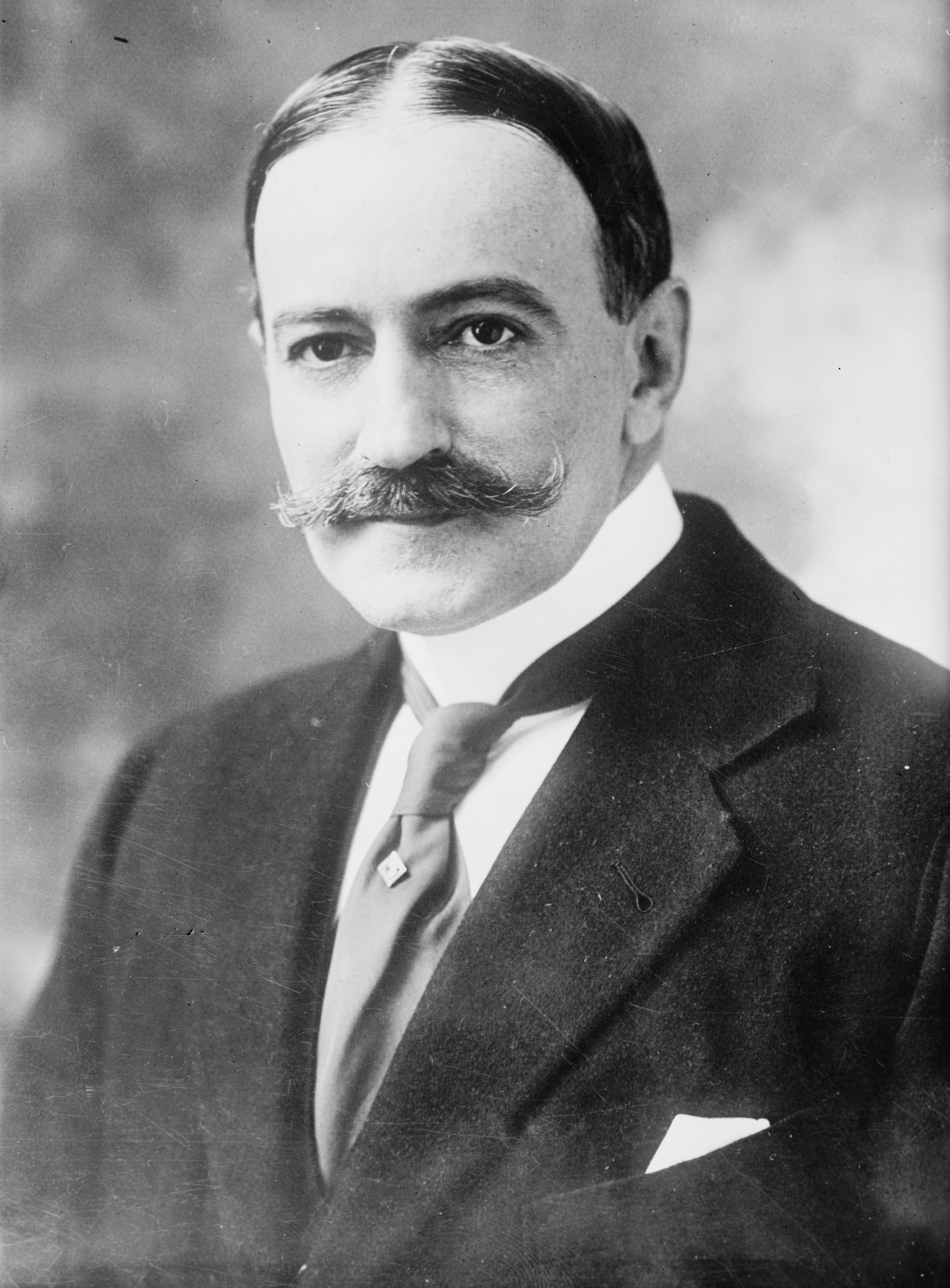
Carlos Manuel de Cespedes y Quesada

- March 2 – Howard Carter, British archaeologist (b. 1874)
- March 3 – Dimitrie Gerota, Romanian anatomist, physician (b. 1867)
- March 5 – Herbert Mundin, British actor (b. 1898)
- March 6
  - Ginepro Cocchi, Italian Roman Catholic priest and Servant of God (b. 1908)
  - Patriarch Miron of Romania, Austro-Hungarian-born Romanian cleric, politician, priest and 38th Prime Minister of Romania (b. 1868)
- March 7 – Matvei Berman, Soviet intelligence officer (b. 1898)
- March 13 – Lucien Lévy-Bruhl, French sociologist, anthropologist (b. 1857)
- March 14 – Agostino Borgato, Italian actor, director (b. 1871)
- March 21 – Avril de Sainte-Croix, French author, journalist (b. 1855)
- March 23 – Abd al-Rahim al-Hajj Muhammad, Palestinian revolutionary (b. 1892)
- March 27 – Ferdinand von Quast, German general (b. 1850)
- March 28
  - Carlos Manuel de Cespedes y Quesada, Cuban diplomat, politician, writer and 6th President of Cuba (b. 1871)
  - Mario Lertora, Italian artistic gymnast in the 1924 Summer Olympics (b. 1897)
- March 29 – Gerardo Machado, Cuban general, 5th President of Cuba (b. 1871)
- March 31 – Ioannis Tsangaridis, Greek general (b. 1887)

=== April ===
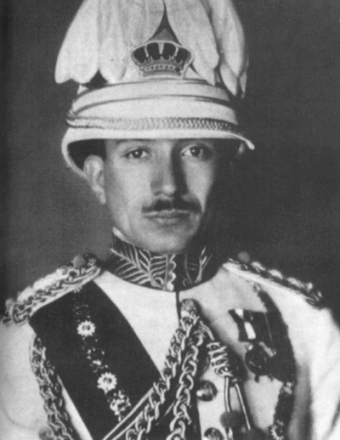
King Ghazi of Iraq

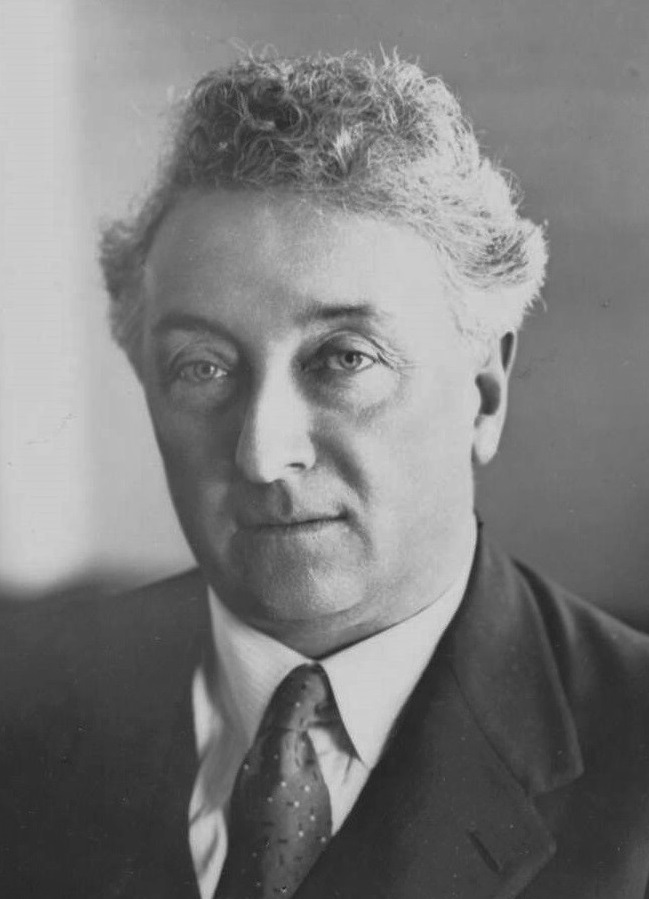
Joseph Lyons

- April 4
  - King Ghazi of Iraq (b. 1912)
  - Joaquín García Morato, Spanish fighter ace (b. 1904)
- April 7 – Joseph Lyons, 10th Prime Minister of Australia, Premier of Tasmania (b. 1879)
- April 15 – Konstantin Petrovich Grigorovich, Soviet engineer, professor (b. 1886)
- April 17 – Ludwig Herzer, Austrian musician and composer (b. 1872)
- April 18
  - Ishbel Hamilton-Gordon, Marchioness of Aberdeen and Temair, British writer, philanthropist (b. 1857)
  - Hugo Charlemont, Austrian painter (b. 1850)
- April 19
  - Lucilio de Albuquerque, Brazilian painter (b. 1877)
  - János Vaszary, Hungarian painter and graphic artist (b. 1867)
- April 20 – Archduke Franz Salvator of Austria, the son of Archduke Karl Salvator of Austria and Princess Maria Immacolata of Bourbon-Two Sicilies (b. 1866)
- April 22 – Leandro Campanari, Italian conductor, composer and violinist (b. 1859)
- April 25
  - John Foulds, British classical music composer (b. 1880)
  - Georges Ricard-Cordingley, French painter (b. 1873)
- April 27 – José Gola, Argentinian actor (b. 1904)
- April 28 – Archduke Leo Karl of Austria (b. 1893)

=== May ===
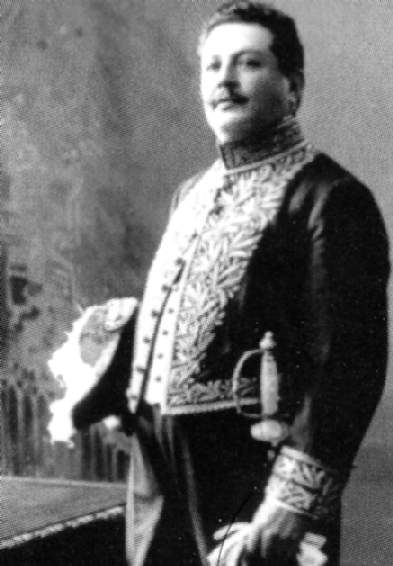
Bautista Saavedra

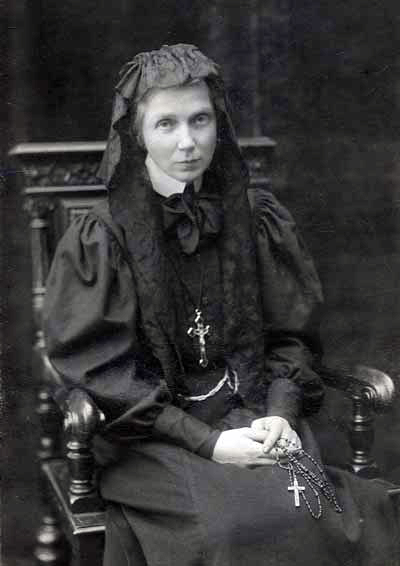
Saint Ursula Ledóchowska

- May 1 – Bautista Saavedra, 29th President of Bolivia (b. 1870)
- May 2 – Phillips Smalley, American actor, director (b. 1875)
- May 3 – Wilhelm Groener, German general (b. 1867)
- May 4 – James A. Johnson, American architect (b. 1865)
- May 7 – Francesco Paleari, Italian priest and blessed (b. 1863)
- May 9 – Mary, Lady Heath, Irish aviator (b. 1896)
- May 10 – James Parrott, American actor (b. 1898)
- May 13 – Victor Bernau, Norwegian actor, director (b. 1890)
- May 14
  - Jesse Price, American politician and member of the United States House of Representatives from 1914 to 1919 (b. 1863)
- May 19 – Ahmet Ağaoğlu, Turkish politician, author and writer (b. 1869)
- May 20
  - Joseph Carr, 2nd president of the National Football League (b. 1880)
  - Alexandra Čvanová, Ukrainian-Czech soprano (b. 1897)
- May 22 – Ernst Toller, German playwright, Communist politician (b. 1893)
- May 24
  - Aleksander Brückner, German scholar (b. 1856)
  - Witmer Stone, American ornithologist, botanist, and mammalogist (b. 1866)
- May 25 – Álvaro Casanova Zenteno, Chilean painter (b. 1857)
- May 25 – Frank Watson Dyson, British astronomer (b. 1868)
- May 27 – Alfred A. Cunningham, American aviator, the first United States Marine Corps aviator (b. 1882)
- May 29 – Ursula Ledóchowska, Polish Roman Catholic religious professed and saint (b. 1865)
- May 30 – Floyd Roberts, American race car driver (b. 1900)

=== June ===
- June 4 – Tommy Ladnier, American jazz trumpeter (b. 1900)
- June 6
  - George Fawcett, American actor (b. 1860)
  - Constantin Noe, Megleno-Romanian editor and professor (b. 1883)
- June 9 – Owen Moore, Irish-born American actor (b. 1886)
- June 15 – Edward Chaytor, New Zealand general (b. 1868)
- June 16 – Chick Webb, American musician (b. 1905)
- June 19 – Grace Abbott, American social worker (b. 1878)
- June 22 – Benjamin Tucker, American anarchist (b. 1854)
- June 23 – Ernest Alexander Cruikshank, Canadian general (b. 1859)
- June 25 – Richard Seaman, British motor racing driver (b. 1913)
- June 26 – Ford Madox Ford, British writer (b. 1873)
- June 27 – Margaret Campbell, American actress (b. 1883)
- June 28 – Bobby Vernon, American actor (b. 1898)
- June 30 – Eduardo Lopez Bustamante, Venezuelan poet, lawyer and journalist (b. 1881)

=== July ===
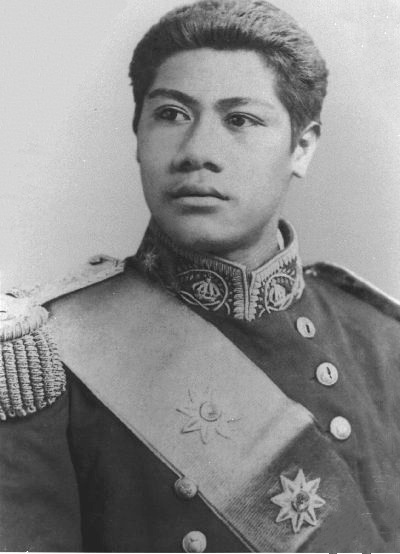
King Malietoa Tanumafili I

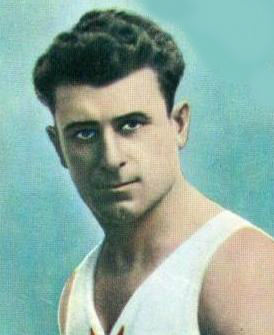
Carlo Galimberti

- July 3 – Juan José Gárate, Spanish painter (b. 1869)
- July 4 – Louis Wain, English artist (b. 1860)
- July 5 – Malietoa Tanumafili I, King of Samoa (b. 1879)
- July 7 – Deacon White, American baseball player, MLB Hall of Famer (b. 1847)
- July 8
  - Havelock Ellis, British sexologist (b. 1859)
  - Anna Pappritz, German writer, suffragist (b. 1861)
- July 9
  - Carlo Chiostri, Italian painter (b. 1863)
  - Alphonse Laurencic, French painter, architect (b. 1902)

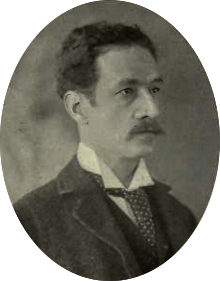
Louis Wain

- July 11 – Stiliyan Kovachev, Bulgarian general (b. 1860)
- July 14 – Alphonse Mucha, Czech painter, decorative artist (b. 1860)
- July 17 – María del Carmen González-Valerio, Spanish Roman Catholic saint (b. 1930)
- July 19 – Rose Hartwick Thorpe, American poet (b. 1850)
- July 20 – Joseph Mendes da Costa, Dutch sculptor (b. 1863)
- July 21 – Ambroise Vollard, French art dealer (b. 1866)
- July 23 – Jack Duffy, American actor (b. 1882)
- July 26 – William Mackay, American artist (b. 1876)
- July 27 – Stanisław Baczyński, Polish writer, journalist and soldier (b. 1890)

=== August ===
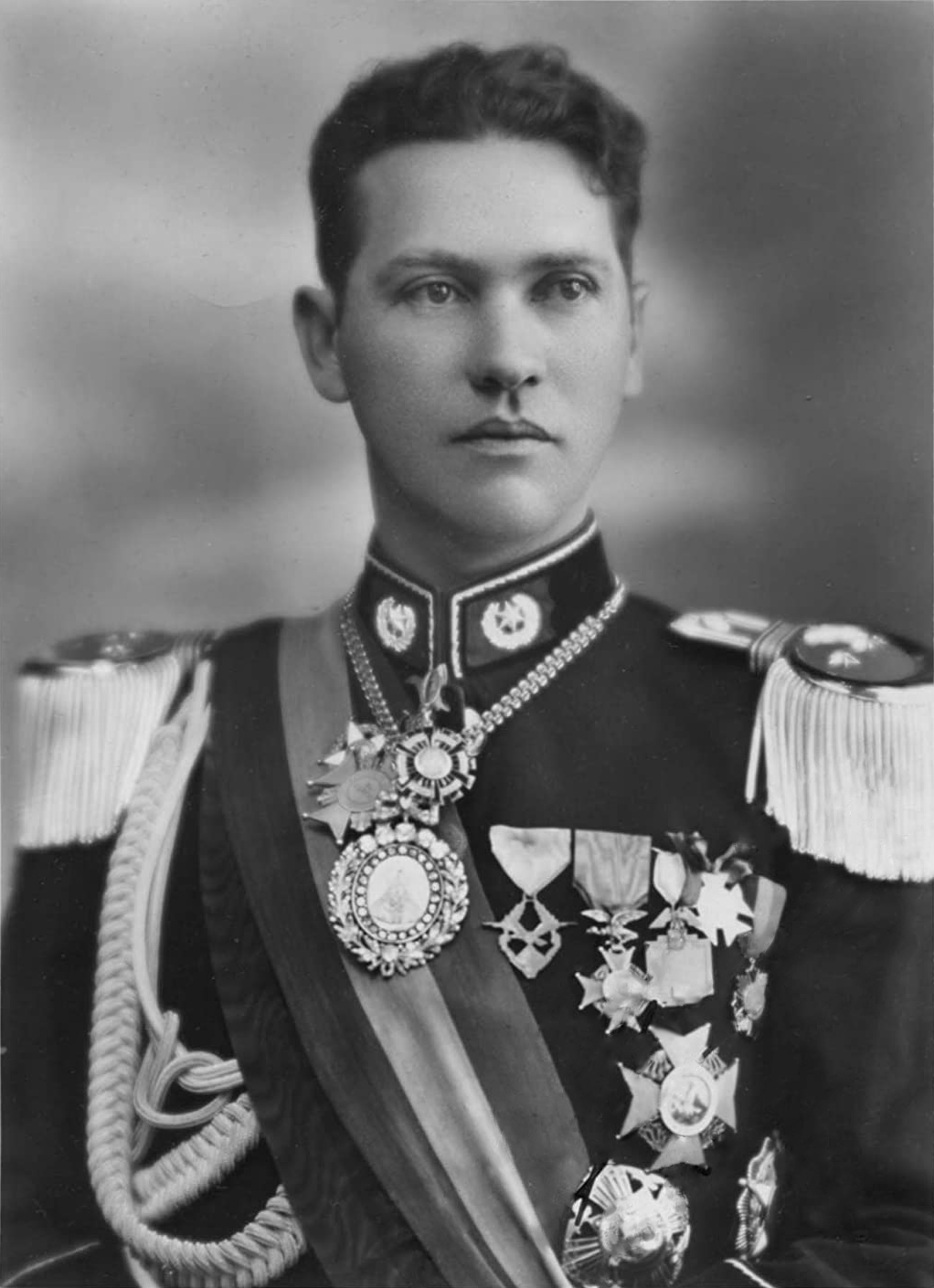
Germán Busch

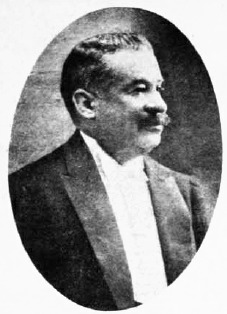
Eliodoro Villazón

- August 2 – Harvey Spencer Lewis, American mystic (b. 1883)
- August 6
  - Mehmet Emin Çolakoğlu, Turkish army general (b. 1878)
  - Monroe Dunaway Anderson, American founder of Anderson, Clayton and Company; "Father of Texas Medical Center" (b. 1873)
  - Arthur Rackham, English book illustrator (b. 1867)
- August 10 – Carlo Galimberti, Italian Olympic weightlifter (b. 1894)
- August 11 – Jean Bugatti, German automobile designer (b. 1909)
- August 12 – Eulalio Gutiérrez, 41st President of Mexico (b. 1881)
- August 23
  - Sidney Howard, American writer (b. 1891)
  - Germán Busch, 36th President of Bolivia (b. 1903)
- August 25 – Arthur Asquith, British general (b. 1883)
- August 26 – Rubén González Cárdenas, Venezuelan lawyer (b. 1875)
- August 29 – Marthe de Florian, French painter (b. 1864)
- August 31 – Richard Bouwens van der Boijen, French architect (b. 1863)

=== September ===
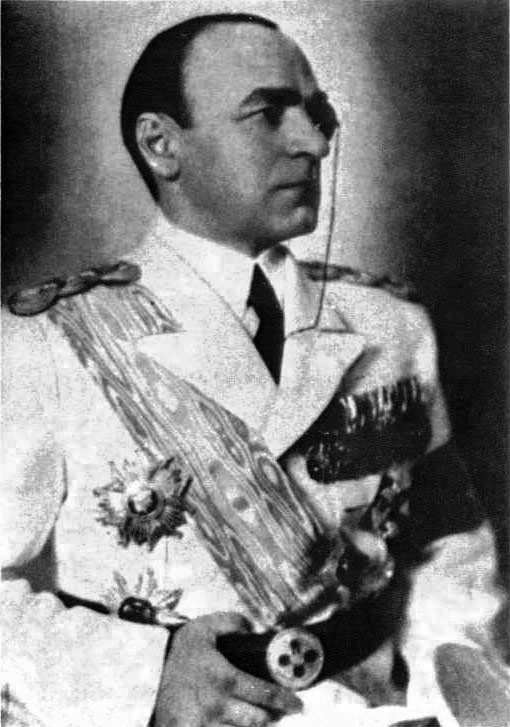
Armand Călinescu

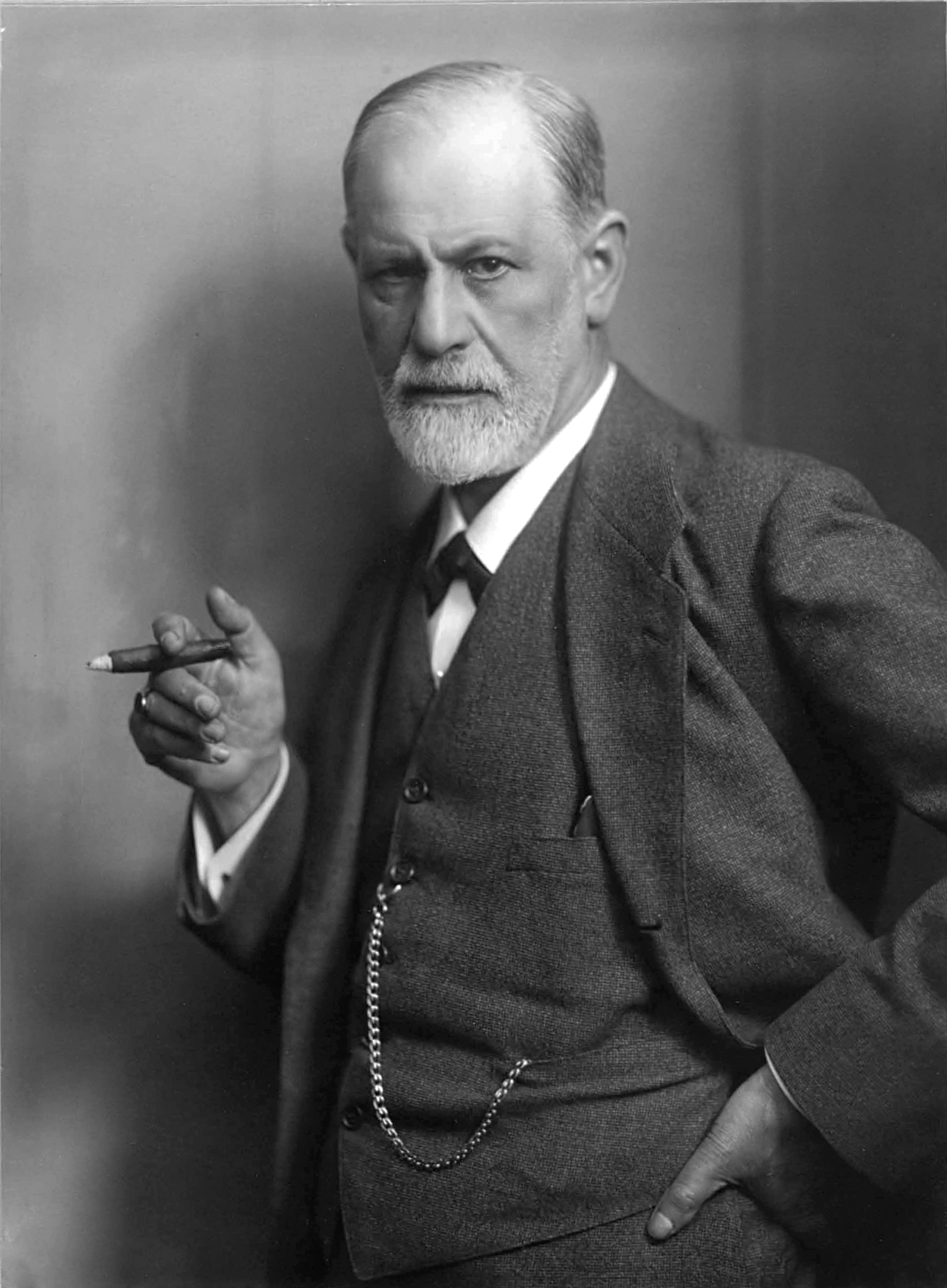
Sigmund Freud

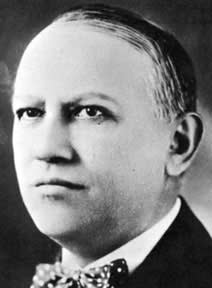
Carl Laemmle

- September 6 – Arthur Rackham, British artist (b. 1867)
- September 8 – Swami Abhedananda, Indian mystic (b. 1866)
- September 10 – Wilhelm Fritz von Roettig, German Waffen SS general, first general killed in action during World War II (b. 1888)
- September 12 – Eliodoro Villazón, 27th President of Bolivia (b. 1848)
- September 16
  - Nikolaos Triantafyllakos, Prime Minister of Greece (b. 1855)
  - Otto Wels, German politician, chairman of the Social Democratic Party of Germany (SPD) (b. 1873)
- September 18 – Stanisław Ignacy Witkiewicz, Polish writer, painter (b. 1885)
- September 20
  - Paul Bruchesi, Canadian prelate (b. 1855)
  - Hermann Brunn, German mathematician (b. 1862)
  - Andrew Claude de la Cherois Crommelin, French astronomer (b. 1865)
- September 21 – Armand Călinescu, Romanian economist, politician and 39th Prime Minister of Romania (b. 1893)
- September 22
  - Mikołaj Bołtuć, Polish army general (killed in battle) (b. 1893)
  - Józef Olszyna-Wilczyński, Polish general (b. 1890)
  - Werner von Fritsch, German general (killed in action) (b. 1880)
- September 23
  - Sigmund Freud, Austrian psychoanalyst (b. 1856)
  - Eugeniusz Kazimirowski, Polish painter (b. 1873)
  - Francisco León de la Barra, Mexican diplomat, political figure, and acting President of Mexico (b. 1863)
- September 24
  - Danilo, Crown Prince of Montenegro (b. 1871)
  - Carl Laemmle, German film producer (b. 1867)

=== October ===
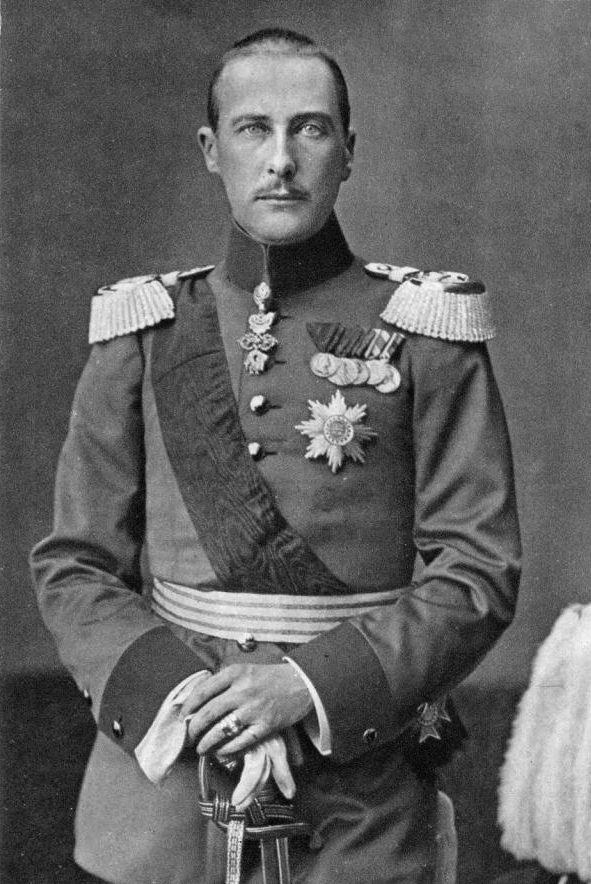
Albrecht, Duke of Württemberg

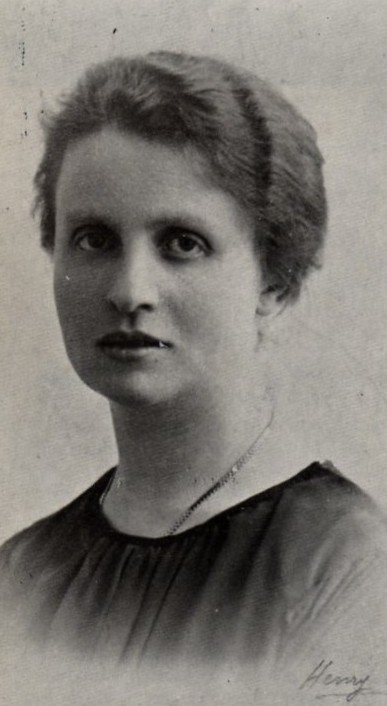
Marthe Condat

- October 2 – Edgar M. Lazarus, American architect (b. 1868)
- October 3 – Fay Templeton, American musical comedy star (b. 1865)
- October 6 – Giulio Gavotti, Italian aviator (b. 1882)
- October 7 – Harvey Cushing, American neurosurgeon (b. 1869)
- October 8 – Gustav Henriksen, Norwegian executive (b. 1872)
- October 9 – Anna Tuschinski, Esperantist from Danzig (b. 1841)
- October 13 – Ford Sterling, American actor (b. 1882)
- October 14 – Polaire, French actress (b. 1874)
- October 21 – Hendrik Wortman, Dutch civil engineer (b. 1859)
- October 23 – Zane Grey, American writer (b. 1872)
- October 24 – Marthe Condat, French physician (b. 1886)
- October 28 – Alice Brady, American actress (b. 1892)
- October 30 – Carlos De Valdez, Peruvian actor (b. 1894)
- October 31
  - Albrecht, Duke of Württemberg, German field marshal (b. 1865)
  - Otto Rank, Austrian psychoanalyst (b. 1884)

=== November ===
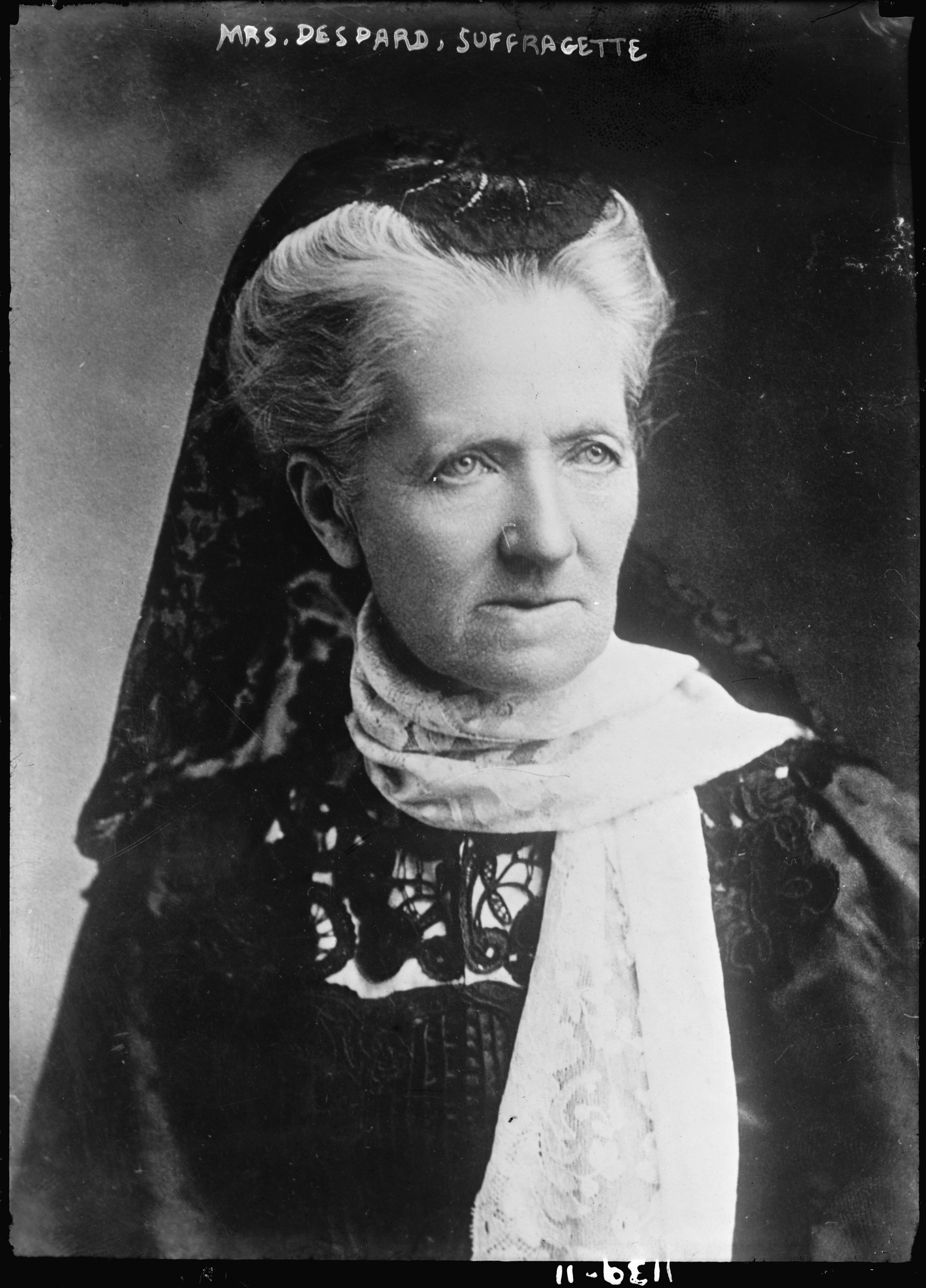
Charlotte Despard

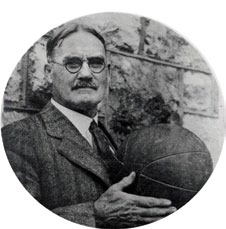
James Naismith

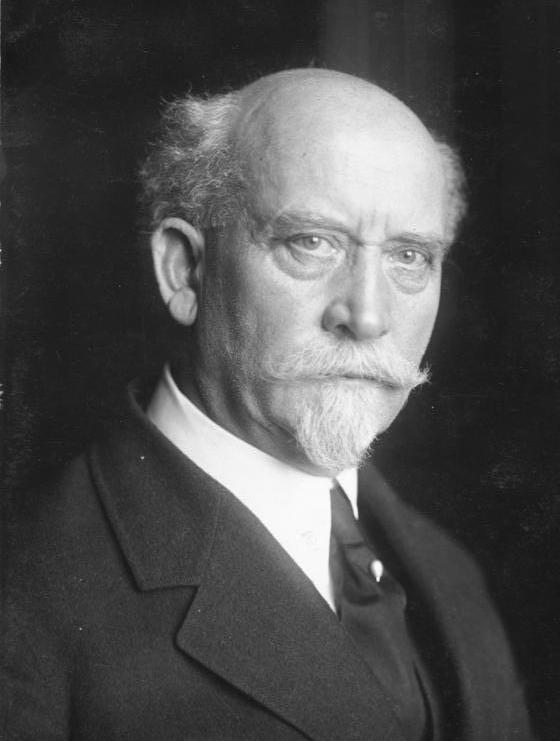
Philipp Scheidemann

- November 1 – Kálmán Darányi, 31st Prime Minister of Hungary (b. 1886)
- November 4
  - Sir Percy Douglas, chairman of the British Graham Land Expedition (BGLE) Advisory Committee (b. 1876)
  - Ma Xiangbo, Chinese Jesuit priest and blessed (b. 1840)
- November 7 – Kirsti Suonio, Finnish actress (b. 1872)
- November 10 – Charlotte Despard, Anglo-Irish suffragist, socialist, pacifist, Sinn Féin activist, and novelist
- November 11 – Alicja Kotowska, Polish Roman Catholic nun, martyr and blessed (b. 1899)
- November 12 – Norman Bethune, Canadian humanitarian (b. 1890)
- November 13 – Lois Weber, American actress (b. 1881)
- November 14 – Jay Hastings, American politician from Nebraska (b. 1878)
- November 15
  - Platon Ivanovich Ivanov, Soviet-born Finnish civil servant (b. 1863)
- November 17 – Aurelio Mosquera, Ecuadorian politician, 25th President of Ecuador (b. 1883)
- November 21 – Émile Guépratte, French admiral (b. 1856)
- November 22 – King Daudi Cwa II of Buganda (b. 1896)
- November 24 – John Harron, American actor (b. 1903)
- November 28 – James Naismith, Canadian inventor of basketball (b. 1861)
- November 29
  - Eugen Kolisko, Austrian-born German physician, educator (b. 1893)
  - Józef Krasnowolski, Polish painter (b. 1879)
  - Philipp Scheidemann, German politician, 11th Chancellor of Germany (b. 1865)

=== December ===
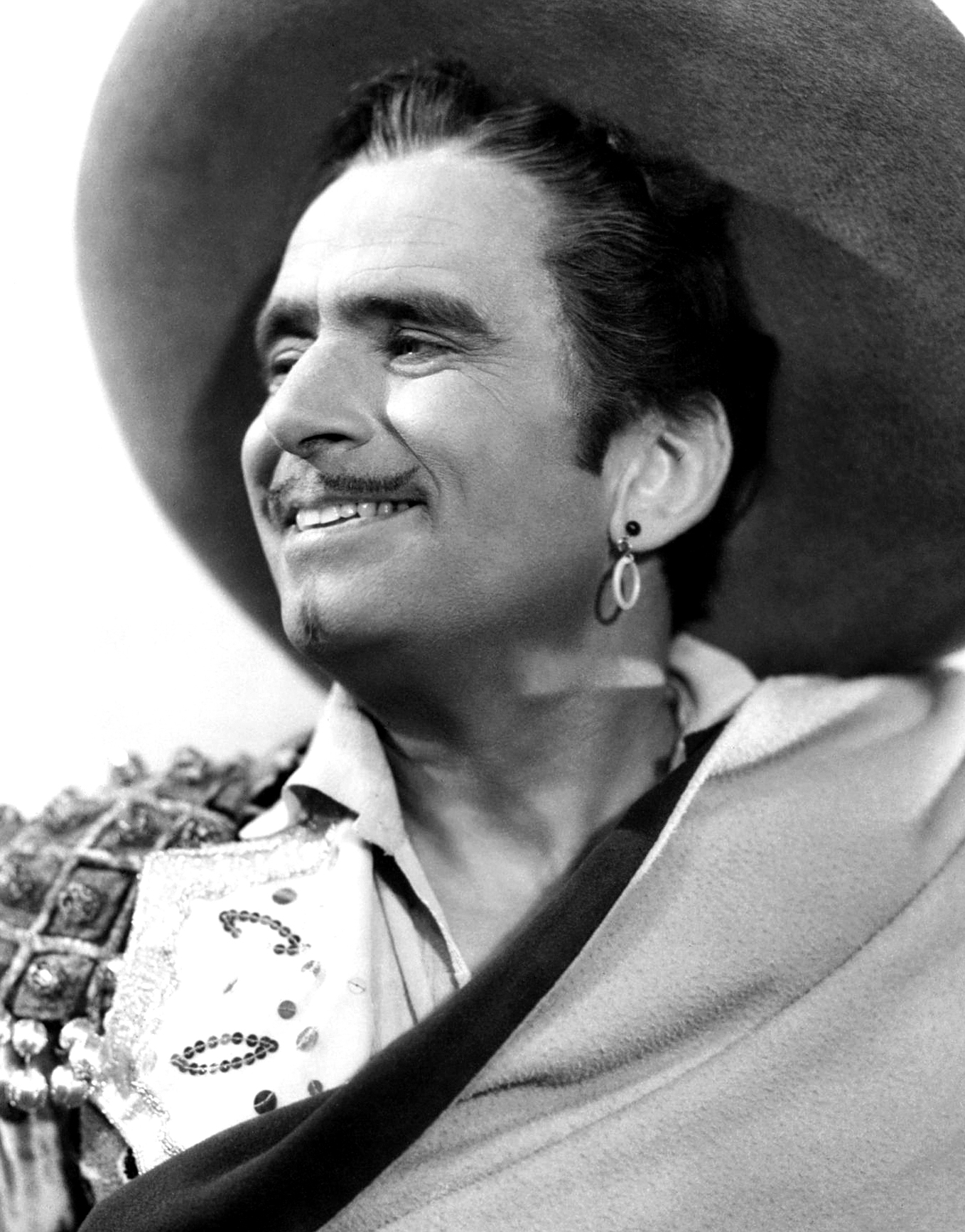
Douglas Fairbanks

- December 3 – Princess Louise, Duchess of Argyll, second youngest daughter of Queen Victoria (b. 1848)
- December 5 – Santiago Iglesias, Puerto Rican statesman (b. 1872)
- December 8 – Alimondo Ciampi, Italian sculptor (b. 1876)
- December 12 – Douglas Fairbanks, American actor, father of Douglas Fairbanks Jr. (b. 1883)
- December 14 – Helene Kröller-Müller, Dutch museum founder and art collector (b. 1869)
- December 16 – Juan Demóstenes Arosemena, 18th President of Panama (b. 1879)
- December 18 – Bruno Liljefors, Swedish artist (b. 1860)
- December 19
  - Dmitry Grave, Soviet mathematician (b. 1863)
  - Reginald F. Nicholson, United States Navy admiral (b. 1852)
- December 20 – Hans Langsdorff, German naval officer (suicide) (b. 1894)
- December 22 – Ma Rainey, African-American blues singer (b. 1886)
- December 23
  - Anthony Fokker, Dutch-born American aircraft manufacturer (b. 1890)
  - Maxime Laubeuf, French maritime engineer (b. 1864)
- December 24 – Walter Gordon, German physicist (b. 1893)
- December 25 – Ivan Dmitriyevich Borisov, Soviet aircraft pilot (b. 1913)
- December 27 – Rinaldo Cuneo, American artist ("the painter of San Francisco") (b. 1877)
- December 31 – Sir Frank Benson, British actor (b. 1858)

== Nobel Prizes ==

- Physics – Ernest Lawrence
- Chemistry – Adolf Friedrich Johann Butenandt, Leopold Ružička
- Physiology or Medicine – Gerhard Domagk
- Literature – Frans Eemil Sillanpää
- Peace – not awarded
