= Tazlău (river) =

River in Romania

- Location within Romania

Location
- Country: Romania
- Counties: Neamț, Bacău

Physical characteristics
- Source: Mount Goșman
  - location: Tarcău Mountains
  - coordinates: 46°43′09″N 26°16′01″E
  - elevation: 1,249 m (4,098 ft)
- Mouth: Trotuș
  - location: Onești
  - coordinates: 46°16′39″N 26°48′15″E
  - elevation: 184 m (604 ft)
- Length: 89 km (55 mi)
- Basin size: 1,104 km^{2} (426 sq mi)

Basin features
- Progression: Trotuș→ Siret→ Danube→ Black Sea
- Tributaries
  - right: Tazlăul Sărat

The Tazlău is a left tributary of the river Trotuș in Romania. Its source is in the Tarcău Mountains. It discharges into the Trotuș in Slobozia, near the city Onești. The Belci Dam, which failed in 1991, was built on the river Tazlău. The following villages are situated along the river Tazlău, from source to mouth: Tazlău, Frumoasa, Balcani, Ludași, Pârjol, Tărâța, Hemieni, Scorțeni, Tescani, Berești-Tazlău, Sănduleni, Livezi, Helegiu and Slobozia. Its length is 89 km (55 mi) and its basin size is 1,104 km^{2} (426 sq mi).

== Tributaries ==
The following rivers are tributaries to the river Tazlău (from source to mouth):

- Left: Frăsiniș, Сiunget, Rotăria, Preduș, Zăvoare, Vădurele, Brusturatul, Peștiosul, Racila, Boul, Sârbi, Nadișa, Răchitiș, Orășa, Valea Rea, Filipia, Bălăneasa, Helegiu, Văereni, Brătila, Belci
- Right: Pârâul Negru, Geamăna, Șoimi, Stuhi, Limpejioru, Slătioara, Frumoasa, Schit, Ludași, Cucuieți, Solonț, Tazlăul Sărat, Cernu, Berești, Strâmba, Moreni, Lupul, Bârsănești

== The Belci dam disaster ==
A dam and minor hydroelectric plant were set up on the Tazlau near Belci, a neighborhood of the town of Onesti.

In the early hours of the 29th of July 1991, an unusually large amount of rain fell that overwhelmed the dam and caused a breach and flooding up and down the river valley.

The final tally for the disaster was 31 people dead, over 2500 houses destroyed, over the whole river valley, over 7000 other houses flooded and more than 5000 animals dead. The village of Slobozia was nearly completely destroyed.

Investigations after the fact revealed that the studies of river flows in the area were rushed and incomplete, and that procedures for dealing with the situation were not observed because of various administrative mishaps.

As of this writing, the area of the powerplant lies abandoned and the river flows left of it, where the dam once stood.
