= Bârsănești (river) =

Bârsănești Chicera
- Location within Romania

Location
- Country: Romania
- Counties: Bacău County
- Villages: Bârsănești

Physical characteristics
- Source
  - coordinates: 46°21′11″N 26°37′40″E
  - elevation: 554 m (1,818 ft)
- Mouth: Tazlău
  - location: near Helegiu
  - coordinates: 46°19′40″N 26°44′56″E
  - elevation: 212 m (696 ft)
- Length: 13 km (8.1 mi)
- Basin size: 23 km^{2} (8.9 sq mi)

Basin features
- Progression: Tazlău→ Trotuș→ Siret→ Danube→ Black Sea

The Bârsănești (also: Chicera or Gura Văii) is a right tributary of the river Tazlău in Romania. Its length is 13 km (8.1 mi) and its basin size is 23 km^{2} (8.9 sq mi).
