= Lupul (Tazlău) =

- Location within Romania

Location
- Country: Romania
- Counties: Bacău County
- Villages: Albele, Poiana

Physical characteristics
- Mouth: Tazlău
  - location: Poiana
  - coordinates: 46°22′42″N 26°42′57″E
  - elevation: 230 m (750 ft)
- Length: 9 km (5.6 mi)
- Basin size: 17 km^{2} (6.6 sq mi)

Basin features
- Progression: Tazlău→ Trotuș→ Siret→ Danube→ Black Sea

The Lupul is a right tributary of the river Tazlău in Romania. It flows into the Tazlău in Poiana. Its length is 9 km (5.6 mi) and its basin size is 17 km^{2} (6.6 sq mi).
