= Solonț (river) =

- Location within Romania

Location
- Country: Romania
- Counties: Bacău County
- Villages: Solonț, Sărata, Băhnășeni, Tărâța

Physical characteristics
- Source: Tarcău Mountains
  - coordinates: 46°32′55″N 26°29′00″E
  - elevation: 588 m (1,929 ft)
- Mouth: Tazlău
  - location: Tărâța
  - coordinates: 46°33′53″N 26°37′28″E
  - elevation: 309 m (1,014 ft)
- Length: 14 km (8.7 mi)
- Basin size: 38 km^{2} (15 sq mi)

Basin features
- Progression: Tazlău→ Trotuș→ Siret→ Danube→ Black Sea

The Solonț is a right tributary of the river Tazlău in Romania. It discharges into the Tazlău in the village of Tărâța. Its length is 14 km (8.7 mi), and its drainage basin coves an area of 38 km^{2} (15 sq mi).
