= Orășa =

- Location within Romania

Location
- Country: Romania
- Counties: Bacău County
- Villages: Stufu, Orășa

Physical characteristics
- Mouth: Tazlău
  - coordinates: 46.4131°N 26.7284°E
- Length: 12 km (7.5 mi)
- Basin size: 31 km^{2} (12 sq mi)

Basin features
- Progression: Tazlău→ Trotuș→ Siret→ Danube→ Black Sea

The Orășa is a left tributary of the river Tazlău, in Romania. It flows into the Tazlău near Livezi. Its length is 12 km (7.5 mi) and its basin size is 31 km^{2} (12 sq mi).
