= Cucuieți (Tazlău) =

- Location within Romania

Location
- Country: Romania
- Counties: Bacău County
- Villages: Cucuieți, Bărnești, Pârjol

Physical characteristics
- Source: Mount Piatra Șoimului
  - location: Tarcău Mountains
  - coordinates: 46°36′12″N 26°28′15″E
  - elevation: 811 m (2,661 ft)
- Mouth: Tazlău
  - location: Pârjol
  - coordinates: 46°34′30″N 26°37′23″E
  - elevation: 311 m (1,020 ft)
- Length: 13 km (8.1 mi)
- Basin size: 27 km^{2} (10 sq mi)

Basin features
- Progression: Tazlău→ Trotuș→ Siret→ Danube→ Black Sea

The Cucuieți is a right tributary of the river Tazlău in Romania. It discharges into the Tazlău in Pârjol. Its length is 13 km (8.1 mi) and its basin size is 27 km^{2} (10 sq mi).
