= Boul (Tazlău) =

- Location within Romania

Location
- Country: Romania
- Counties: Bacău County
- Villages: Grigoreni, Scorțeni

Physical characteristics
- Source: Dulap Hill
  - coordinates: 46°37′10″N 26°40′26″E
  - elevation: 407 m (1,335 ft)
- Mouth: Tazlău
  - location: Downstream of Scorțeni
  - coordinates: 46°32′01″N 26°39′47″E
  - elevation: 290 m (950 ft)
- Length: 12 km (7.5 mi)
- Basin size: 24 km^{2} (9.3 sq mi)

Basin features
- Progression: Tazlău→ Trotuș→ Siret→ Danube→ Black Sea

The Boul is a left tributary of the river Tazlău in Romania. It discharges into the Tazlău near Scorțeni. Its length is 12 km (7.5 mi) and its basin size is 24 km^{2} (9.3 sq mi).
