= Moreni (river) =

- Location within Romania

Location
- Country: Romania
- Counties: Bacău County
- Villages: Dragomir, Berzunți, Scăriga

Physical characteristics
- Source
  - coordinates: 46°24′54″N 26°36′41″E
- Mouth: Tazlău
  - location: Scăriga
  - coordinates: 46°23′15″N 26°42′38″E
  - elevation: 233 m (764 ft)
- Length: 12 km (7.5 mi)
- Basin size: 53 km^{2} (20 sq mi)

Basin features
- Progression: Tazlău→ Trotuș→ Siret→ Danube→ Black Sea
- Tributaries
  - left: Berzunți
  - right: Butucari

The Moreni is a right tributary of the river Tazlău in Romania. It discharges into the Tazlău in Scăriga. Its length is 12 km (7.5 mi) and its basin size is 53 km^{2} (20 sq mi).
