= Frumoasa-Tazlău mine =

Potash mine in Bacău County, Romania

- Location: Balcani, Bacău County, Romania
- Products: Potash

The Frumoasa-Tazlău mine is a large potash mine located in eastern Romania in Bacău County, close to Balcani. Frumoasa-Tazlău represents one of the largest potash reserves in Romania having estimated reserves of 200 million tonnes of ore grading 10% potassium chloride metal.
