= Cernu =

- Location within Romania

Location
- Country: Romania
- Counties: Bacău County
- Villages: Cernu, Românești

Physical characteristics
- Source: Bulimandru Hill
  - location: Berzunți Mountains
  - coordinates: 46°24′42″N 26°34′42″E
  - elevation: 682 m (2,238 ft)
- Mouth: Tazlău
  - location: Românești
  - coordinates: 46°29′31″N 26°40′42″E
  - elevation: 274 m (899 ft)
- Length: 16 km (9.9 mi)
- Basin size: 65 km^{2} (25 sq mi)

Basin features
- Progression: Tazlău→ Trotuș→ Siret→ Danube→ Black Sea
- Tributaries
  - right: Păltiniș, Buda

The Cernu is a right tributary of the river Tazlău in Romania. It discharges into the Tazlău in Românești. Its length is 16 km (9.9 mi) and its basin size is 65 km^{2} (25 sq mi).
