= Răchitiș (Tazlău) =

- Location within Romania

Location
- Country: Romania
- Counties: Bacău County

Physical characteristics
- Mouth: Tazlău
  - coordinates: 46°26′06″N 26°43′22″E
  - elevation: 251 m (823 ft)
- Length: 18 km (11 mi)
- Basin size: 55 km^{2} (21 sq mi)

Basin features
- Progression: Tazlău→ Trotuș→ Siret→ Danube→ Black Sea
- Tributaries
  - left: Turlui

The Răchitiș is a left tributary of the river Tazlău in Romania. It discharges into the Tazlău in Sănduleni. Its length is 18 km (11 mi) and its basin size is 55 km^{2} (21 sq mi).
