= Schitu =

Schitu or Schit may refer to several places in Romania:

- Schitu, Giurgiu, a commune in Giurgiu County
- Schitu, Olt, a commune in Olt County
- Schitu Duca, a commune in Iași County
- Schitu Golești, a commune in Argeș County
- Schitu, a village in Costinești Commune, Constanța County
- Schitu, a village in Braloștița Commune, Dolj County
- Schitu, a village in Bogdănița Commune, Vaslui County
- Schitu, a village in Nicolae Bălcescu Commune, Vâlcea County
- Schitu Deleni, a village in Teslui Commune, Olt County
- Schitu din Deal and Schitu din Vale, villages in Pleșoiu Commune, Olt County
- Schitu Frumoasa, a village in Balcani Commune, Bacău County
- Schitu Hadâmbului, a village in Mironeasa Commune, Iași County
- Schitu-Matei, a village in Ciofrângeni Commune, Argeș County
- Schitu Poienari, a village in Vitănești Commune, Teleorman County
- Schitu Scoiceşti, a village in Leordeni Commune, Argeș County
- Schitu Stavnic, a village in Voinești Commune, Iași County
- Schitu Tarcău, a village in Tarcău Commune, Neamț County
- Schitu Topolniţei, a village in Izvoru Bârzii Commune, Mehedinți County
- Schit-Orăşeni, a village in Cristești Commune, Botoșani County
- Schit (Bistrița), a tributary of the river Bistrița in Neamț County
- Schit (Tazlău), a tributary of the river Tazlău in Bacău County
