= Chetriș =

Chetriș may refer to:

- Chetriș, a village in Tamași Commune, Bacău County, Romania
- Chetriș, a village in Călinești, Fălești, Moldova
