= Strugar =

Strugar is a surname. Notable people with the surname include:

- George Strugar (1934–1997), American football player
- Ivan Strugar (born 1974), Montenegrin kickboxer
- Pavle Strugar (born 1933), Montenegrin general
- Petar Strugar (born 1988), Montenegrin actor
- Rajko Strugar (born 1995), Montenegrin volleyball player
- Teona Strugar Mitevska (born 1974), Macedonian film director
- Vlado Strugar (1922–2019), Serbian historian

== See also ==
- Strugari, Bacău, commune in Bacău County, Romania
