= Verșești =

Verșești may refer to several places in Romania:

- Verșești, a village in Sănduleni Commune, Bacău County
- Verșești, a village in Girov Commune, Neamț County
