= Pușcașu =

Pușcașu may refer to

- Pușcașu, a village in Corcova, Romania
- Pușcașu River in Romania
- Vasile Pușcașu (born 1956), Romanian wrestler
