= Prăjești (disambiguation) =

Prăjești may refer to several villages in Romania:

- Prăjești, a commune in Bacău County
- Prăjești, a village in Măgirești Commune, Bacău County
- Prăjești, a village in Secuieni Commune, Neamț County
