= Orbeni =

- Commune
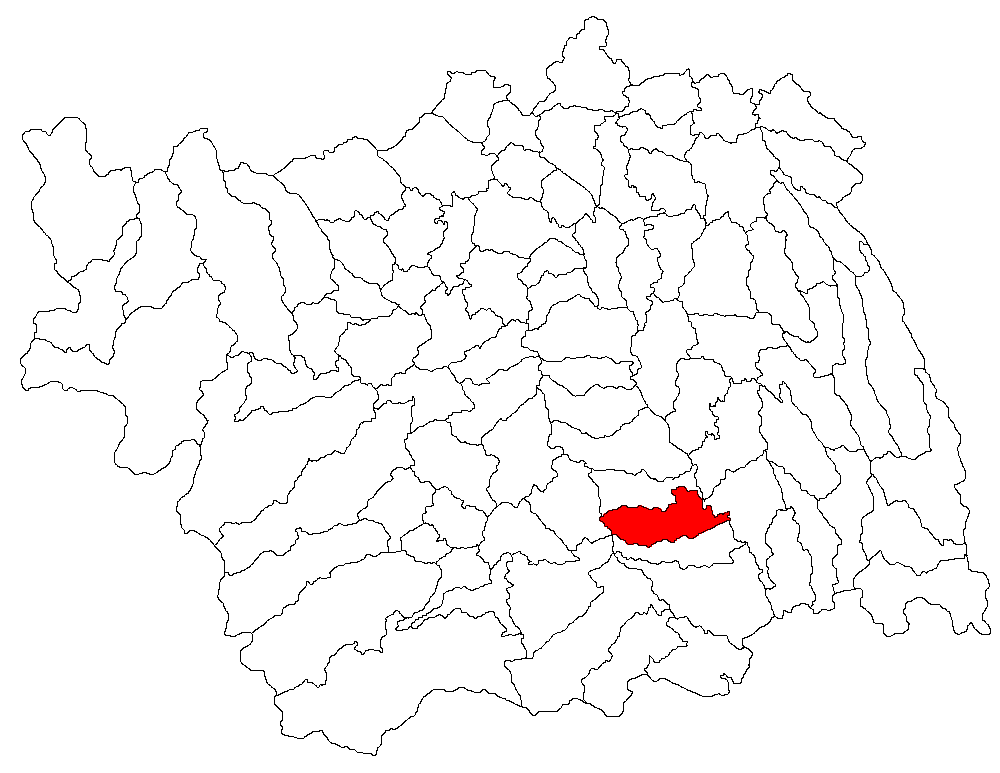
- Location in Bacău County

- Location in Romania
- Coordinates: 46°17′N 27°1′E
- Country: Romania
- County: Bacău

Government
  - Mayor (2020–2024): Costache Popa (PSD)
- Area: 57.11 km^{2} (22.05 sq mi)
- Elevation: 228 m (748 ft)
- Population (2021-12-01): 3,605
  - Density: 63.12/km^{2} (163.5/sq mi)
- Time zone: UTC+02:00 (EET)
  - Summer (DST): UTC+03:00 (EEST)
- Postal code: 607385
- Area code: +(40) 234
- Vehicle reg.: BC
- Website: www.primariaorbeni.ro

Orbeni is a commune in Bacău County, Western Moldavia, Romania. It is composed of two villages, Orbeni and Scurta.

== Geography ==
The commune is located in the south-central part of the county, 39 km (24 mi) south of the county seat, Bacău. It is situated in the Pietricica Ridge of the Subcarpathian Plateau, an area of hills covered with forests of beech, oak, maple, acacia, and more recently fir and spruce trees. The Siret River and its valley lie to the east.

It neighbours four other communes: Parava to the north, Gura Văii to the west, Valea Seacă to the south, and Corbasca to the east.

Orbeni is crossed by the DN2 road, which connects Bacău to Focșani and forms part of the European route E85. On the eastern side of the commune is the Orbeni railway station, serving the Căile Ferate Române Line 500 that runs from Bucharest to Focșani, Bacău, and on north toward the Ukrainian border.

== History ==
Legend has it that a woman who was almost blind ("oarba" in Romanian), head of a large family from the settlement "Rădăciei's mouth" and "Dacian's head", took her family and migrated through the valley of a river towards the Ciortolom's peak.

The Oarba family members have cut down the forests to build houses, for cattle breeding and for agriculture.

The descendants of this woman took her name calling themselves the followers of Oarba, and residents of neighbouring villages called them Orbenari. The creek crossing the valley received the name of those who possessed it – Orbenarilor Creek.
