= Scurta =

Scurta may refer to several villages in Romania:

- Scurta, a village in Orbeni Commune, Bacău County
- Scurta, a village in Pogăceaua Commune, Mureș County
