= Schit (Tazlău) =

- Location within Romania

Location
- Country: Romania
- Counties: Bacău County
- Villages: Schitu Frumoasa, Balcani

Physical characteristics
- Source: Mount Bâtca Rugilor
  - location: Tarcău Mountains
  - coordinates: 46°38′56″N 26°23′56″E
  - elevation: 878 m (2,881 ft)
- Mouth: Tazlău
  - location: Balcani
  - coordinates: 46°38′12″N 26°33′47″E
  - elevation: 347 m (1,138 ft)
- Length: 12 km (7.5 mi)
- Basin size: 63 km^{2} (24 sq mi)

Basin features
- Progression: Tazlău→ Trotuș→ Siret→ Danube→ Black Sea
- Tributaries
  - right: Coman

The Schit is a right tributary of the river Tazlău in Romania. It discharges into the Tazlău in Balcani. Its length is 12 km (7.5 mi) and its basin size is 63 km^{2} (24 sq mi).
