= Lidia Drăgănescu =

Romanian handball player (born 1967)

Personal information
- Nationality: Romanian
- Born: 24 October 1967 (age 58) Chetriș, Romania
- Height: 1.79 m (5 ft 10 in)

Sport
- Sport: Handball
- Position: Left back
- Current club: Retired

Youth career
- Years: Team
- 1982–1985: CSȘ Bacău

Senior clubs
- Years: Team
- 1985–1992: Știința Bacău
- 1992-1994: Chimistul Râmnicu Vâlcea
- 1995-1998: Borussia Dortmund
- 1998-1999: Fibrexnylon Săvinești
- 1999-2001: EOS Siracusa
- 2000-2001: Fibrexnylon Săvinești
National team
Years	Team	Apps	(Gls)
1984-2000	Romania	206	(658)

Lidia Drăgănescu (née Butnărașu; born 24 October 1967) is a Romanian former handballer who played as a left back for the Romanian national team.

== Achievements ==
- Liga Națională:
  - Winner (5): 1986, 1987, 1992, 1993, 1994
  - Silver Medalist: 1988, 1990, 1991
- Cupa României:
  - Winner (4): 1986, 1989, 1993, 1994
- European Champions Cup:
  - Finalist: 1986
  - Semifinalist: 1987
- EHF Cup:
  - Winner (1): 1989
  - Semifinalist: 1993, 1998
- DHB-Pokal:
  - Winner (1): 1997
- Serie A1:
  - Winner (1): 2000
