= Slănic-Moldova =

- Town
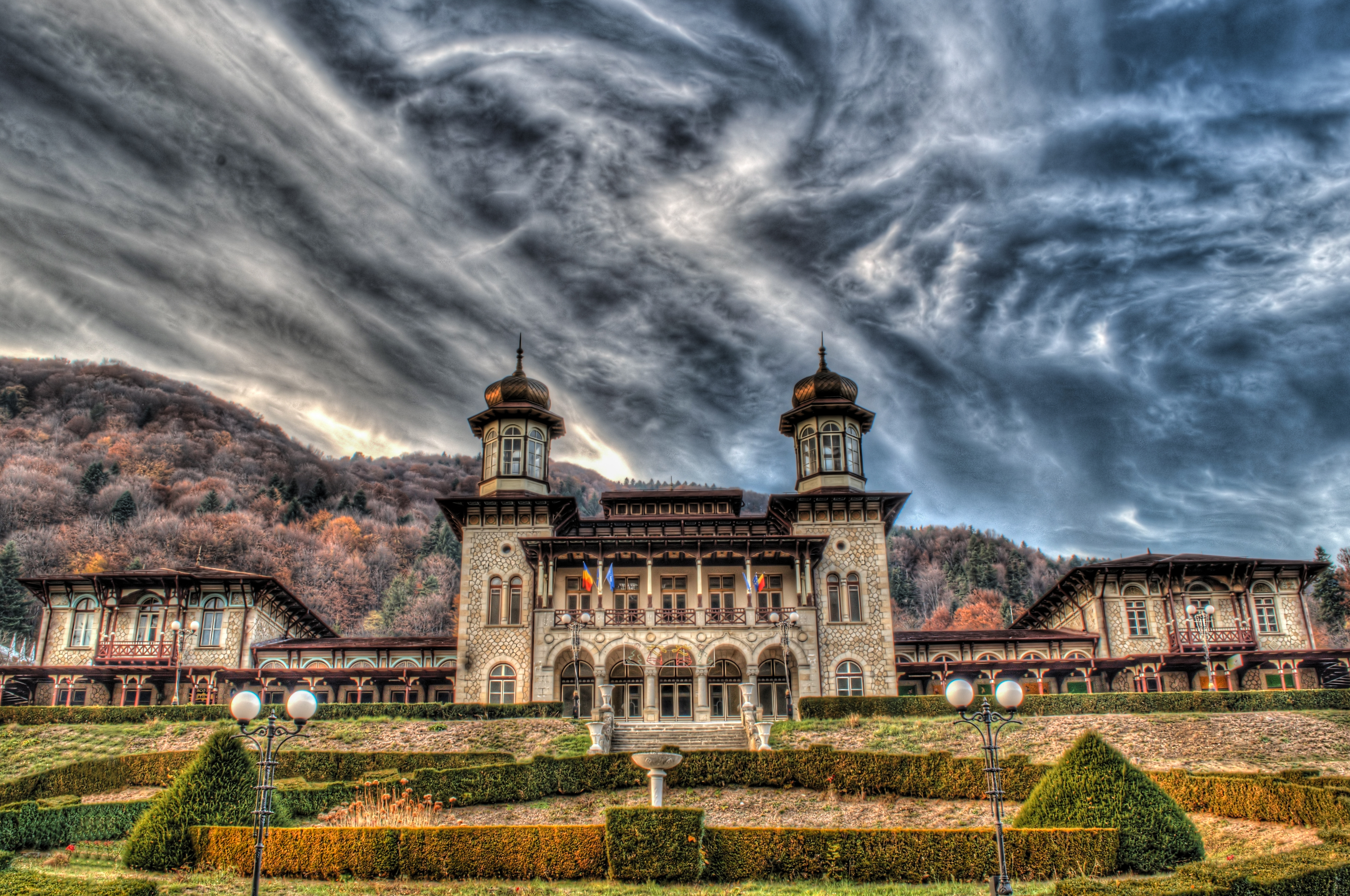
- The Slănic-Moldova Casino

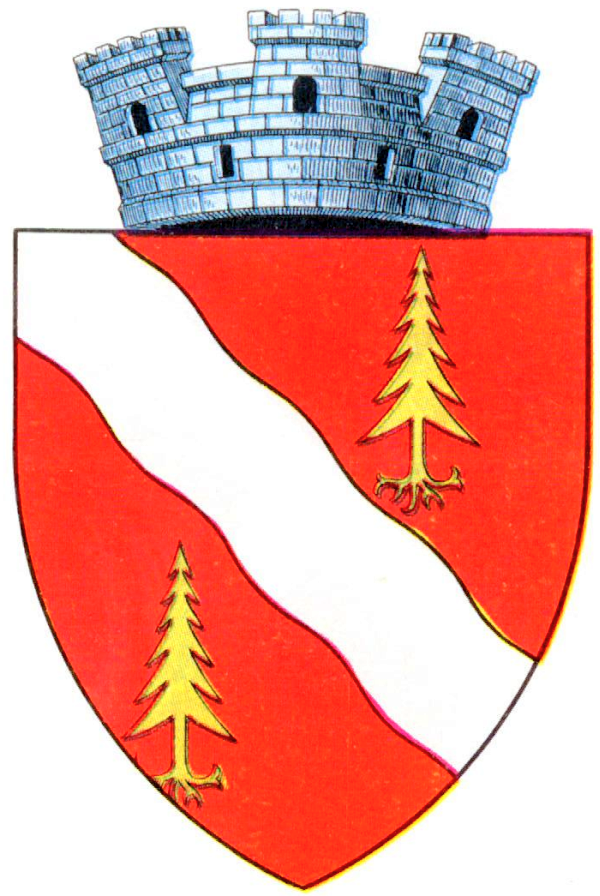
- Coat of arms

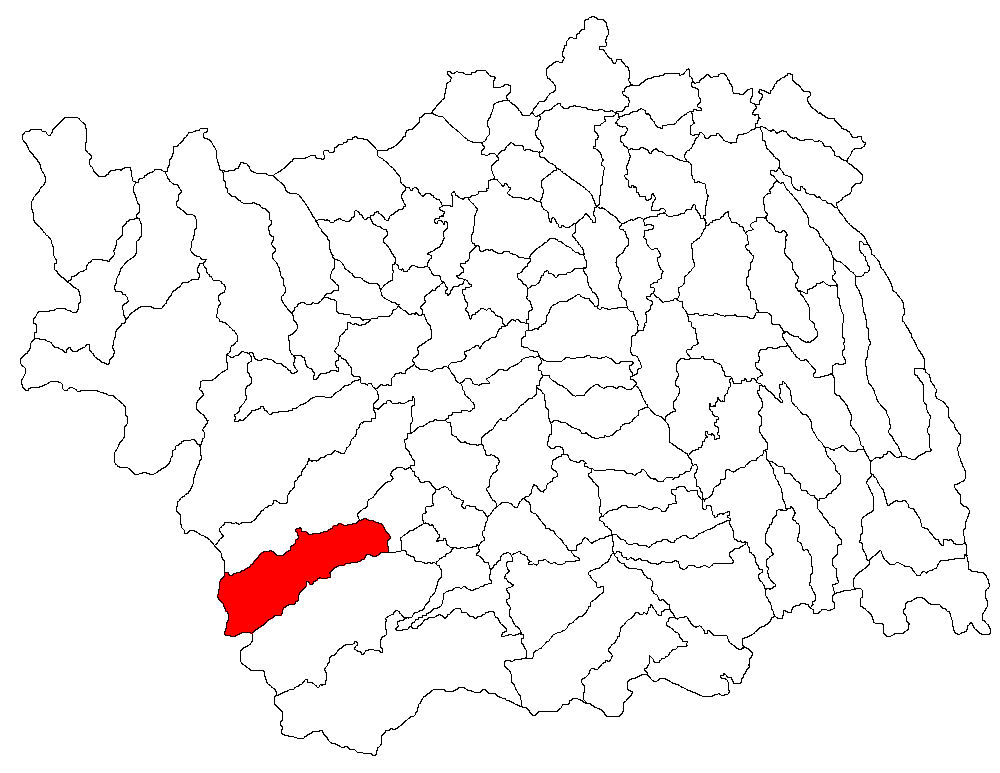
- Location of Slănic-Moldova in Bacău County

- Location in Romania
- Coordinates: 46°12′25″N 26°25′50″E
- Country: Romania
- County: Bacău
- Subdivisions: Cerdac, Cireșoaia

Government
  - Mayor (2024–2028): Benone Moraru (PSD)
- Area: 114.13 km^{2} (44.07 sq mi)
- Elevation: 530 m (1,740 ft)
- Population (2021-12-01): 4,011
  - Density: 35.14/km^{2} (91.02/sq mi)
- Time zone: UTC+02:00 (EET)
  - Summer (DST): UTC+03:00 (EEST)
- Postal code: 605500
- Area code: (+40) 02 34
- Vehicle reg.: BC
- Website: primariaslanicmoldova.ro

Slănic-Moldova, formerly Băile Slănic, is a town and a spa resort in Bacău County, Romania. The town administers two villages: Cerdac and Cireșoaia.

Historical population
Year	Pop.	±%
1948	2,157	—
1956	3,082	+42.9%
1966	4,857	+57.6%
1977	4,734	−2.5%
1992	5,311	+12.2%
2002	5,375	+1.2%
2011	4,198	−21.9%
2021	4,011	−4.5%
Source: Census data

== Gallery ==
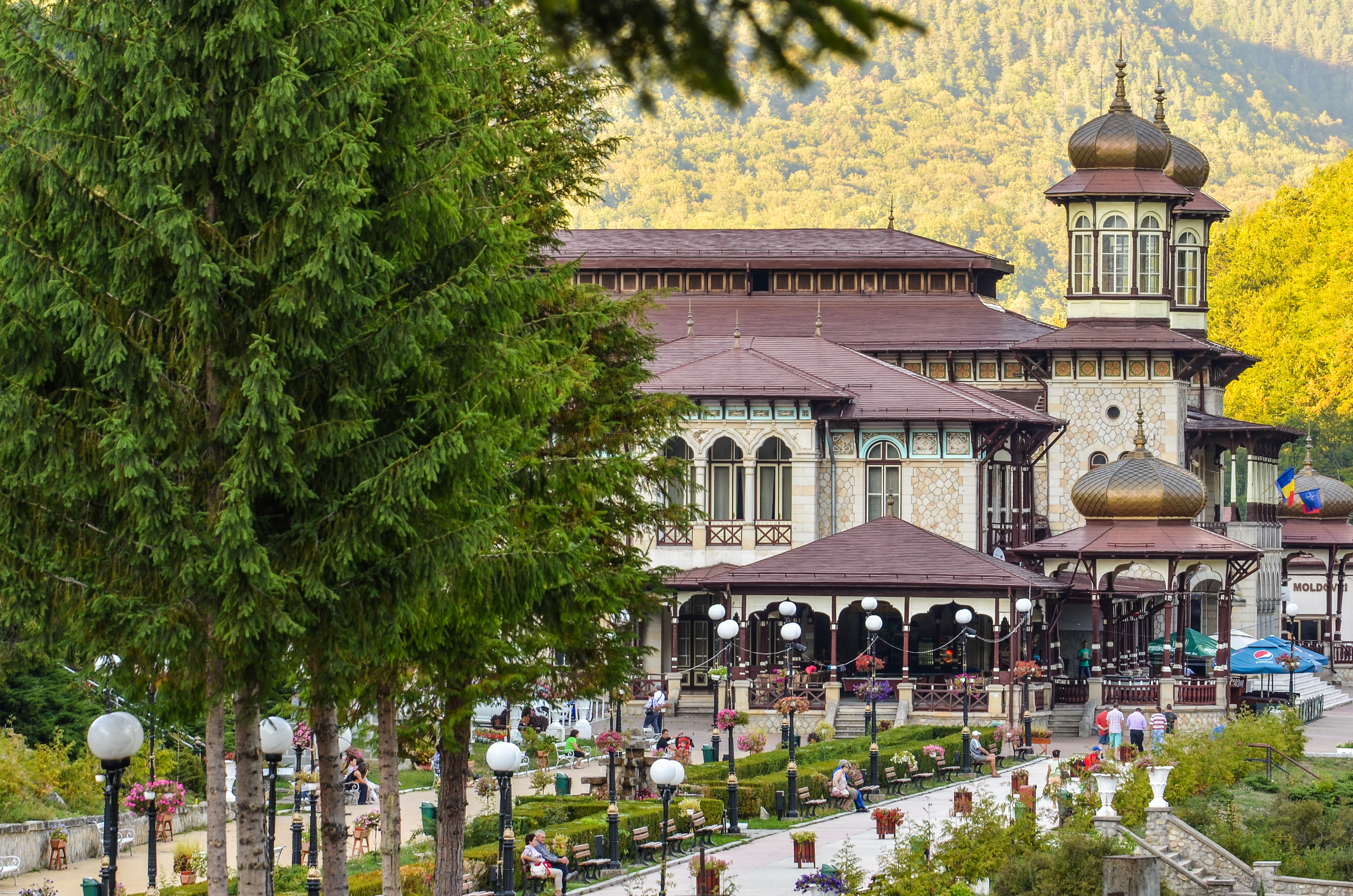
Park in the town centre

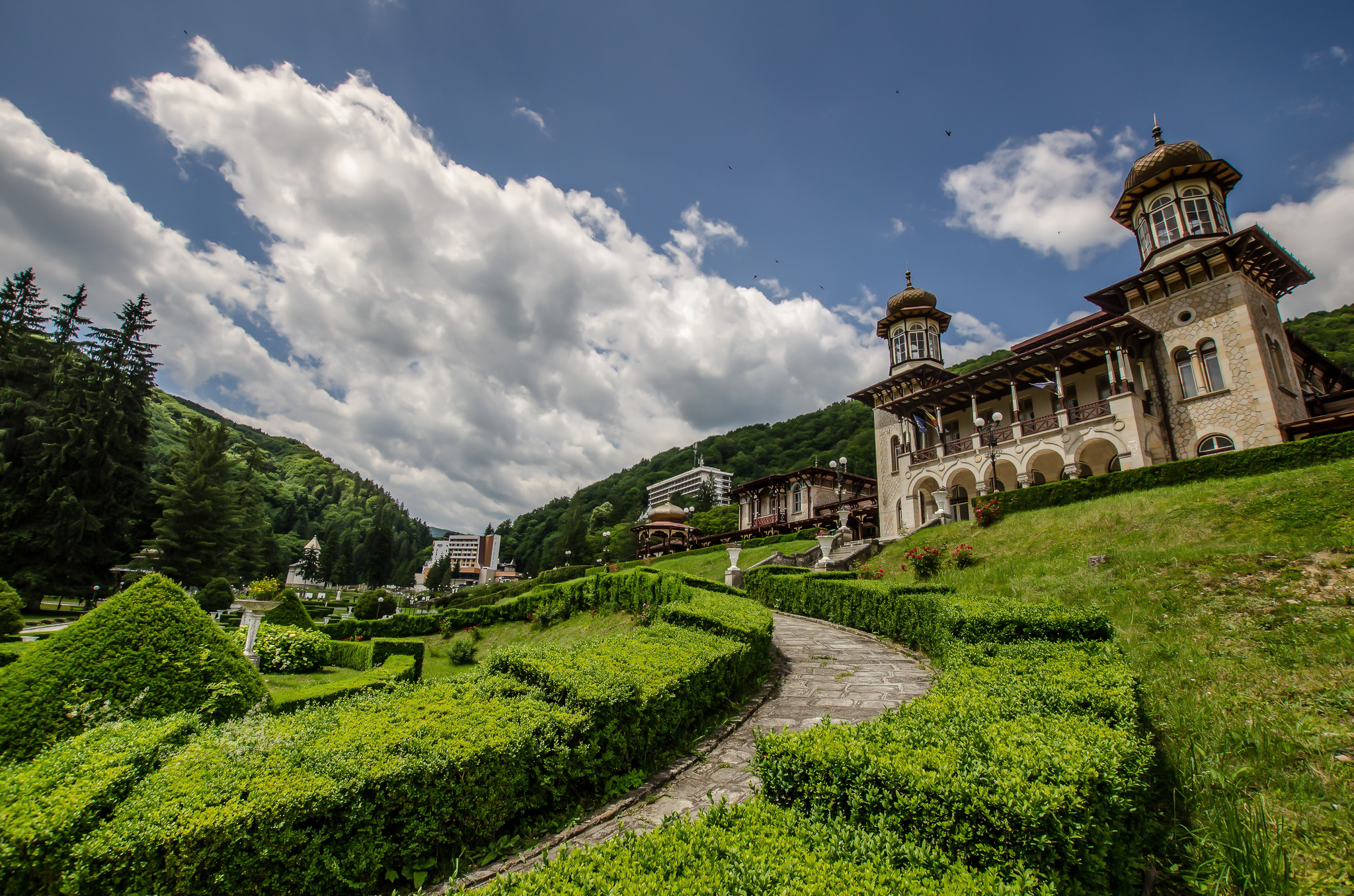
The casino
