= Gioseni =

- Commune
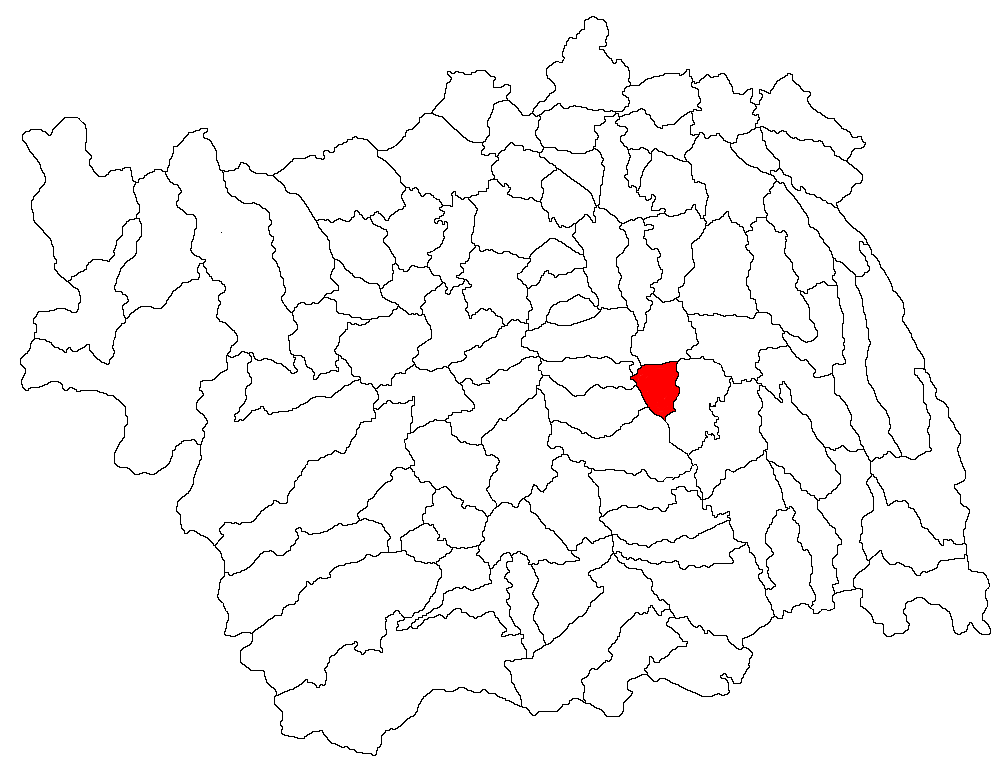
- Location in Bacău County

- Location in Romania
- Coordinates: 46°26′N 26°59′E
- Country: Romania
- County: Bacău

Government
  - Mayor (2024–2028): Bernadin Tamaș (PSD)
- Area: 13 km^{2} (5.0 sq mi)
- Elevation: 141 m (463 ft)
- Population (2021-12-01): 3,427
  - Density: 260/km^{2} (680/sq mi)
- Time zone: UTC+02:00 (EET)
  - Summer (DST): UTC+03:00 (EEST)
- Postal code: 607618
- Area code: +(40) 0234
- Vehicle reg.: BC
- Website: comunagioseni.ro

Gioseni is a commune in Bacău County, Western Moldavia, Romania. It is composed of a single village, Gioseni. It was part of Tamași Commune until 2005, when it was split off.
