= Pârgărești =

- Commune

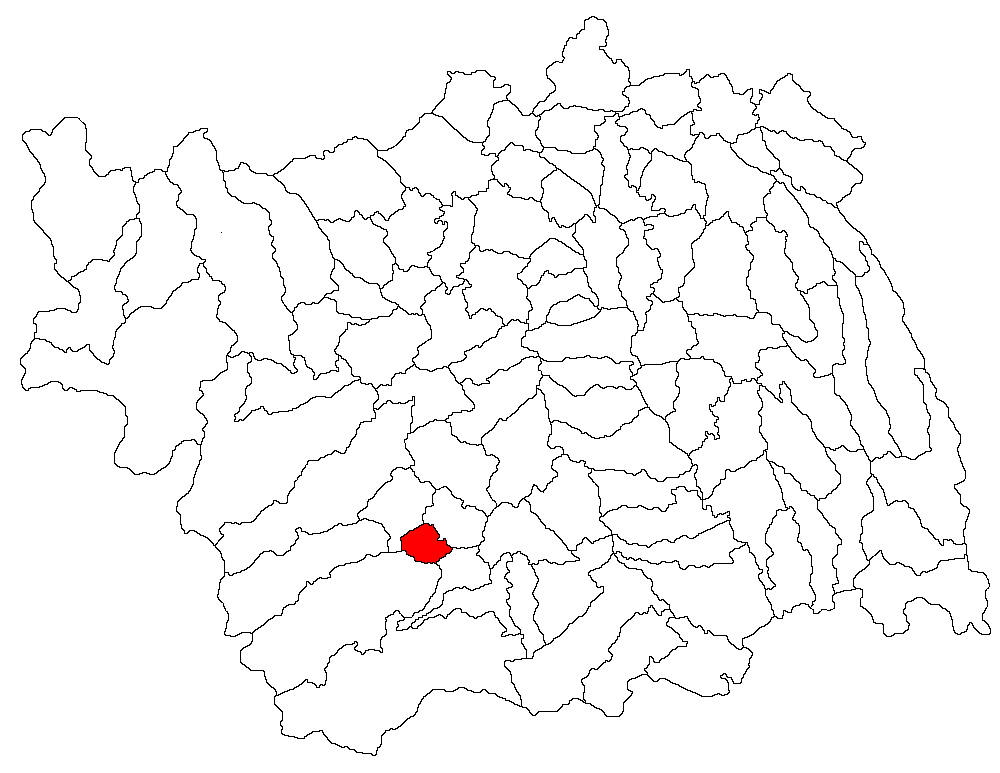
- Location in Bacău County

- Location in Romania
- Coordinates: 46°15′N 26°39′E
- Country: Romania
- County: Bacău

Government
  - Mayor (2024–2028): Corneliu Alexe (PSD)
- Area: 21.32 km^{2} (8.23 sq mi)
- Elevation: 300 m (980 ft)
- Population (2021-12-01): 3,790
  - Density: 178/km^{2} (460/sq mi)
- Time zone: UTC+02:00 (EET)
  - Summer (DST): UTC+03:00 (EEST)
- Postal code: 607425
- Area code: +(40) 0234
- Vehicle reg.: BC
- Website: comunapargaresti.ro

Pârgărești is a commune in Bacău County, Western Moldavia, Romania. It is composed of five villages: Bahna, Nicorești, Pârâu Boghii, Pârgărești, and Satu Nou.
