= Roșiori, Bacău =

Roșiori
- Commune
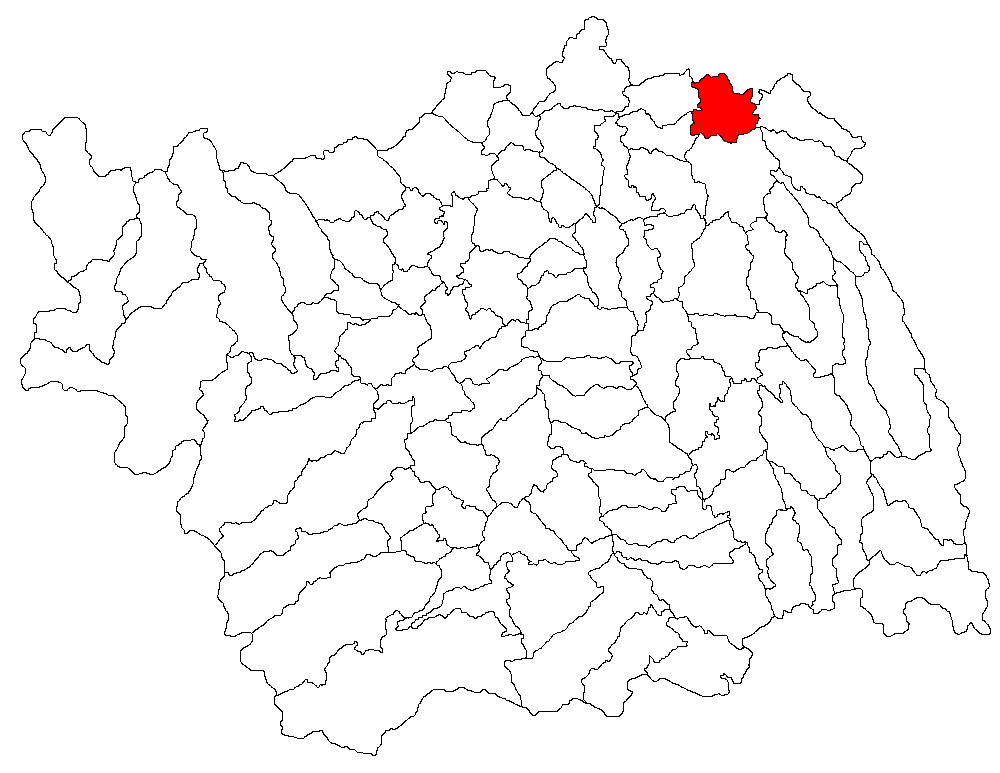
- Location in Bacău County

- Location in Romania
- Coordinates: 46.7262°N 27.0854°E
- Country: Romania
- County: Bacău

Government
  - Mayor (2024–2028): Ionel Petraru (PSD)
- Area: 46.58 km^{2} (17.98 sq mi)
- Elevation: 276 m (906 ft)
- Population (2021-12-01): 2,006
  - Density: 43.07/km^{2} (111.5/sq mi)
- Time zone: UTC+02:00 (EET)
  - Summer (DST): UTC+03:00 (EEST)
- Postal code: 607510
- Area code: +(40) 0234
- Vehicle reg.: BC
- Website: comunarosiori.ro

Roșiori is a commune in Bacău County, Western Moldavia, Romania. It is composed of six villages: Misihănești, Negușeni, Poieni, Roșiori, Valea Mare, and Valea Mică.
