= Traian, Bacău =

Traian
- Commune
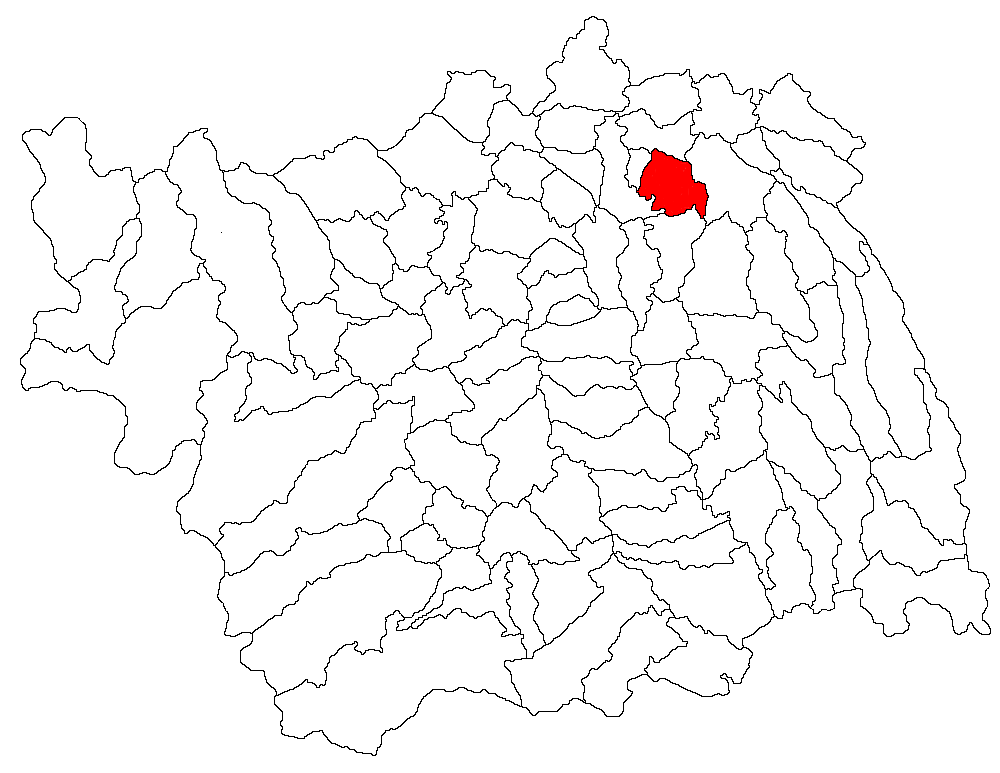
- Location in Bacău County

- Location in Romania
- Coordinates: 46°38′N 27°2′E
- Country: Romania
- County: Bacău

Government
  - Mayor (2024–2028): Sorin Gherghelucă (PNL)
- Area: 35.78 km^{2} (13.81 sq mi)
- Elevation: 177 m (581 ft)
- Population (2021-12-01): 2,512
  - Density: 70.21/km^{2} (181.8/sq mi)
- Time zone: UTC+02:00 (EET)
  - Summer (DST): UTC+03:00 (EEST)
- Postal code: 607635
- Area code: +(40) 0234
- Vehicle reg.: BC
- Website: primariatraianbacau.ro

Traian is a commune in Bacău County, Western Moldavia, Romania. It is composed of five villages: Bogdănești, Hertioana de Jos, Hertioana-Răzeși, Traian, and Zăpodia. It also included the village of Prăjești until 2005, when it was split off to form a separate commune.
