= Prăjești =

- Commune
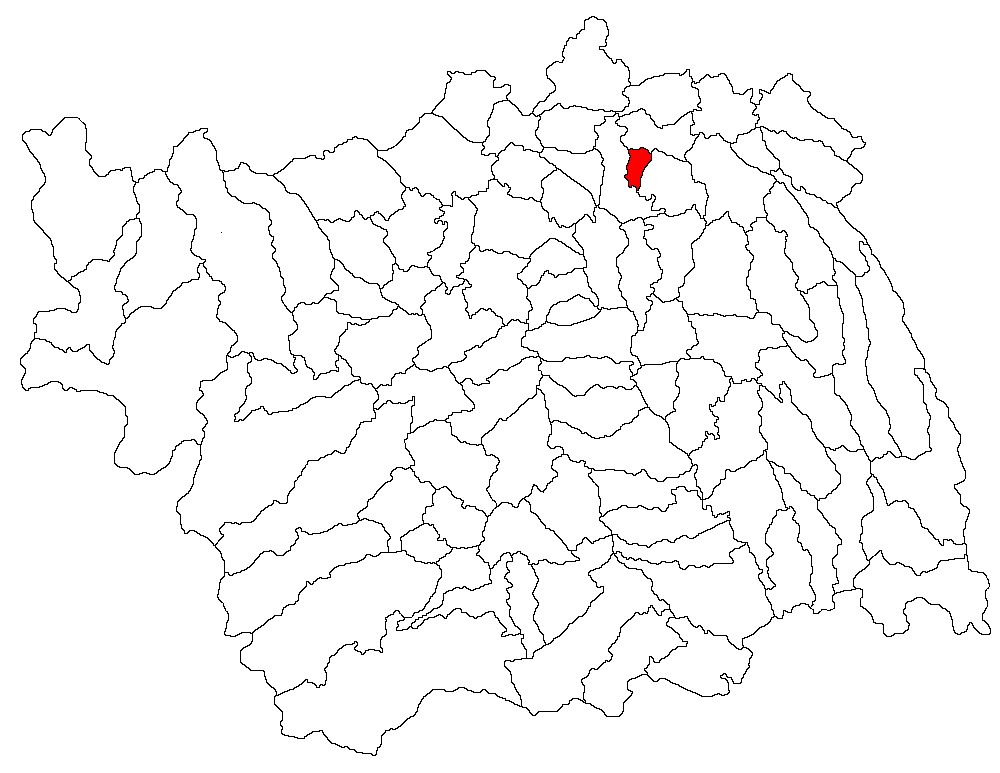
- Location in Bacău County

- Location in Romania
- Coordinates: 46.6529°N 26.9853°E
- Country: Romania
- County: Bacău

Government
  - Mayor (2024–2028): Damian Comorașu (PNL)
- Area: 19.84 km^{2} (7.66 sq mi)
- Elevation: 179 m (587 ft)
- Population (2021-12-01): 2,132
  - Density: 107.5/km^{2} (278.3/sq mi)
- Time zone: UTC+02:00 (EET)
  - Summer (DST): UTC+03:00 (EEST)
- Postal code: 607639
- Area code: +(40) 234
- Vehicle reg.: BC
- Website: primariaprajesti.ro

Prăjești is a commune in Bacău County, Western Moldavia, Romania. It is composed of a single village, Prăjești. It was part of Traian Commune until 2005, when it was split off as a separate commune.

== Natives ==
- Ernest Maftei (1920–2006), film actor
