= Tamași =

- Commune
- Chetriș village

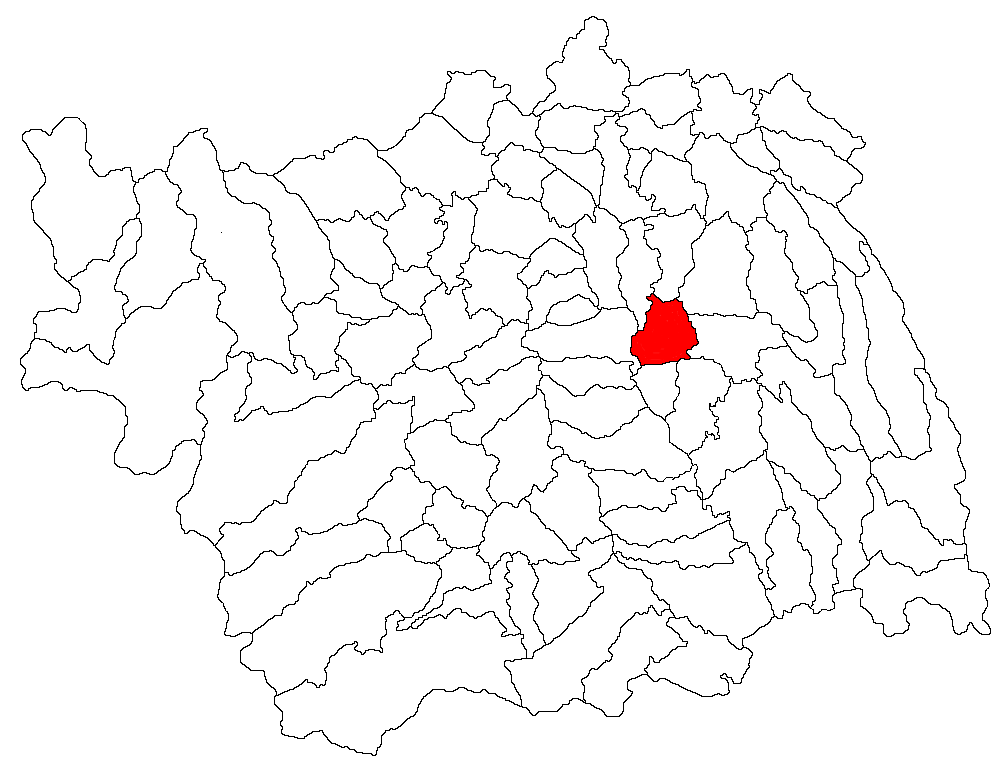
- Location in Bacău County

- Location in Romania
- Coordinates: 46°29′N 26°59′E
- Country: Romania
- County: Bacău

Government
  - Mayor (2024–2028): Veronica Donțu (PSD)
- Area: 46.43 km^{2} (17.93 sq mi)
- Elevation: 223 m (732 ft)
- Population (2021-12-01): 2,885
  - Density: 62.14/km^{2} (160.9/sq mi)
- Time zone: UTC+02:00 (EET)
  - Summer (DST): UTC+03:00 (EEST)
- Postal code: 607615
- Area code: +(40) 0234
- Vehicle reg.: BC
- Website: comunatamasi.ro

Tamași (Hungarian: Tamás) is a commune in Bacău County, Western Moldavia, Romania. It is composed of three villages: Chetriș (Ketris), Furnicari (Furnikár), and Tamași. It included the village of Gioseni until 2005, when it was split off to form a separate commune.

== Natives ==
- Lidia Drăgănescu (born 1967), handballer
