= Parava, Bacău =

Parava
- Commune
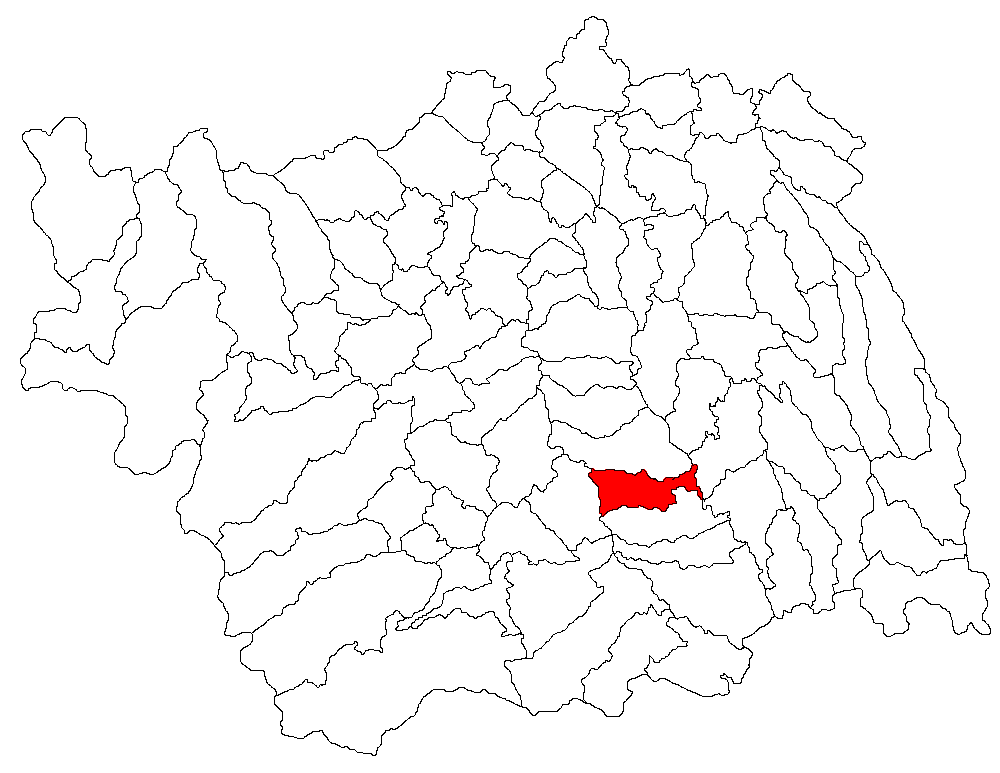
- Location in Bacău County

- Location in Romania
- Coordinates: 46°18′N 27°00′E
- Country: Romania
- County: Bacău

Government
  - Mayor (2020–2024): Costel Dediu (PSD)
- Area: 45.36 km^{2} (17.51 sq mi)
- Elevation: 166 m (545 ft)
- Population (2021-12-01): 3,267
  - Density: 72.02/km^{2} (186.5/sq mi)
- Time zone: UTC+02:00 (EET)
  - Summer (DST): UTC+03:00 (EEST)
- Postal code: 607395
- Area code: +(40) 0234
- Vehicle reg.: BC
- Website: primariaparava.ro

Parava is a commune in Bacău County, Western Moldavia, Romania. It is composed of four villages: Drăgușani, Parava, Rădoaia, and Teiuș.

At the 2002 census, the commune had 3,393 inhabitants, of which 79.5% were ethnic Romanians and 20.4% Roma; 98.4% were Romanian Orthodox and 1.2% Seventh-day Adventist. At the 2021 census, Parava had a population of 3,267; of those, 60.02% were Romanians and 34.22% Roma.
