= Gura Văii, Bacău =

Gura Văii
- Commune
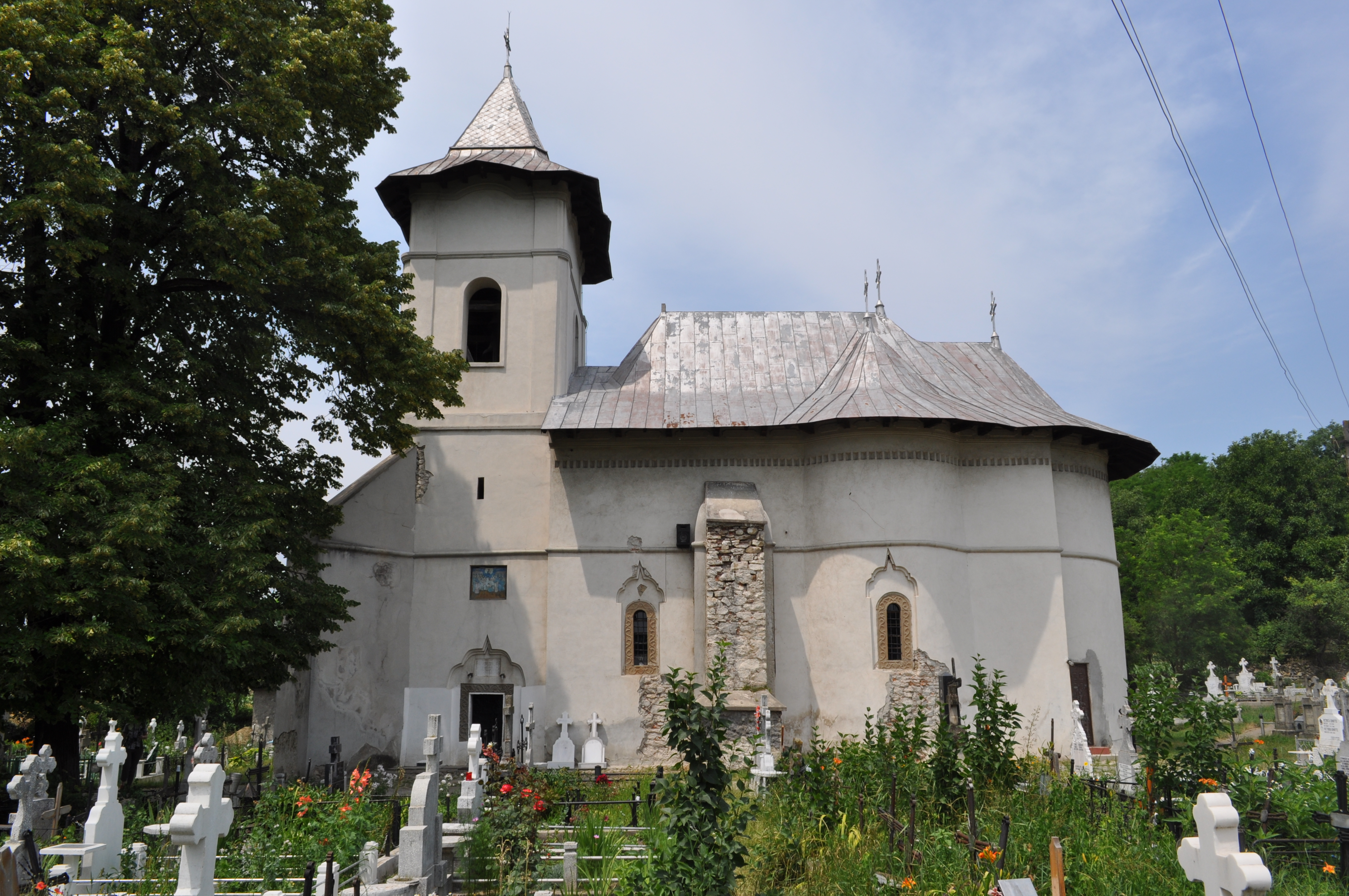
- Church of the Assumption in Gura Văii

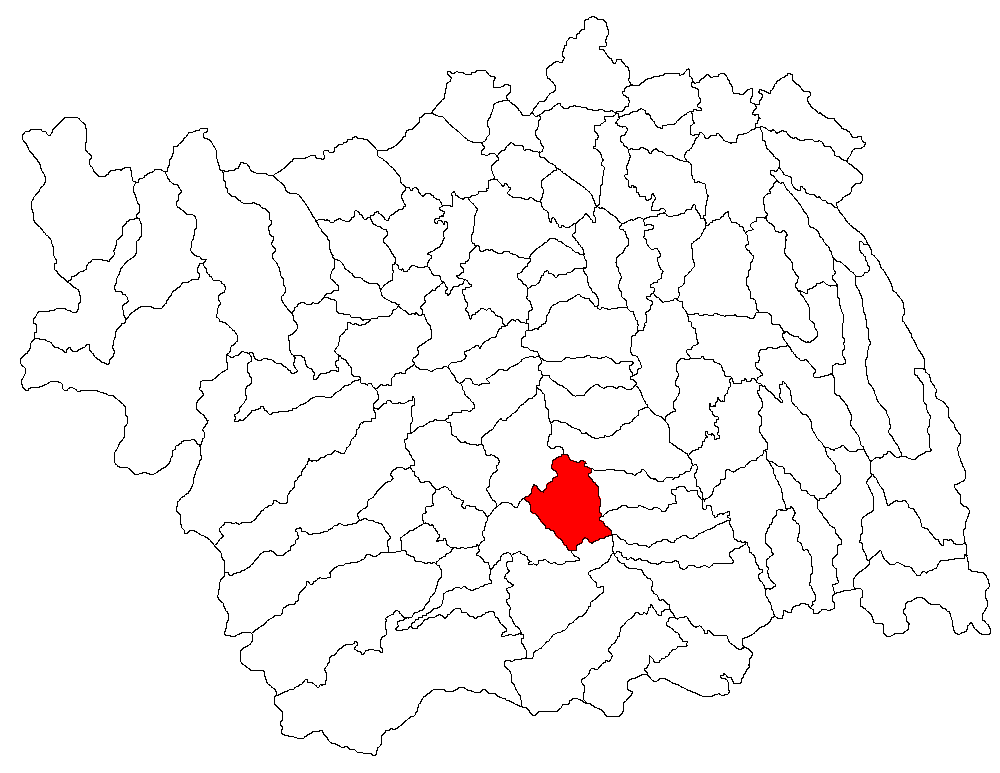
- Location in Bacău County

- Location in Romania
- Coordinates: 46°16′N 26°50′E
- Country: Romania
- County: Bacău

Government
  - Mayor (2024–2028): Silviu Tinei (PSD)
- Area: 70.1 km^{2} (27.1 sq mi)
- Elevation: 195 m (640 ft)
- Population (2021-12-01): 4,221
  - Density: 60.2/km^{2} (156/sq mi)
- Time zone: UTC+02:00 (EET)
  - Summer (DST): UTC+03:00 (EEST)
- Postal code: 607220
- Area code: +(40) 0234
- Vehicle reg.: BC
- Website: uatcomunaguravaii.ro

Gura Văii is a commune in Bacău County, Western Moldavia, Romania. It is composed of six villages: Capăta, Dumbrava, Gura Văii, Motocești, Păltinata, and Temelia.
