= Berzunți =

- Commune
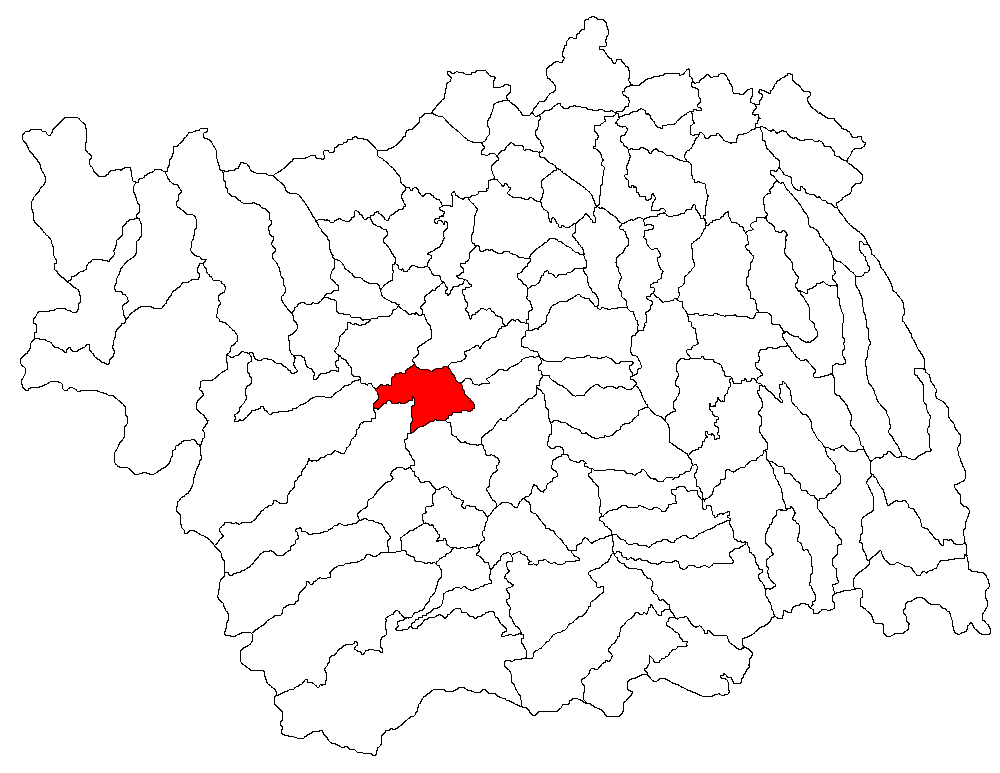
- Location in Bacău County

- Location in Romania
- Coordinates: 46°24′N 26°38′E
- Country: Romania
- County: Bacău

Government
  - Mayor (2024–2028): Sorin-Mihai Panțîru (USR)
- Area: 56.73 km^{2} (21.90 sq mi)
- Elevation: 355 m (1,165 ft)
- Population (2021-12-01): 4,637
  - Density: 82/km^{2} (210/sq mi)
- Time zone: EET/EEST (UTC+2/+3)
- Postal code: 607060
- Area code: +(40) 234
- Vehicle reg.: BC
- Website: comunaberzunti.ro

Berzunți is a commune in Bacău County, Western Moldavia, Romania. It is composed of three villages: Berzunți, Buda, and Dragomir.

Historical population
| Year | Pop. | ±% |
|---|---|---|
| 2002 | 5,346 | — |
| 2011 | 4,625 | −13.5% |
| 2021 | 4,637 | +0.3% |
Source: Census data
