= Strugari, Bacău =

Strugari
- Commune
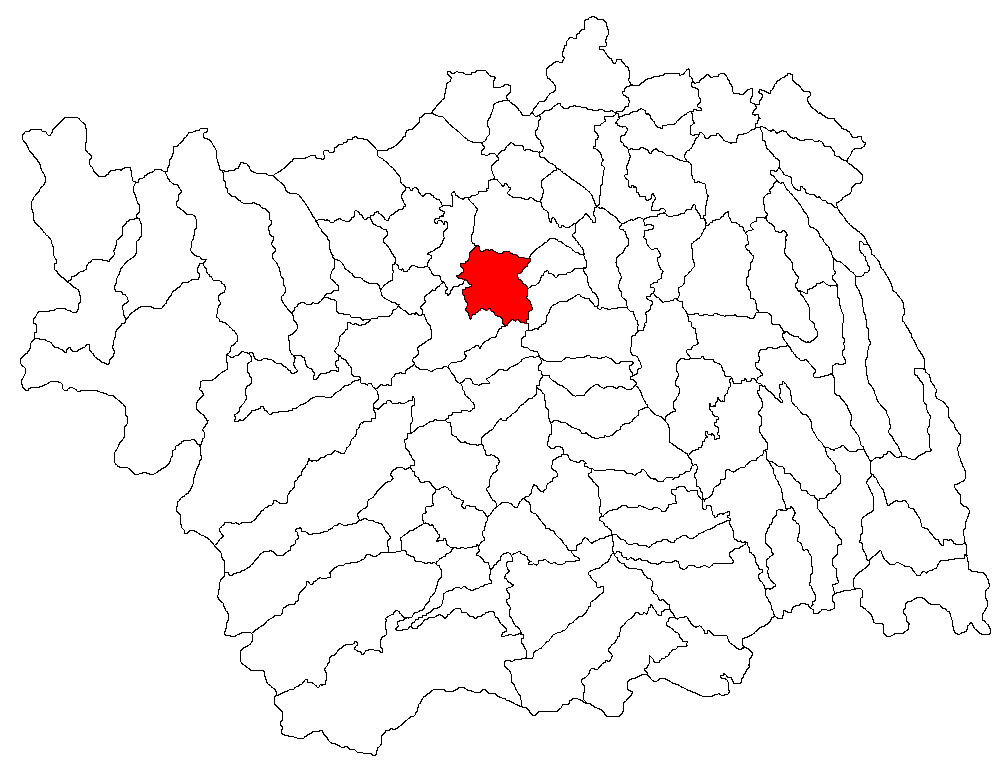
- Location in Bacău County

- Location in Romania
- Coordinates: 46°32′N 26°43′E
- Country: Romania
- County: Bacău

Government
  - Mayor (2024–2028): Vasile V. Rotariu (PSD)
- Elevation: 320 m (1,050 ft)
- Population (2021-12-01): 2,307
- Time zone: EET/EEST (UTC+2/+3)
- Postal code: 607595
- Area code: +(40) 234
- Vehicle reg.: BC
- Website: primariastrugari.ro

Strugari is a commune in Bacău County, Western Moldavia, Romania. It is composed of six villages: Cetățuia, Iaz, Nadișa, Petricica, Răchitișu, and Strugari.
