= Scorțeni, Bacău =

Scorțeni
- Commune
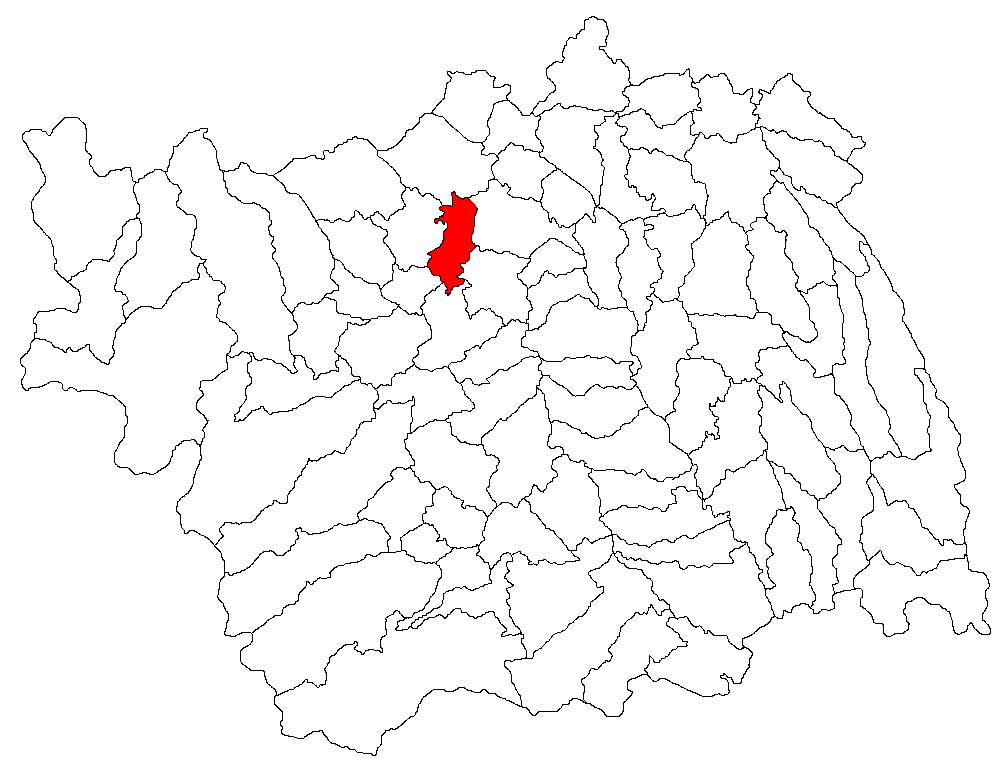
- Location in Bacău County

- Location in Romania
- Coordinates: 46.5586°N 26.6811°E
- Country: Romania
- County: Bacău

Government
  - Mayor (2024–2028): Vlad-George Rotariu (PNL)
- Area: 44.36 km^{2} (17.13 sq mi)
- Elevation: 341 m (1,119 ft)
- Population (2021-12-01): 2,469
  - Density: 55.66/km^{2} (144.2/sq mi)
- Time zone: UTC+02:00 (EET)
  - Summer (DST): UTC+03:00 (EEST)
- Postal code: 607550
- Area code: +(40) 0234
- Vehicle reg.: BC
- Website: comunascorteni.ro

Scorțeni is a commune in Bacău County, Western Moldavia, Romania. It is composed of six villages: Bogdănești, Florești, Grigoreni, Scorțeni, Stejaru, and Șerpeni.
