= Helegiu =

- Commune
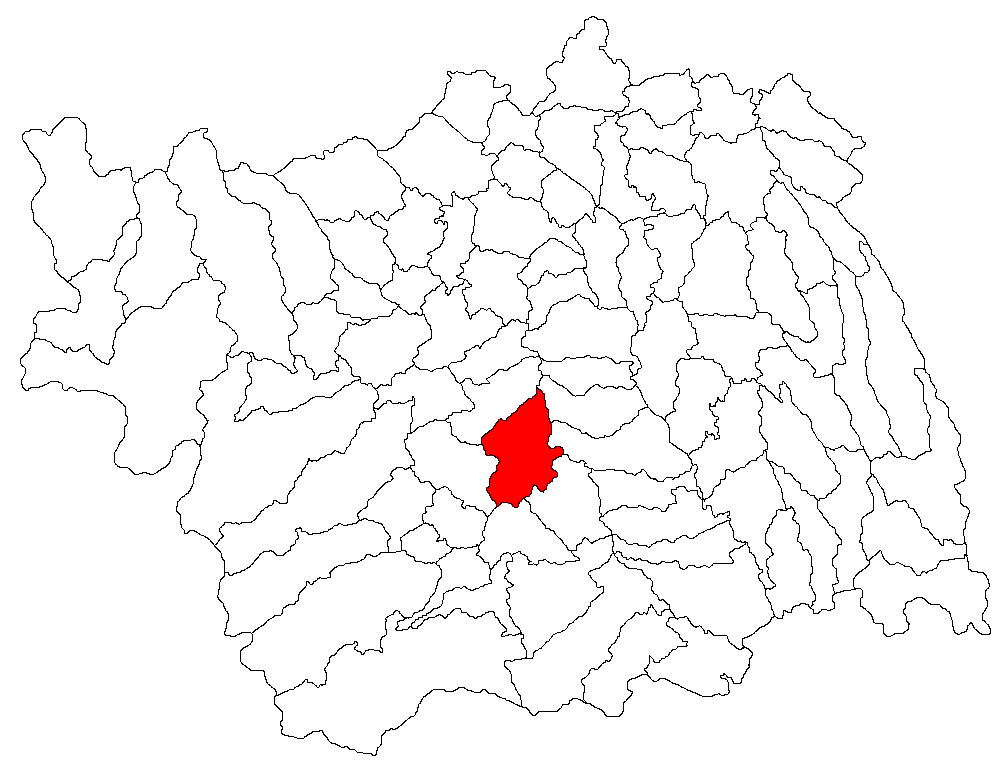
- Location in Bacău County

- Location in Romania
- Coordinates: 46°21′N 26°45′E
- Country: Romania
- County: Bacău

Government
  - Mayor (2024–2028): Ion Măgdălina (PSD)
- Area: 78.53 km^{2} (30.32 sq mi)
- Elevation: 253 m (830 ft)
- Population (2021-12-01): 5,934
  - Density: 75.56/km^{2} (195.7/sq mi)
- Time zone: UTC+02:00 (EET)
  - Summer (DST): UTC+03:00 (EEST)
- Postal code: 607230
- Area code: +(40) 0234
- Vehicle reg.: BC
- Website: helegiu.ro

Helegiu is a commune in Bacău County, Western Moldavia, Romania. It is composed of four villages: Brătila, Deleni, Drăgugești, and Helegiu.

The commune was founded by merging the two neighbouring communes of Helegiu and Brătila as a result of the administrative-territorial reorganization in 1968.
