= Bârsănești =

- Commune
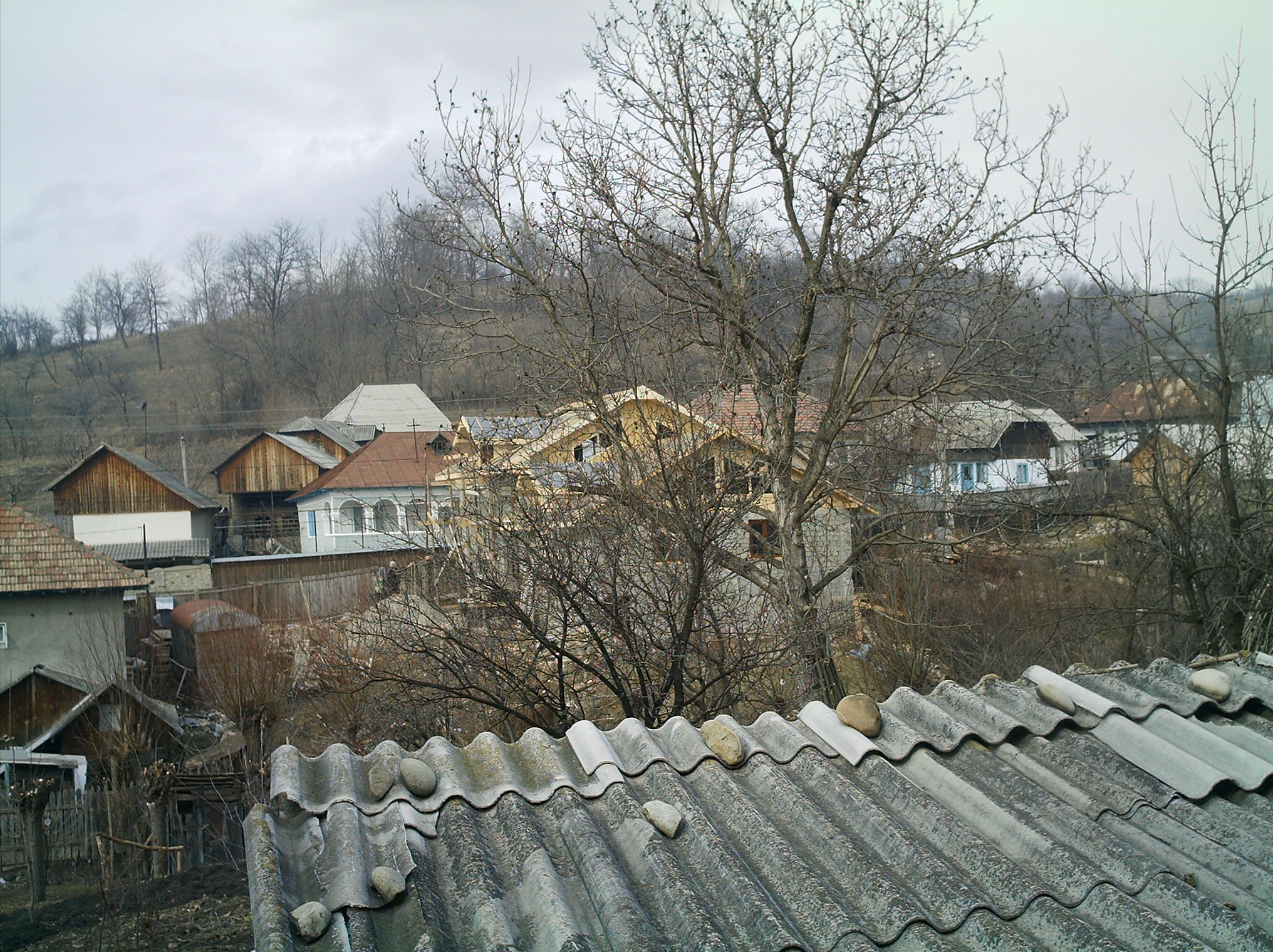
- View of Caraclău

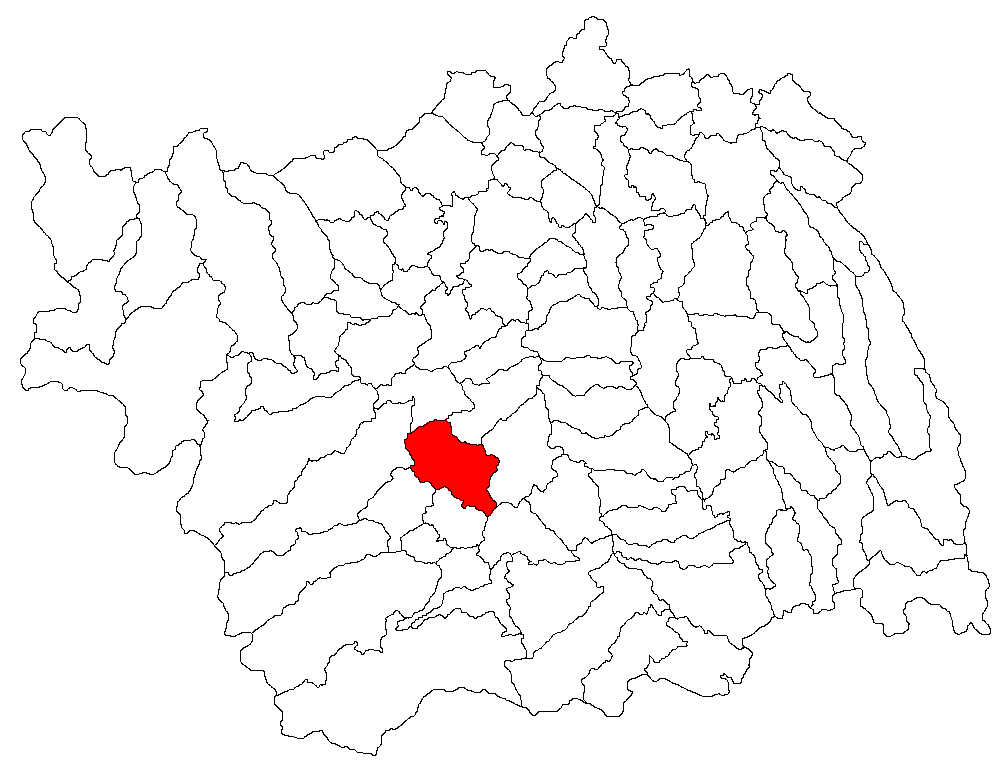
- Location in Bacău County

- Location in Romania
- Coordinates: 46°20′N 26°42′E
- Country: Romania
- County: Bacău

Government
  - Mayor (2024–2028): Vlad Costel Grigore (PSD)
- Area: 73.51 km^{2} (28.38 sq mi)
- Elevation: 268 m (879 ft)
- Population (2021-12-01): 4,258
  - Density: 57.92/km^{2} (150.0/sq mi)
- Time zone: UTC+02:00 (EET)
  - Summer (DST): UTC+03:00 (EEST)
- Postal code: 607035
- Area code: +(40) 234
- Vehicle reg.: BC
- Website: comunabirsanesti.ro

Bârsănești is a commune in Bacău County, Western Moldavia, Romania. It is composed of four villages: Albele, Bârsănești, Brătești, and Caraclău.

Historical population
Year	Pop.	±%
2002	5,105	—
2011	4,527	−11.3%
2021	4,258	−5.9%
Source: Census data
