= Balcani =

- Commune
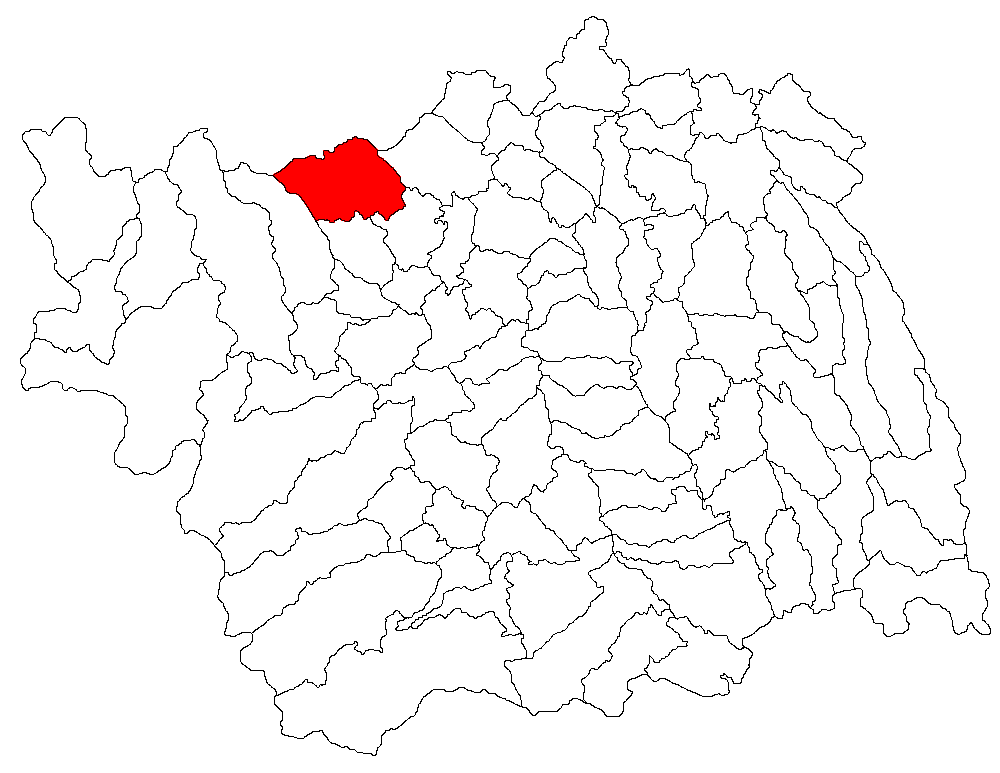
- Location in Bacău County

- Location in Romania
- Coordinates: 46°38′N 26°33′E
- Country: Romania
- County: Bacău

Government
  - Mayor (2020–2024): Vasile Luca (PSD)
- Area: 112.98 km^{2} (43.62 sq mi)
- Elevation: 430 m (1,410 ft)
- Population (2021-12-01): 6,742
  - Density: 59.67/km^{2} (154.6/sq mi)
- Time zone: UTC+02:00 (EET)
  - Summer (DST): UTC+03:00 (EEST)
- Postal code: 607030
- Area code: +(40) 234
- Vehicle reg.: BC
- Website: www.primaria-balcani.ro

Balcani (lit. 'Balkans') is a commune in Bacău County, Western Moldavia, Romania. It is composed of four villages: Balcani, Frumoasa, Ludași, and Schitu Frumoasa.

The commune is located in the foothills of the Eastern Carpathians, at an altitude of 430 m (1,410 ft), on the banks of the river Tazlău and its right tributary, the Schit. It is located in the northern part of the county, about 40 km (25 mi) northwest of the county seat, Bacău, on the border with Neamț County.

Historical population
Year	Pop.	±%
2002	8,051	—
2011	7,173	−10.9%
2021	6,742	−6.0%
Source: Census data
