= Solonț =

- Commune
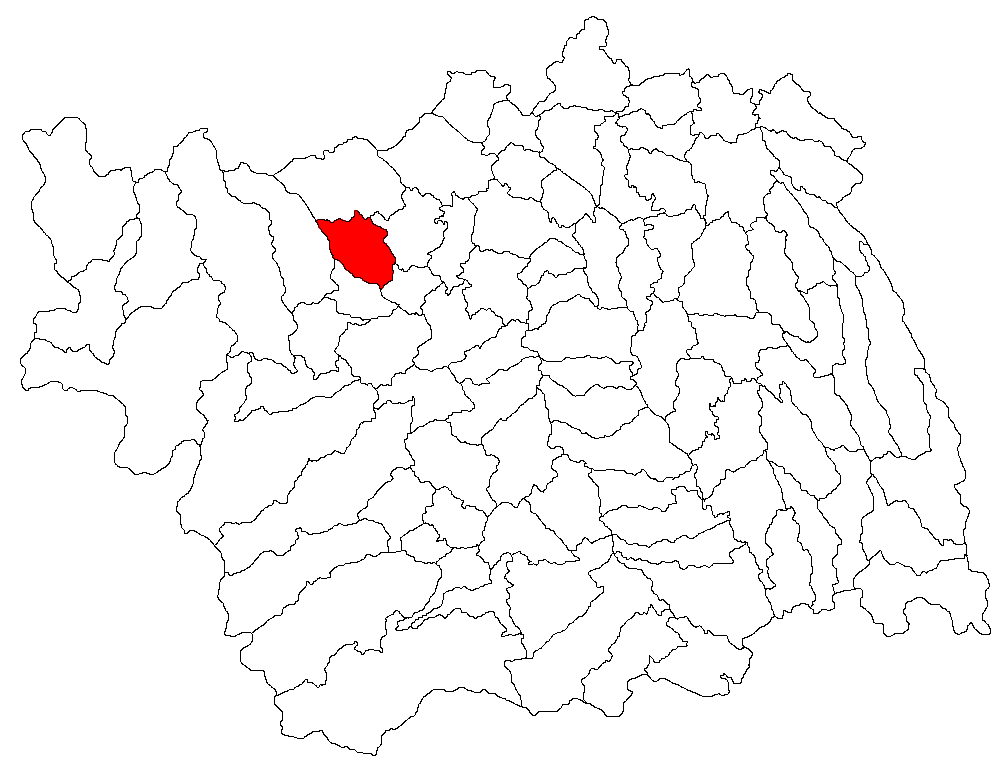
- Location in Bacău County

- Location in Romania
- Coordinates: 46°33′N 26°31′E
- Country: Romania
- County: Bacău

Government
  - Mayor (2024–2028): Eusebiu Alexandrescu (PSD)
- Elevation: 420 m (1,380 ft)
- Population (2021-12-01): 3,109
- Time zone: EET/EEST (UTC+2/+3)
- Postal code: 607580
- Area code: +(40) 234
- Vehicle reg.: BC
- Website: comunasolont.ro

Solonț is a commune in Bacău County, Western Moldavia, Romania. It is composed of three villages: Cucuieți, Sărata, and Solonț.
