= Berești-Tazlău =

- Commune
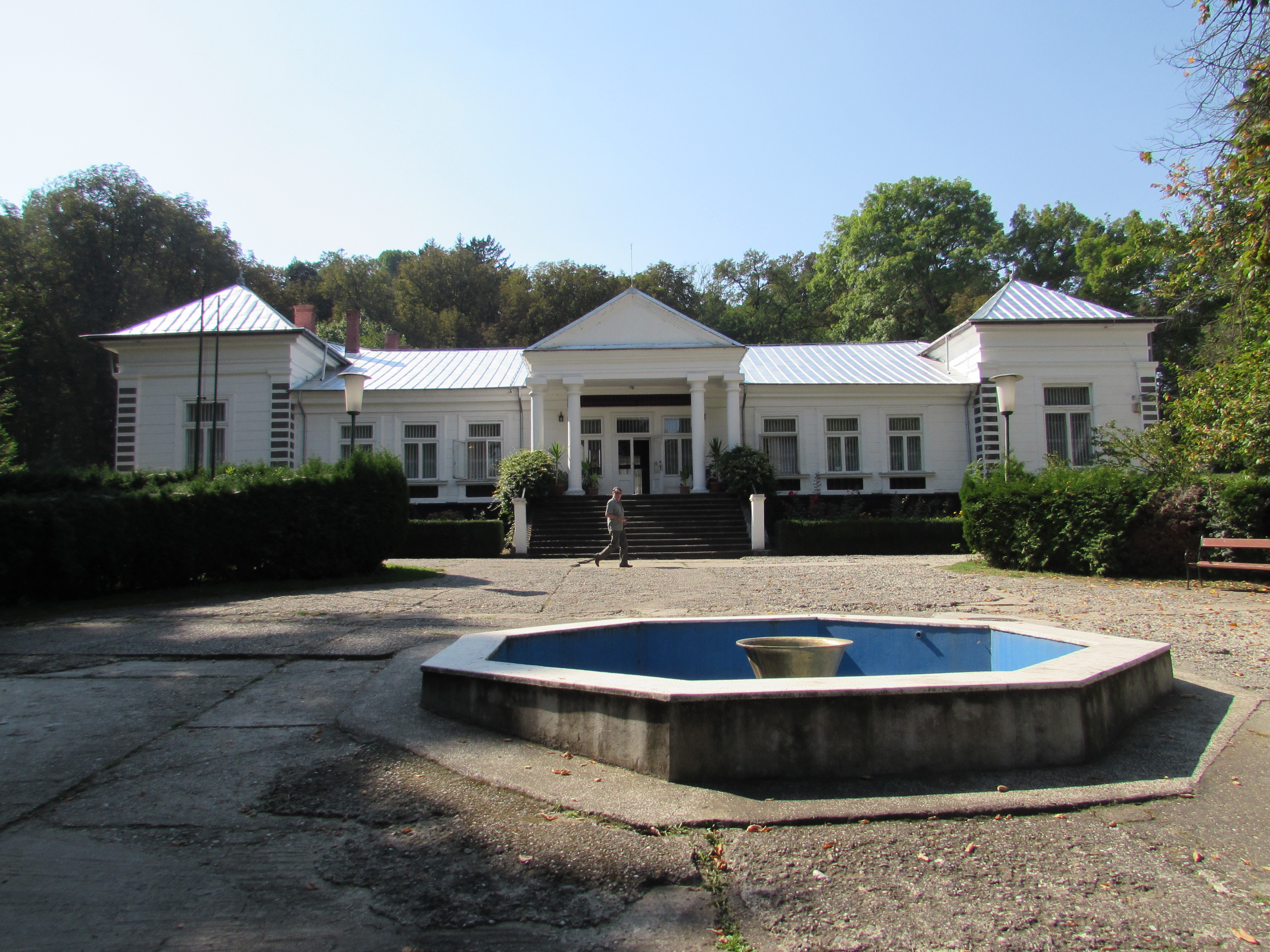
- Rosetti-Tescanu manor in Tescani

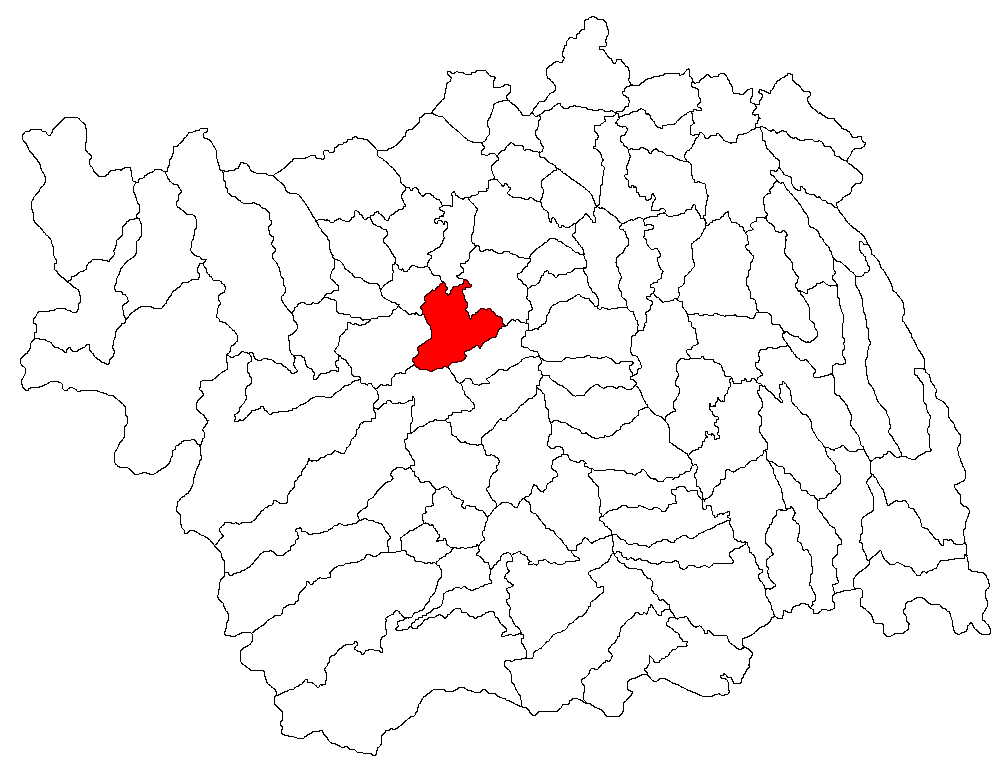
- Location in Bacău County

- Location in Romania
- Coordinates: 46°28′N 26°40′E
- Country: Romania
- County: Bacău

Government
  - Mayor (2020–2024): Dumitru Tulpan (PSD)
- Area: 66.74 km^{2} (25.77 sq mi)
- Elevation: 279 m (915 ft)
- Population (2021-12-01): 5,337
  - Density: 79.97/km^{2} (207.1/sq mi)
- Time zone: UTC+02:00 (EET)
  - Summer (DST): UTC+03:00 (EEST)
- Postal code: 607050
- Area code: +(40) 234
- Vehicle reg.: BC
- Website: comunaberesti-tazlau.ro

Berești-Tazlău is a commune in Bacău County, Western Moldavia, Romania. It is composed of seven villages: Berești-Tazlău, Boșoteni, Enăchești, Prisaca, Românești, Tescani, and Turluianu.

Historical population
Year	Pop.	±%
2002	5,708	—
2011	5,342	−6.4%
2021	5,337	−0.1%
Source: Census data

== Natives ==
- Maria Tescanu Rosetti (1879–1968), aristocrat and royal court official
