= Pârjol =

- Commune
- Cross in Câmpeni

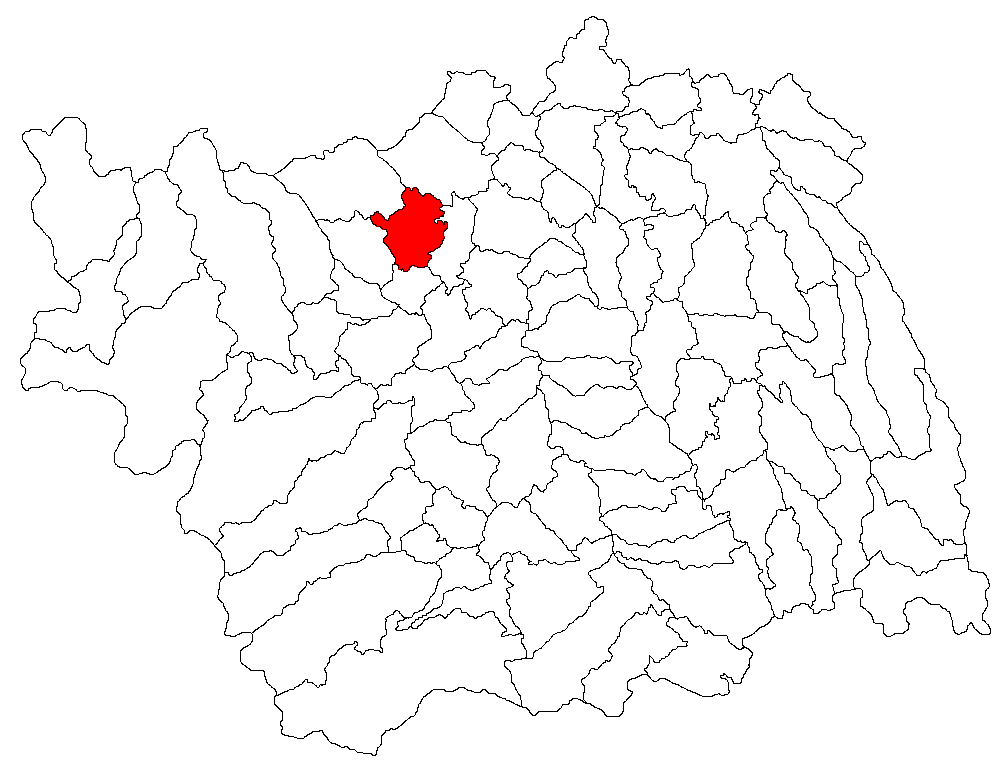
- Location in Bacău County

- Location in Romania
- Coordinates: 46°35′N 26°36′E
- Country: Romania
- County: Bacău

Government
  - Mayor (2024–2028): Vasile Lupu (PNL)
- Area: 53.79 km^{2} (20.77 sq mi)
- Elevation: 320 m (1,050 ft)
- Population (2021-12-01): 5,555
  - Density: 103.3/km^{2} (267.5/sq mi)
- Time zone: UTC+02:00 (EET)
  - Summer (DST): UTC+03:00 (EEST)
- Postal code: 607430
- Area code: +(40) 0234
- Vehicle reg.: BC
- Website: primaria-pirjol.ro

Pârjol is a commune in Bacău County, Western Moldavia, Romania. It is composed of nine villages: Băhnășeni, Bărnești, Băsăști, Câmpeni, Hăineala, Hemieni (established in 2003), Pârjol, Pustiana, and Tărâța.

At the 2011 census, the commune's 5,404 inhabitants were 94.2% Romanian and 3.53% Hungarian; at the 2002 census, they were 64.2% Romanian Orthodox, 35% Roman Catholic, and 0.8% Old Calendar Orthodox. At the 2021 census, Pârjol had a population of 5,555; of those, 89.52% were Romanians and 1.75% Hungarians.

== Pustiana ==
The village of Pustiana (Hungarian: Pusztina) was first mentioned in 1792. It was established by Székelys who fled from Transylvania after the Siculicidium. In 2002, it had 1961 people, broken down as follows: Romanians (78.99%), Hungarians (17.24%), Csangos (4.89%).
