= Livezi, Bacău =

Livezi
- Commune
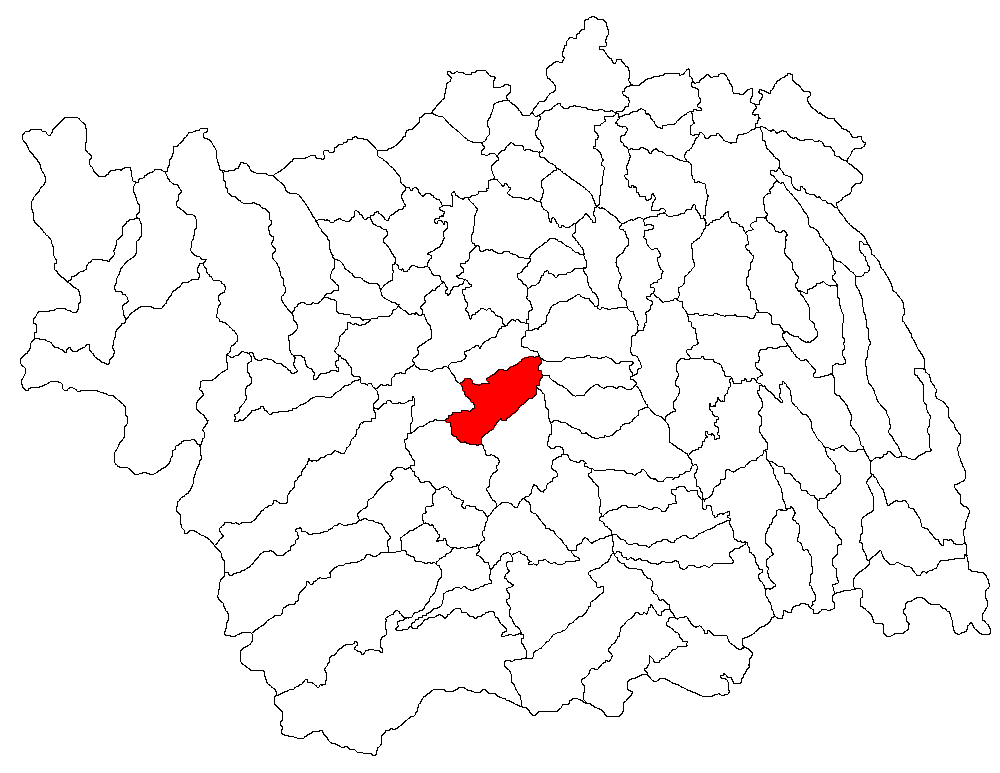
- Location in Bacău County

- Location in Romania
- Coordinates: 46°24′N 26°44′E
- Country: Romania
- County: Bacău

Government
  - Mayor (2024–2028): Sorin Ichim (PNL)
- Area: 58.02 km^{2} (22.40 sq mi)
- Elevation: 257 m (843 ft)
- Population (2021-12-01): 5,094
  - Density: 87.80/km^{2} (227.4/sq mi)
- Time zone: UTC+02:00 (EET)
  - Summer (DST): UTC+03:00 (EEST)
- Postal code: 607285
- Area code: +(40) 0234
- Vehicle reg.: BC
- Website: comunalivezi.ro

Livezi is a commune in Bacău County, Western Moldavia, Romania. It is composed of six villages: Bălăneasa, Livezi, Orășa, Poiana, Prăjoaia, and Scăriga.

== Natives ==
- Gheorghe Poenaru (born 1956), football player and manager
