= Sănduleni =

- Commune
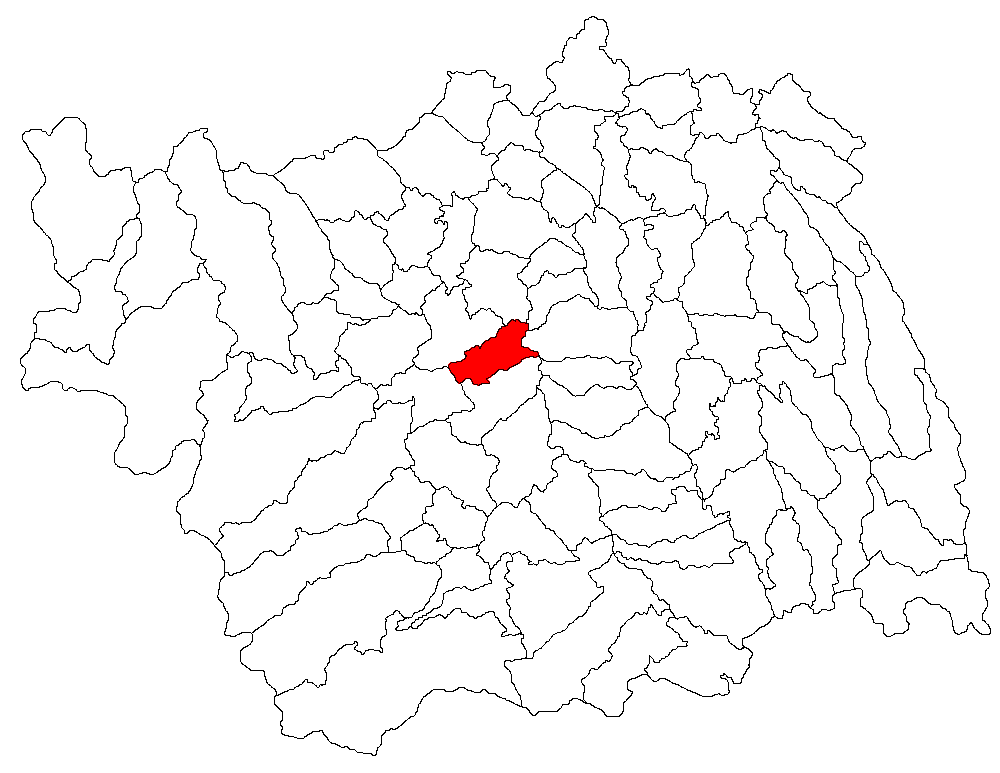
- Location in Bacău County

- Location in Romania
- Coordinates: 46°27′N 26°44′E
- Country: Romania
- County: Bacău

Government
  - Mayor (2024–2028): Petrea Clopotaru (PSD)
- Area: 43.26 km^{2} (16.70 sq mi)
- Elevation: 278 m (912 ft)
- Population (2021-12-01): 4,106
  - Density: 94.91/km^{2} (245.8/sq mi)
- Time zone: UTC+02:00 (EET)
  - Summer (DST): UTC+03:00 (EEST)
- Postal code: 607530
- Area code: +(40) 0234
- Vehicle reg.: BC
- Website: primariasanduleni.ro

Sănduleni is a commune in Bacău County, Western Moldavia, Romania. It is composed of seven villages: Bârzulești, Coman, Mateiești, Sănduleni, Stufu, Tisa, and Verșești.
