= Bacău County =

County of Romania

Bacău County Județul Bacău
- County
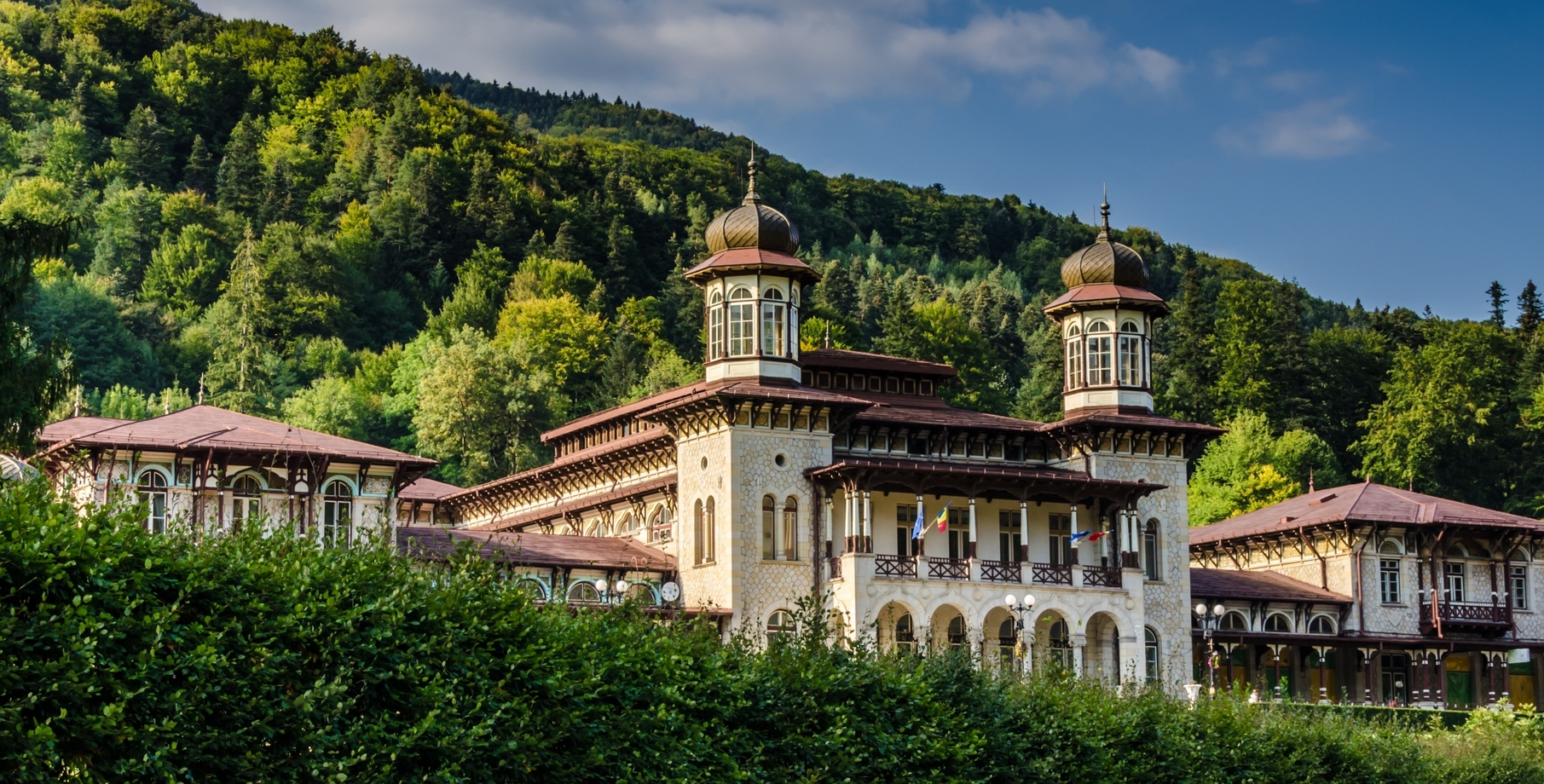
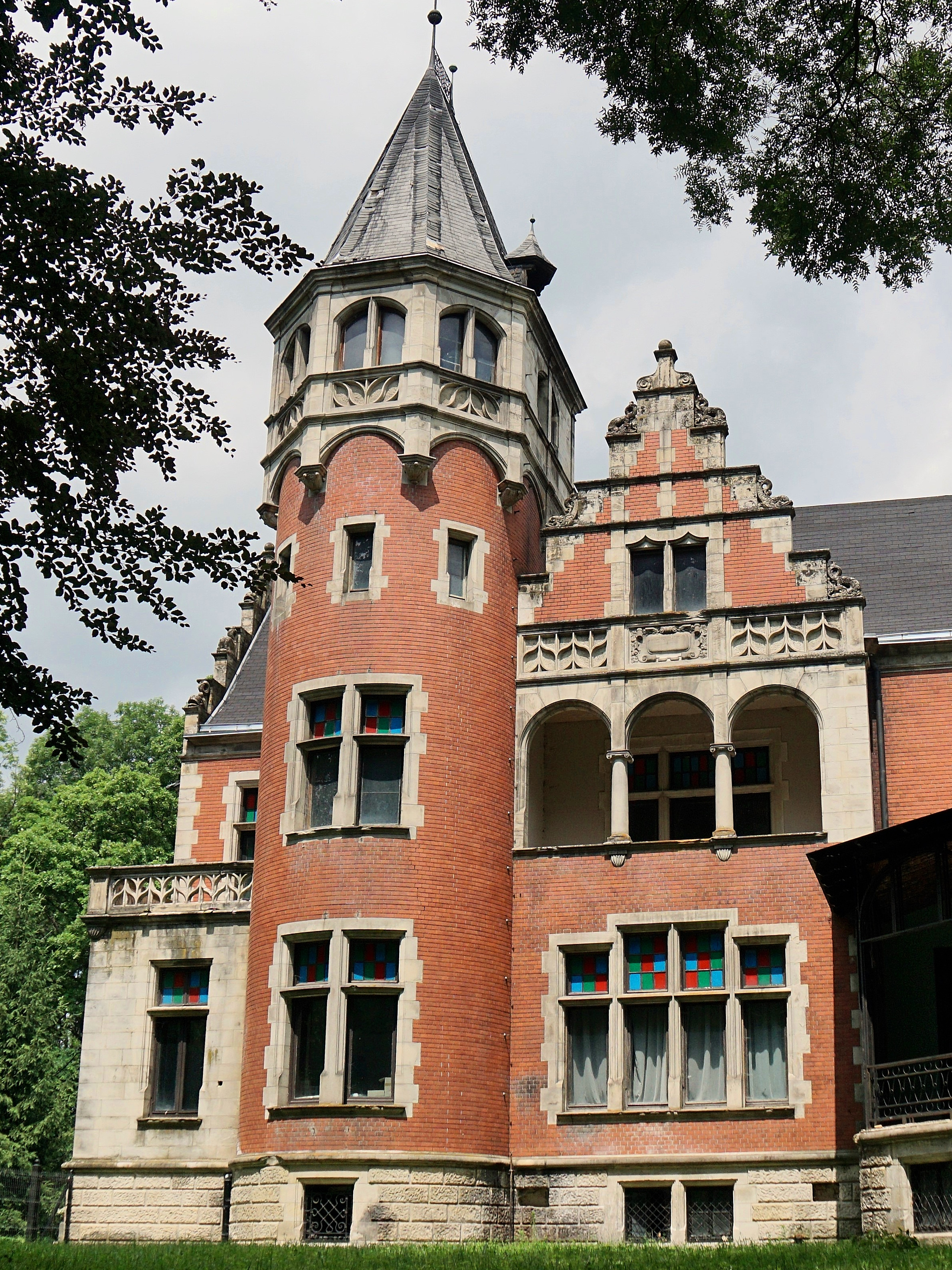
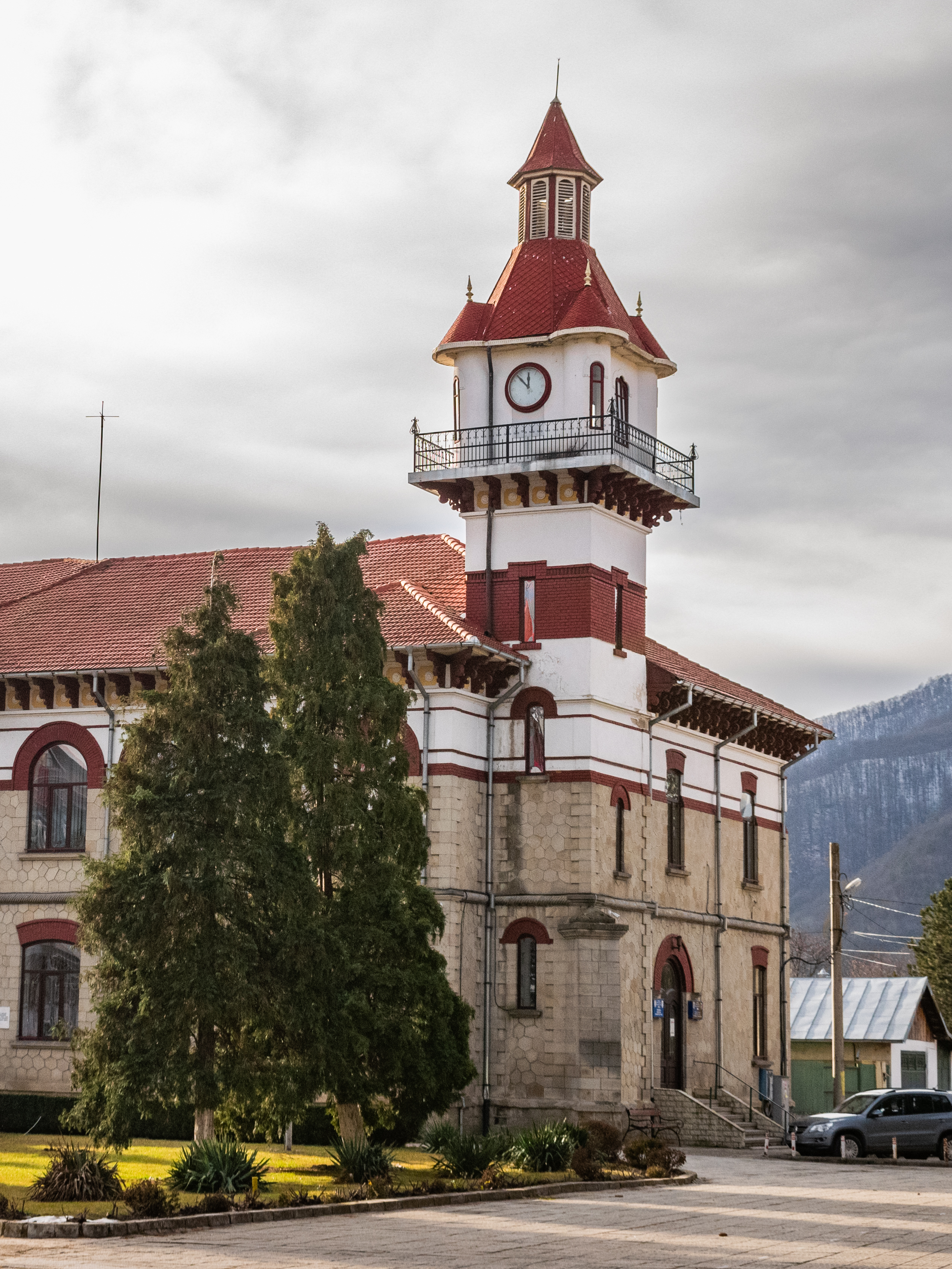
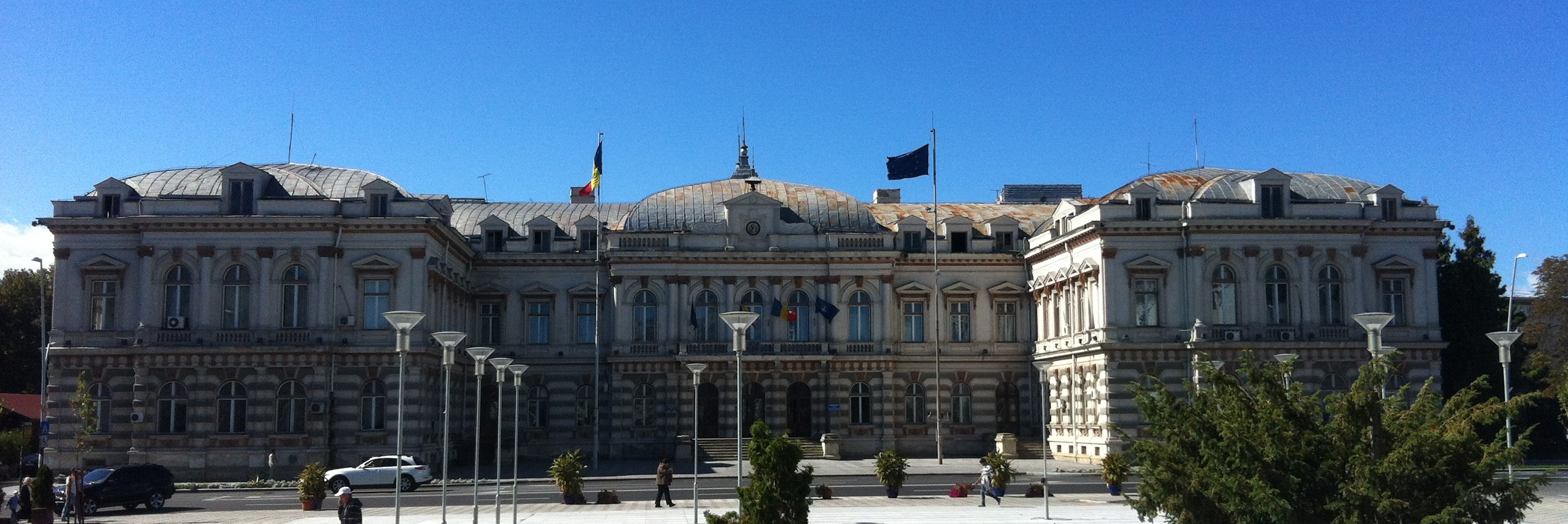
- Slănic-Moldova Casino Ghika Palace, Dofteana Târgu Ocna town hall County Prefecture, Bacău

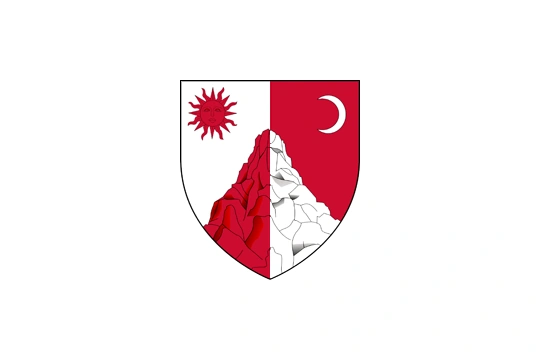
- Flag Coat of arms

- Location of Bacău County in Romania
- Coordinates: 46.42°N 26.78°E
- Country: Romania
- Development region^{1}: Nord-Est
- Historic region: Western Moldavia
- Capital city (Reședință de județ): Bacău

Government
  - Type: County Council
  - President of the County Council: Valentin Ivancea (PSD)
  - Prefect^{2}: Claudiu-Augustin Ilișanu

Area
  - Total: 6,621 km^{2} (2,556 sq mi)
  - Rank: 14th in Romania

Population (2021-12-01)
  - Total: 601,387
  - Rank: 9th in Romania
  - Density: 90.83/km^{2} (235.2/sq mi)
- Time zone: UTC+2 (EET)
  - Summer (DST): UTC+3 (EEST)
- Postal Code: 60wxyz^{3}
- Area code: +40 x34^{4}
- Car Plates: BC^{5}
- GDP: US$3.495 billion (2015)
- GDP per capita: US$5,672 (2015)
- Website: County Council; County Prefecture
- ^{1}The development regions of Romania have no administrative role and were formed in order to manage funds from the European Union.^{2}As of 2007, the Prefect is not a politician, but a public functionary who is not allowed to be a member of a political party, and is banned from engaging in any political activity in the first six months after the resignation (or exclusion) from the public functionary corps.^{3}w, x, y, and z are digits that indicate the city, the street, part of the street, or even the building of the address^{4}x is a digit indicating the operator: 2 for the former national operator, Romtelecom, and 3 for the other ground telephone networks^{5}used on both the plates of the vehicles that operate only in the county limits (like utility vehicles, ATVs, etc.), and the ones used outside the county

Bacău County (Romanian pronunciation: [baˈkəw]) is a county (județ) of Romania, in Western Moldavia, with its capital city at Bacău. It has one commune, Ghimeș-Făget, in Transylvania.

== Geography ==
This county has a total area of 6,621 km^{2} (2,556 sq mi).

In the western part of the county there are mountains from the Eastern Carpathian group. Here, along the valleys of the Oituz River and Trotuș River, there are two important links between Moldavia and Transylvania. On the East side, the heights decrease and the lowest point can be found on the Siret River valley which crosses the county from North to South down the middle. On the East side there is the Moldavian Plateau crossed by many small rivers.

=== Climate ===
The climate is temperate-continental with excessive nuances in the East and moderate ones in the West, featuring marked altitudinal differences. The average annual temperature varies between 2°C in the mountain zone, 8°C in the sub-Carpathian and plateau regions, and 9–10°C in the Siret River meadow. The absolute maximum temperature, and the absolute minimum were both recorded in Bacău, being 42.5 °C (7 August 2012) and -32.5 °C (20 February 1954). The amount of precipitation shows variations in relation to the relief units, reaching average annual values between 550 mm in the eastern part of the county and 1,100 mm on the mountain ridges in the West. The predominant direction of the winds denotes an accentuated frequency of air circulation from the North, Northwest, and Northeast, with their average annual speed varying between 4 and 6 m/s, and higher speeds recorded during the winter.

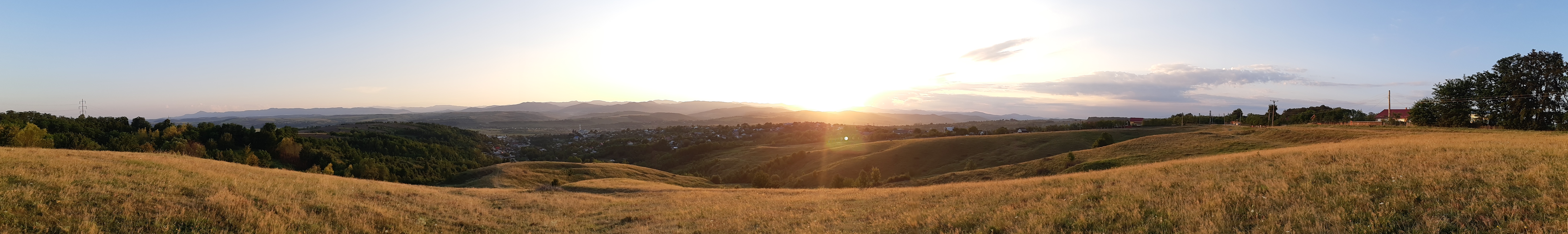
Tazlău-Cașin Depression

=== Flora and fauna ===
Bears, wolves, foxes, wild boars, and squirrels inhabit Bacău County's mountains, particularly in its rural Slănic-Moldova region; the remnants of the local deer are preserved in Mănăstirea Cașin.

=== Neighbours ===
- Vaslui County in the East.
- Harghita County and Covasna County in the West.
- Neamț County in the North.
- Vrancea County in the South.

== Economy ==
The county of Bacău was one of the most industrialized regions in the communist period and it remained Moldavia's most important industrial center ever since. There are two large oil refineries at Onești and Dărmănești. Following the collapse of the communist regime, Bacău continued to be the region's most important GDP supplier, but the county became more famous for the controversial figures involved in the local economy than for its performance.

The predominant industries in the county are:

- The chemical and oil industry.
- Food industry.
- Construction materials industry.
- Wood and paper industry.
- Textile industry.
- Mechanical components industry.
- Aeronautics industry.

In Bacău County there are important reserves of oil and salt. Coal is also exploited.

== Tourism ==
The main tourist destinations in the county are:

- The cities of Bacău and Onești.
- Resorts:
  - Poiana Sărată
  - Poiana Uzului
  - Slănic-Moldova
  - Târgu Ocna
- The Nemira Mountains.

== Demographics ==
Year	County population	Population density	Romanians	Romani people	Hungarians
1948	414,996				
1956	507,937 ▲				
1966	598,321 ▲				
1977	667,791 ▲				
1992	737,512 ▲				
2002	706,623 ▼	113 / km^{2}	97.5%	1.7%	0.7%
2011	616,168 ▼	93 / km^{2}	96.1%	1.7%	0.68%
2021	601,387 ▼	91 / km^{2}			

Some estimates put the total number of Csángós at around 70,000 in 1987.

== Politics ==
The Bacău County Council, renewed at the 2024 local elections, consists of 36 councilors, with the following party composition:

Party	Seats	Current County Council
Social Democratic Party (PSD)	15	
National Liberal Party (PNL)	12	
Alliance for the Union of Romanians (AUR)	5	
United Right Alliance (ADU)	4	

== People ==
- Gabriela Adameșteanu
- Vasile Alecsandri
- George Bacovia
- Radu Beligan
- Nadia Comăneci
- Loredana Groza
- Ioan Măric
- Vasile Pârvan
- Lucrețiu Pătrășcanu
- Radu R. Rosetti
- Tristan Tzara
- Nicu Enea

== Administrative divisions ==
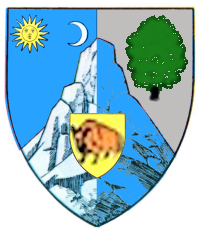
The coat of arms used until 3 March 2008

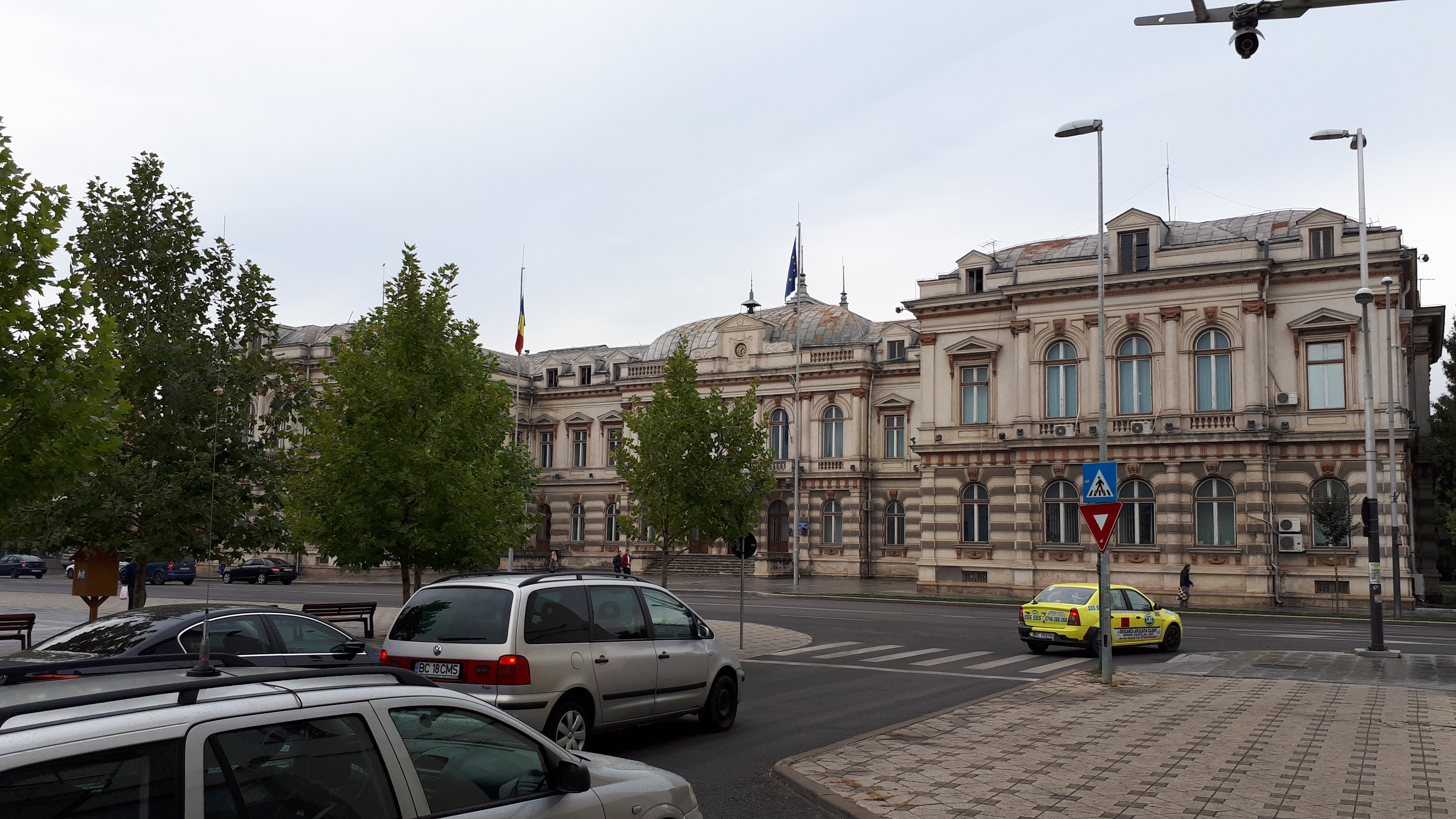
Bacău

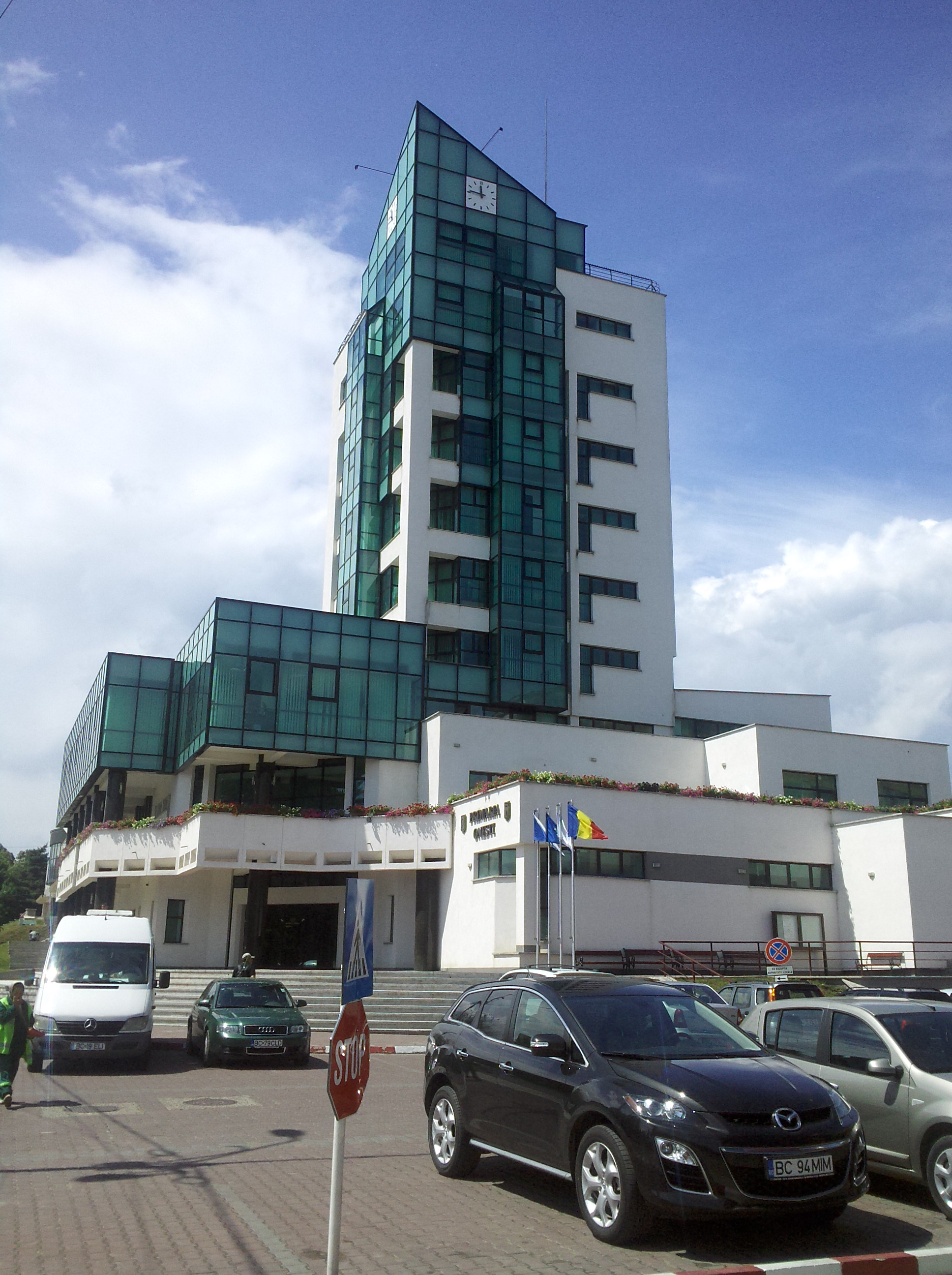
Onești

Bacău County has 3 municipalities, 5 towns, and 85 communes

- Municipalities
  - Bacău – capital city; population: 136,087 (as of 2021)
  - Moinești
  - Onești
- Towns
  - Buhuși
  - Comănești
  - Dărmănești
  - Slănic-Moldova
  - Târgu Ocna
- Communes
  - Agăș
  - Ardeoani
  - Asău
  - Balcani
  - Berești-Bistrița
  - Berești-Tazlău
  - Berzunţi
  - Bârsănești
  - Blăgești
  - Bogdănești
  - Brusturoasa
  - Buciumi
  - Buhoci
  - Cașin
  - Căiuți
  - Cleja
  - Colonești
  - Corbasca
  - Coțofănești
  - Dămienești
  - Dealu Morii
  - Dofteana
  - Faraoani
  - Filipeni
  - Filipești
  - Găiceana
  - Ghimeș-Făget
  - Gârleni
  - Glăvănești
  - Gioseni
  - Gura Văii
  - Helegiu
  - Hemeiuș
  - Huruiești
  - Horgești
  - Izvoru Berheciului
  - Itești
  - Letea Veche
  - Lipova
  - Livezi
  - Luizi-Călugăra
  - Măgirești
  - Măgura
  - Mănăstirea Cașin
  - Mărgineni
  - Motoșeni
  - Negri
  - Nicolae Bălcescu
  - Odobești
  - Oituz
  - Oncești
  - Orbeni
  - Palanca
  - Parava
  - Pâncești
  - Parincea
  - Pârgărești
  - Pârjol
  - Plopana
  - Podu Turcului
  - Poduri
  - Prăjești
  - Racova
  - Răcăciuni
  - Răchitoasa
  - Roșiori
  - Sascut
  - Sănduleni
  - Sărata
  - Săucești
  - Scorțeni
  - Secuieni
  - Solonț
  - Stănișești
  - Strugari
  - Ștefan cel Mare
  - Tamași
  - Tătărăști
  - Târgu Trotuș
  - Traian
  - Ungureni
  - Urechești
  - Valea Seacă
  - Vultureni
  - Zemeș

== Politics ==
Bacău became famous after electing Ilie Ilașcu of the Greater Romania Party as their Senator, while he was held in prison in Transnistria.

== Historical county ==
Județul Bacău
- County (Județ)
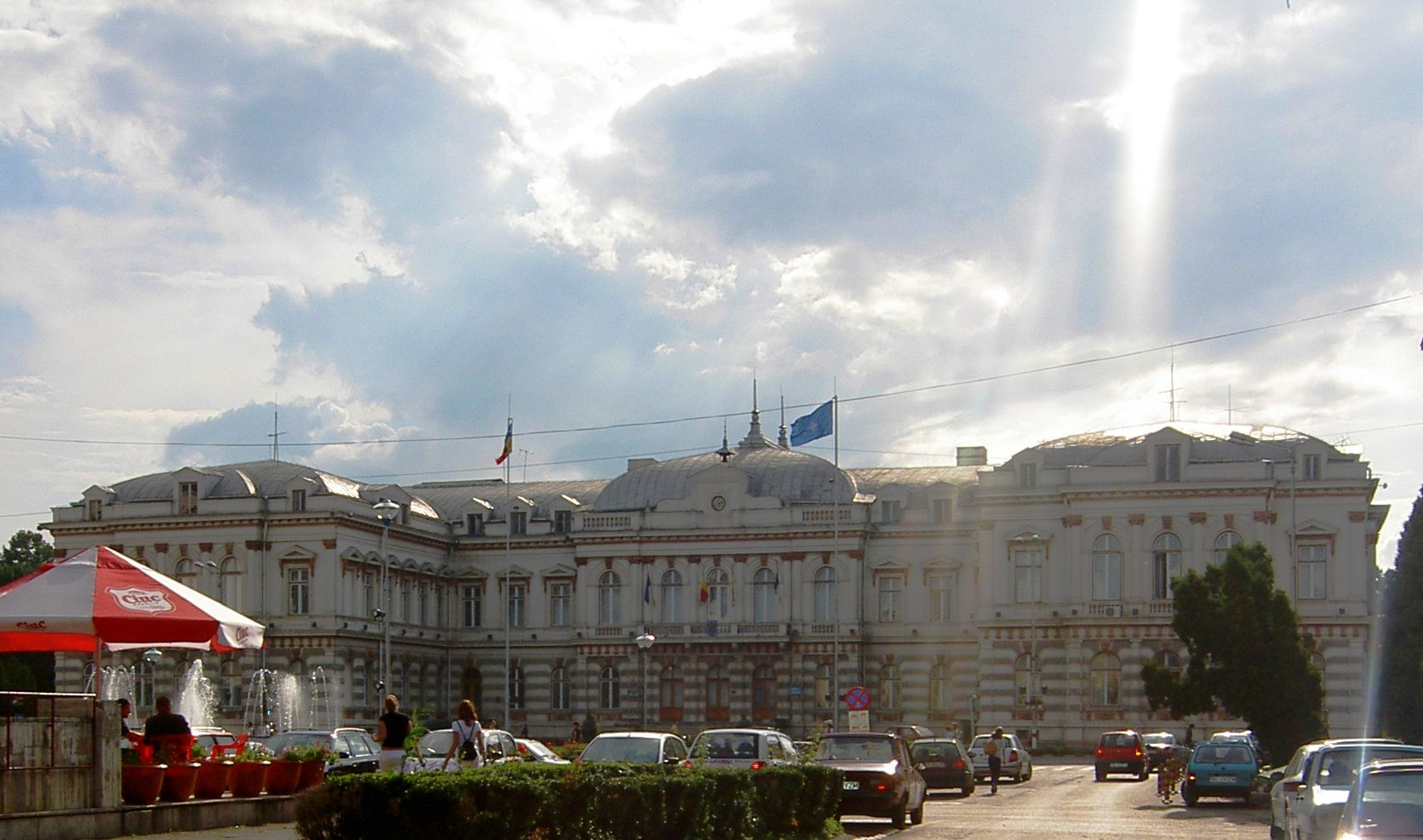
- The building of the Bacău Prefecture from the interwar period

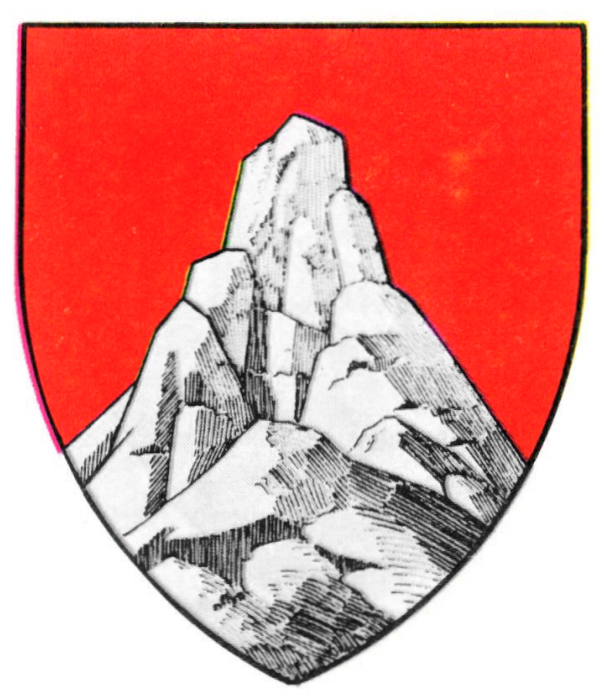
- Coat of arms

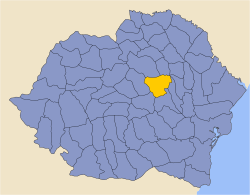
- Country: Romania
- Historic region: Western Moldavia
- Capital city (Reședință de județ): Bacău

Area
  - Total: 4,410 km^{2} (1,700 sq mi)

Population (1930)
  - Total: 260,781
  - Density: 59.1/km^{2} (153/sq mi)
- Time zone: UTC+2 (EET)
  - Summer (DST): UTC+3 (EEST)

Between the world wars, Bacău County had a different territorial extent. The county was located in the east central part of Greater Romania, in the center of Moldavia. Its territory included the central part of the current Bacău County. It bordered on the west with the counties of Trei Scaune and Ciuc, in the north with Neamț and Roman counties, in the east with the counties of Tutova and Tecuci, and in the south with Putna County.

=== Administration ===
The county was originally divided into five districts (plăși):

1. Plasa Bistrița
2. Plasa Muntele, headquartered in Moinești
3. Plasa Oituz, headquartered in Oituz
4. Plasa Siret, headquartered in Siret
5. Plasa Tazlău, headquartered in Tazlău

Subsequently, two more districts were established:

6. Plasa Răcăciuni, headquartered in Răcăciuni
7. Plasa Traian, headquartered in Traian

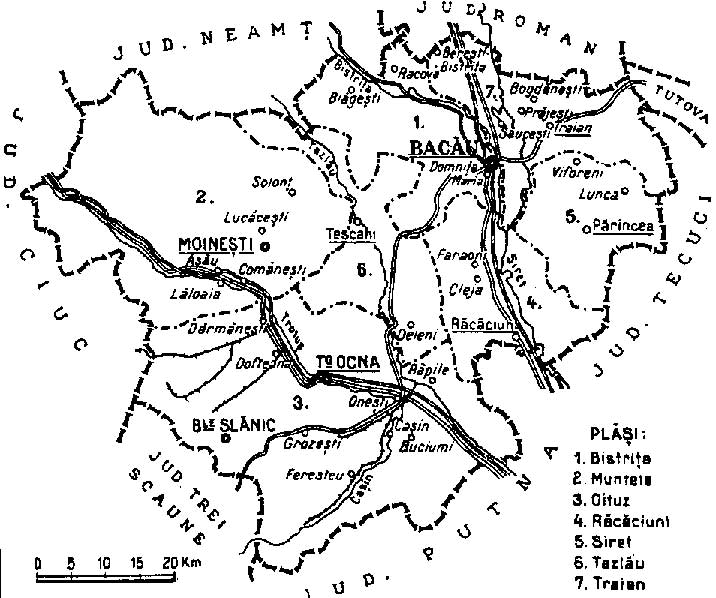
Map of Bacău County as it existed in 1938

=== Population ===
According to the 1930 census data, the county population was 260,781, comprising 88.6% Romanians, 5.3% Jews, 3.3% Hungarians, as well as other minorities. From the religious point of view, 75.8% were Eastern Orthodox, 18.1% Roman Catholics, 5.5% Jewish, as well as other minorities.

==== Urban population ====
In 1930, the county's urban population was 50,342, of which 70.1% were Romanians, 23.9% were Jews, 2.2% were Hungarians, as well as other minorities. From a religious point of view, the urban population consisted of 64.9% Eastern Orthodox, 24.4% Jewish, 9.3% Roman Catholic, as well as other minorities.
