= Tazlăul Sărat =

- Location within Romania

Location
- Country: Romania
- Counties: Neamț, Bacău

Physical characteristics
- Source: Mount Floaca
  - location: Tarcău Mountains
  - coordinates: 46°39′28″N 26°19′30″E
- Mouth: Tazlău
  - location: Tescani
  - coordinates: 46°30′31″N 26°40′10″E
  - elevation: 282 m (925 ft)
- Length: 46 km (29 mi)
- Basin size: 210 km^{2} (81 sq mi)

Basin features
- Progression: Tazlău→ Trotuș→ Siret→ Danube→ Black Sea

The Tazlăul Sărat is a right tributary of the river Tazlău in Romania. It discharges into the Tazlău in Tescani. The following towns and villages are situated along the river Tazlăul Sărat, from source to mouth: Bolătău, Zemeș, Moinești, Găzărie, Prohozești, Negreni, Șesuri, Leontinești and Ardeoani. Its length is 46 km (29 mi) and its basin size is 210 km^{2} (81 sq mi).

== Tributaries ==
The following rivers are tributaries to the river Tazlăul Sărat:

- Left: Cuț, Fărcășu, Canuș, Valea Arinilor, Ruja, Frasin, Călmuș
- Right: Holmul, Piciorul Scurt, Coșnia, Lingura, Pârâul Corbului, Coacăza, Pârâul Ursului (or Ursu), Toplița, Manoli, Ariniș, Zemeș, Pârâul Sec, Pietrosul, Fundătura
