= Platon =

Platon is a masculine given name and surname which may refer to:

== Given name ==
- Plato (exarch) (fl. 645–653), romanized as Plátōn, Exarch of Ravenna in the Byzantine Empire from 645 to 649
- Platon, obscure ancient Greek writer of uncertain date, whose attributed works share a name with those of Aristagoras (poet)
- Platon Agrikolyansky – Eastern Orthodox priest
- Platon Atanacković (1788–1867), Serbian writer, linguist, patron of Serb culture and Eastern Orthodox bishop of the Eparchy of Bačka
- Platon Chirnoagă (1894–1974), Romanian brigadier-general during World War II
- Platon Drakoulis (1858–1942), Greek socialist politician
- Platon Gamaleya (1766–1817), Russian Empire naval officer and navigation scientist of Ukrainian origin
- Platon Ioseliani (1810–1875), Georgian historian and Russian Empire civil servant
- Platon Ivanov (1863–1939), Russian-Finnish civil servant
- Platon Jovanović (1874–1941), better known as Platon of Banja Luka, Serbian Orthodox Bishop of Banja Luka and hieromartyr
- Platon Karsavin (1854–1922), Russian Imperial Ballet dancer and dance teacher
- Platon Kerzhentsev (1881–1940), Soviet state and party official, revolutionary, diplomat, journalist, historian, playwright and theatre and arts theorist
- Platon Kostiuk (1924–2010), Soviet and Ukrainian physiologist, neurobiologist, electrophysiologist and biophysicist
- Platon Krivoshchyokov (born 1968), Russian former footballer
- Platon Kulbusch (1869–1919), Estonian Orthodox Bishop of Tallinn and All Estonia
- Platon Lebedev (born 1956), Russian businessman
- Platon Levshin (1737–1812), Metropolitan of Moscow
- Platon Maiboroda (1918–1989), Soviet and Ukrainian composer and educator
- Platon Obukhov (born 1968), Russian journalist, writer, translator and painter convicted of spying for the UK
- Platon Oyunsky, pen name of Platon Sleptsov (1893–1939), Yakut Soviet writer, philologist and bureaucrat
- Platon Poretsky (1846–1907), Russian Imperial astronomer, mathematician and logician
- Platon Rozhdestvensky (1866–1934), first American Orthodox archbishop
- Platon Shirinsky-Shikhmatov (1790–1853), Russian poet
- Platon Udovenko (1940–2026), Russian Orthodox Metropolitan Bishop
- Platon Zakharchuk (born 1972), Russian football coach and former player
- Platon Zubov (1767–1822), last of Catherine the Great's favorites and the most powerful man in the Russian Empire during the last years of her reign
- Platon (photographer) (born 1968), Greek-English photographer Platon Antoniou

== Surname ==
- Alina Platon (fl. 2005–2006), Romanian sprint canoer
- Charles Platon (1886–1944), French admiral and supporter of Vichy France
- Clark Platon (1930–2025), Brazilian politician
- Eugene Platon (born 1959), Russian yachtsman
- Nikolaos Platon (1909–1992), Greek archaeologist
- Ruslan Platon (born 1982), Ukrainian footballer
- Veaceslav Platon (born 1973), Moldovan businessman and politician convicted for money laundering, but later acquitted

== See also ==
- Plato (disambiguation)
