= Plato (disambiguation) =

Plato (428/427 or 424/423 – 348/347 BCE) was a Greek philosopher.

Plato may also refer to:

== People ==
=== Given name or nickname ===
- Plato (comic poet) (fl. 420–391 BCE)
- Plato of Bactria (2nd century BCE), Greco-Bactrian king
- Plato (exarch) (fl. 645–653), Byzantine exarch of Ravenna
- Plato II (1737–1812), Metropolitan of Moscow in 1775–1812
- Plato III (born 1993), American rapper
- Plato of Sakkoudion (c. 735–814), Byzantine saint
- Plato Andros (1921–2008), American football player
- Plato Cacheris (1929–2019), American lawyer
- Plato T. Durham (1873–1930), American academic administrator
- Plato Fludd (fl. 1870–1875), American politician
- Plato (Malinovsky), Metropolitan of Moscow in 1745–1754
- Plato Malozemoff (1909–1997), Russian-American engineer and businessman
- Plato E. Shaw (1883–1947), American historian
- Plato A. Skouras (1930–2004), American film producer
- Plato Tiburtinus, 12th-century Italian mathematician, astronomer and translator
- Plato von Ustinov (1840–1918), Russian-born German hotelier
- George Haimsohn (1925–2003), American photographer

=== Surname ===
- Ann Plato (born c. 1824), Black American author and educator
- Anton-Detlev von Plato (1910–2001), German general
- Burr Plato (c. 1833–1905), Canadian political figure
- Chad Plato (born 1998), Nigerian rugby union player
- Dan Plato (born 1960), South African politician
- Dana Plato (1964–1999), American actress
- Fritz Plato (1858–1938), German chemist
- Jason Plato (born 1967), British racing driver
- Samuel Plato (1882–1957), American architect

== Places ==
- Plato, Saskatchewan, Canada
- Plato, Magdalena, Colombia
  - Plato Airport
- Plato Township, Kane County, Illinois, United States
- Plato, Indiana, United States
- Plato, Iowa, United States
- Plato, Minnesota, United States
- Plato, Missouri, United States
- Plato Island, Antarctica

== Science and technology ==
- Plato (spider), a genus of ray spider
- PLATO (computer system), a computer-assisted instruction system
- PLATO (spacecraft), an ESA space observatory, due to launch in 2027
- Plato (crater), a lunar crater
- 5451 Plato, a main-belt asteroid
- SAM-A-19 Plato, an anti-ballistic missile project
- Plato scale, a scale for the gravity of beer wort and distilled spirits

== Commerce ==
- Platō Coffee, a major coffeehouse chain in South Africa

== Other uses ==
- Plato (film), a 2008 Russian film
- Plato (mythology), a son of Lycaon of Arcadia in Greek mythology
- Plato, a character in Rebel Without a Cause
- PLATO WA, or People Lobbying Against Teaching Outcomes, a Western Australian lobby group

== See also ==
- Play-Doh
- Platon (disambiguation)
- Aflatoon (disambiguation), Arabic form of Plato
