= Metropolitan Platon =

Metropolitan Platon may refer to:

- Platon II (1737–1812) Metropolitan of Moscow
- Platon Atanacković (1788–1867) Serbian Orthodox bishop of Bačka
- Platon Kulbusch (1869–1919) Estonian Orthodox Church bishop of Tallinn and all Estonia
- Platon of Banja Luka (1874–1941) Serbian Orthodox Metropolitan of Sarajevo
- Platon Rozhdestvensky (1866–1934) First Orthodox Church in America Archbishop
- Platon Udovenko (1940–2026) Russian Orthodox Metropolitan Bishop

== See also ==
- Platon
