= Platon Ivanov =

Russian-Finnish civil servant (1863–1939)

Platon Ivanovich Ivanov (surname Livola from 1938 onward) (March 31, 1863 – November 15, 1939) was a Russian-Finnish civil servant. He worked as the head of the Office of the Governor-General of Finland and as a Senator during the second period of Russification of Finland.

== Biography ==
Ivanov was born in Helsinki. His parents were Colonel Ivan Ivanov and Maria Molozemoff. He received his Abitur in 1881, studied Russian in Moscow during 1884–1886, was promoted to the rank of Artillery Sub-Lieutenant in 1889 and finished a course in the Saint Petersburg Law Lyceum.

Ivanov worked as a civil servant in the Czar's Office of Finland in 1901 and as an Elder Deputy Secretary in 1903. In 1903, he also worked as a Provincial Secretary in the Province of Vaasa, then as an assistant for the Finnish Minister Secretary of State from 1904 to 1909 and as the Chancellor's secretary in the Imperial Alexander University in Helsinki. Ivanov became the deputy head of the Office of the Governor General in 1909 and its head in 1911. He was a member of the economic division of the Markov Senate and the head of the Cameral Office of the Senate during 1911–1913. From 1913 to 1917, Ivanov once again worked as an assistant for the Finnish Minister Secretary of State. He received the title of honor of State Councillor in 1906 and finally the title of Actual State Councillor (Todellinen valtioneuvos) in 1910 (see the Imperial Russian Table of Ranks).

After the Russian Revolution and Finland's independence, Ivanov worked as a clerk for manufacturing company Maskin- och Brobyggnads Aktiebolag from 1920 to 1924 and later lived in Daugavpils, Lithuania.

== Personal life and death ==
Platon Ivanov was married to Olga Moltschanov during 1895–1932 and to Sofie Bersenov during the last two years of his life. He died in Helsinki in 1939.

== Sources ==
- University of Helsinki register 1640–1917, section H–O
