= Paimio =

Paimio Pemar
- Town
- Paimion kaupunki Pemars stad
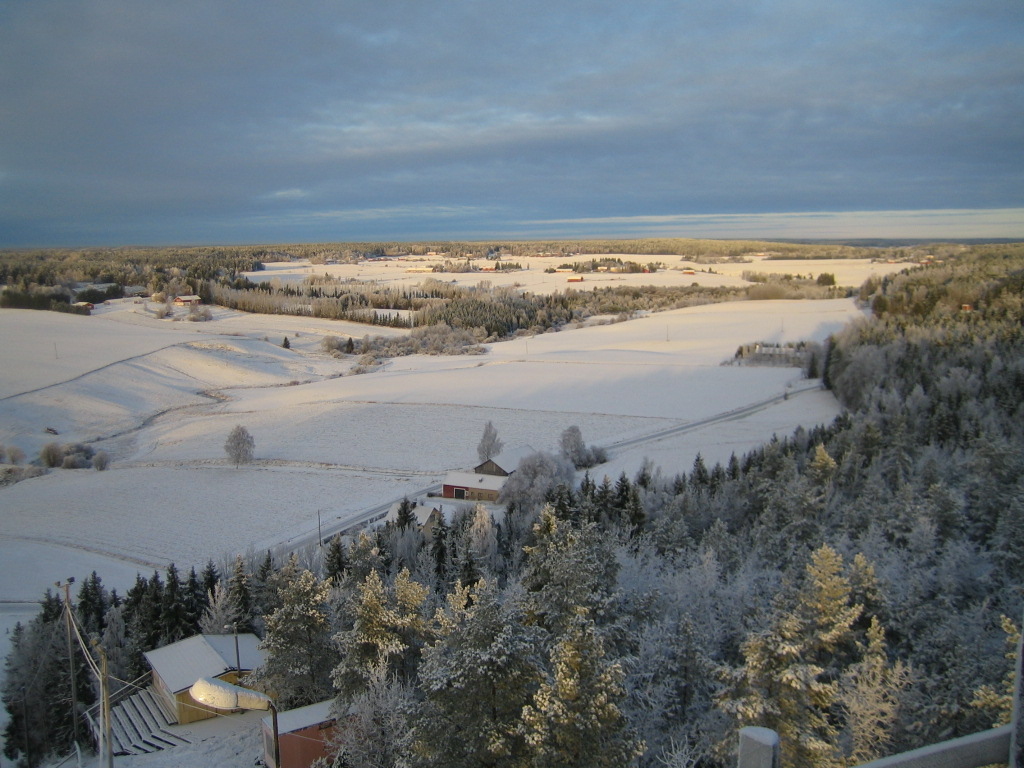

- Coat of arms

- Location of Paimio in Finland
- Interactive map of Paimio
- Coordinates: 60°27′N 022°42′E
- Country: Finland
- Region: Southwest Finland
- Sub-region: Turku sub-region
- City rights: 1997

Government
  - Town manager: Nina-Mari Turpela

Area (2018-01-01)
  - Total: 242.26 km^{2} (93.54 sq mi)
  - Land: 238.52 km^{2} (92.09 sq mi)
  - Water: 3.89 km^{2} (1.50 sq mi)
  - Rank: 250th largest in Finland

Population (2025-12-31)
  - Total: 11,284
  - Rank: 88th largest in Finland
  - Density: 47.31/km^{2} (122.5/sq mi)

Population by native language
  - Finnish: 93.8% (official)
  - Swedish: 0.9%
  - Others: 5.4%

Population by age
  - 0 to 14: 19.1%
  - 15 to 64: 58.6%
  - 65 or older: 22.3%
- Time zone: UTC+02:00 (EET)
  - Summer (DST): UTC+03:00 (EEST)
- Climate: Dfb
- Website: www.paimio.fi/en/

Paimio (Finnish: [ˈpɑi̯mio]; Swedish: Pemar) is a town and municipality of Finland.

It is located in the province of Western Finland and is part of the Southwest Finland region. The municipality has a population of 11,284 (31 December 2025) and covers an area of 242.26 square kilometres (93.54 sq mi) of which 3.89 km^{2} (1.50 sq mi) is water. The population density is 47.31 inhabitants per square kilometre (122.5/sq mi). The municipality is unilingually Finnish.

Paimio centre is called Vista, divided by the church hill to Upper Vista (Ylä-Vista) and Lower Vista (Ala-Vista).

== Important buildings ==
Paimio is best known for Paimio Sanatorium operating as a part of Turku University Hospital. It was built in 1932 and designed by architect Alvar Aalto and originally served as a tuberculosis sanatorium.

== Notable persons ==
- Jarno Koskiranta, ice hockey player
- Tero Koskiranta, ice hockey player
- Mika Ojala, footballer
- Anders Planman, astronomer, professor of physics and mathematician
- Count R. H. Rehbinder, statesman; the Secretary of State for the Grand Duchy
- V. J. Sukselainen, politician

== International relations ==
=== Twin towns — Sister cities ===
Paimio is twinned with:

- Audru Parish, Estonia
- Ljungby Municipality, Sweden
- Zelenogorsk, Russia
- Sovetsky, Russia
- Tølløse, Denmark
- Ås, Norway
- Öckerö Municipality, Sweden
- Odenthal, Germany
