= Călmuș =

- Location within Romania

Location
- Country: Romania
- Counties: Bacău County

Physical characteristics
- Source
  - coordinates: 46°32′38″N 26°31′54″E
  - elevation: 440 m (1,440 ft)
- Mouth: Tazlăul Sărat
  - coordinates: 46°31′37″N 26°36′11″E
  - elevation: 325 m (1,066 ft)
- Length: 7 km (4.3 mi)
- Basin size: 13 km^{2} (5.0 sq mi)

Basin features
- Progression: Tazlăul Sărat→ Tazlău→ Trotuș→ Siret→ Danube→ Black Sea

The Călmuș (also: Calmus) is a left tributary of the river Tazlăul Sărat in Romania. It discharges into the Tazlăul Sărat in Ardeoani. Its length is 7 km (4.3 mi) and its basin size is 13 km^{2} (5.0 sq mi).
