= Șesuri =

Şesuri may refer to several villages in Romania:

- Şesuri, a village in Măgirești Commune, Bacău County
- Şesuri, a village in Bucureșci Commune, Hunedoara County
- Şesuri, a village in Cârlibaba Commune, Suceava County
