= Zemeș (river) =

- Location within Romania

Location
- Country: Romania
- Counties: Bacău County

Physical characteristics
- Source: Mount Runcul Rău
  - location: Tarcău Mountains
  - coordinates: 46°32′24″N 26°25′00″E
  - elevation: 889 m (2,917 ft)
- Mouth: Tazlăul Sărat
  - coordinates: 46°32′04″N 26°28′12″E
  - elevation: 512 m (1,680 ft)
- Length: 6 km (3.7 mi)
- Basin size: 12 km^{2} (4.6 sq mi)

Basin features
- Progression: Tazlăul Sărat→ Tazlău→ Trotuș→ Siret→ Danube→ Black Sea

The Zemeș is a right tributary of the river Tazlăul Sărat in Romania. It discharges into the Tazlăul Sărat in the village Zemeș. Its length is 6 km (3.7 mi) and its basin size is 12 km^{2} (4.6 sq mi).
