= Hartranft (surname) =

Hartranft is a German surname. It originates from Middle High German harte (hard) and ranft (rind, crust) and referred to a pauper. Notable people with the surname include:

- Chester David Hartranft (1839–1914), American educator
- Glenn Hartranft (1901–1970), American Olympic athlete and college sports coach
- John F. Hartranft (1830–1899), American politician and military general
- M.V. Hartranft (1872?–1945), American agriculturalist, land developer, and railway executive
- Priscilla Ahn (born 1984), born Priscilla Natalie Hartranft
- Ray Hartranft (1890–1955), American baseball player
