= Aflatoon =

Aflatoon (also Aflatun or Aflatoun) may refer to:

- Aflāṭūn (أفلاطون), the Arabic form of the name Plato
  - Aflatoon, a Hindustani (Hindi-Urdu) colloquial term for a pompous or eccentric person
- Aflatoon (1997 film), an Indian film
- Aflatoon (2023 film), an Indian Marathi-language comedy-drama film
- Aflatoun, a non-governmental organization headquartered in Amsterdam, Netherlands
- Aflatun, the Kyrgyzstani name for the village Avletim
- Aflatun Amashov, politician and journalist in Azerbaijan

== See also ==
- Plato (disambiguation)
