= Ruja (Tazlăul Sărat) =

- Location within Romania

Location
- Country: Romania
- Counties: Bacău County

Physical characteristics
- Source
  - coordinates: 46°30′49″N 26°30′50″E
  - elevation: 496 m (1,627 ft)
- Mouth: Tazlăul Sărat
  - location: Șesuri
  - coordinates: 46°30′42″N 26°34′40″E
  - elevation: 345 m (1,132 ft)
- Length: 8 km (5.0 mi)
- Basin size: 13 km^{2} (5.0 sq mi)

Basin features
- Progression: Tazlăul Sărat→ Tazlău→ Trotuș→ Siret→ Danube→ Black Sea

The Ruja is a left tributary of the river Tazlăul Sărat in Romania. It discharges into the Tazlăul Sărat in Șesuri. Its length is 8 km (5.0 mi) and its basin size is 13 km^{2} (5.0 sq mi).
