= Geamăna oil field =

Oil field in Bacău County, Romania

Geamăna
- Country: Romania
- Region: Bacău County
- Offshore/onshore: onshore
- Operator: Petrom

Field history
- Discovery: 2000
- Start of development: 2001
- Start of production: 2001

Production
- Current production of oil: 3,000 barrels per day (~1.5×10^{5} t/a)
- Estimated oil in place: 6.8 million tonnes (~ 8×10^{6} m^{3} or 50 million bbl)

The Geamăna oil field is an oil field located in Zemeș, Bacău County. It was discovered in 2000 and developed by Petrom. It began production in 2001 and produces oil. The total proven reserves of the Geamăna oil field are around 50 million barrels (6.18 million tonnes), and production is centered on 3,000 barrels per day (480 m^{3}/d).
