= Agrikolyansky =

Agrikolyansky (Russian: Агриколянский; masculine) or Agrikolyanskaya (Агриколянская; feminine) is a Russian surname originated in clergy, artificially created from the Latin word meaning rural. Notable people with the surname include:

- Platon Agrikolyansky (1772–1864), archimandrite of the Russian Orthodox Church , Orthodox missionary and spiritual writer.
