= Eugen Chirnoagă =

Romanian chemist (1891–1965)

- Born: March 28, 1891; Poduri, Bacău County, Kingdom of Romania
- Died: June 14, 1965 (aged 74)
- Education: University of Bucharest; University of London
- Spouse: Eugenia Chirnoagă
- Children: Marcel Chirnoagă
- Scientific career
- Fields: Chemistry
- Workplaces: Politehnica University of Bucharest
- Thesis: Catalytic decomposition of hypochlorite solutions by finely divided metallic oxides (1925)

Eugen Chirnoagă (24 March 1891–June 14, 1965) was a Romanian chemist.

Chirnoagă was born in 1891 in Poduri, Bacău County, one of eight children of Gheorghe Chirnoagă, a teacher, and his wife, Olimpia; one of his brothers, Platon Chirnoagă, became a general in World War II.

A graduate of the Physics and Chemistry Faculty of the University of Bucharest, he followed up his undergraduate education with three years of study at the University of London that led to a doctorate in 1925. In 1926 he went to study the colloid chemistry of proteins with Nobel laureate Theodor Svedberg at Uppsala University. At his Nobel lecture in 1927, Svedberg mentioned Chirnoagă's contribution to the development of the ultracentrifuge.

After returning to Romania, he became a professor at the Bucharest Polytechnic. He was elected corresponding member of the Romanian Academy of Sciences (Chemistry section) on 21 December 1935, and became titular member on 3 June 1941.

A prominent member of the Iron Guard, his term as rector of the Polytechnic roughly coincided with the time the Guard spent in power under the National Legionary State: October 9, 1940 to January 27, 1941. During this period, one committee, led by University of Bucharest rector Petre P. Panaitescu, examined the views of professors nationwide, its objective being the firing of those with anti-Nazi views. A similar committee, led by Chirnoagă, targeted the staff of specialized universities. Upon the outbreak of the Legionnaires' rebellion that would end with the Guard's fall from power, its leader Horia Sima sent Panaitescu and Chirnoagă to negotiate with Conducător Ion Antonescu. The latter showed himself open to concessions, which led Sima to formulate demands he found unacceptable. After the Coup of August 1944 and the fall of Antonescu, a purging committee was set up at the Polytechnic in the autumn of 1944. The following May, this committee removed Chirnoagă from his position as professor.

Upon his death in 1965, he was cremated. His wife, Eugenia Chirnoagă, was also a chemist; his son, Marcel Chirnoagă, became a painter and engraver.

== Publications ==
- Chirnoagă, Eugen (1925). Catalytic decomposition of hypochlorite solutions by finely divided metallic oxides (Thesis). University of London. ProQuest 301141958.
- Svedberg, The; Chirnoagă, Eugen (1928). "The molecular weight of hemocyanin". Journal of the American Chemical Society. 50 (5): 1399–1411. doi:10.1021/ja01392a024. ISSN 0002-7863.
- Chirnoagă, Eugen (1935). "Neue Indikatoren für argentometrische Titrierungen". Analytical and Bioanalytical Chemistry (in German). 101 (1–2): 31–38. doi:10.1007/bf01395241. ISSN 1618-2642. S2CID 92435719.
