= Fedor Rodichev =

Russian politician and lawyer (1854–1933)

- Федор Родичев
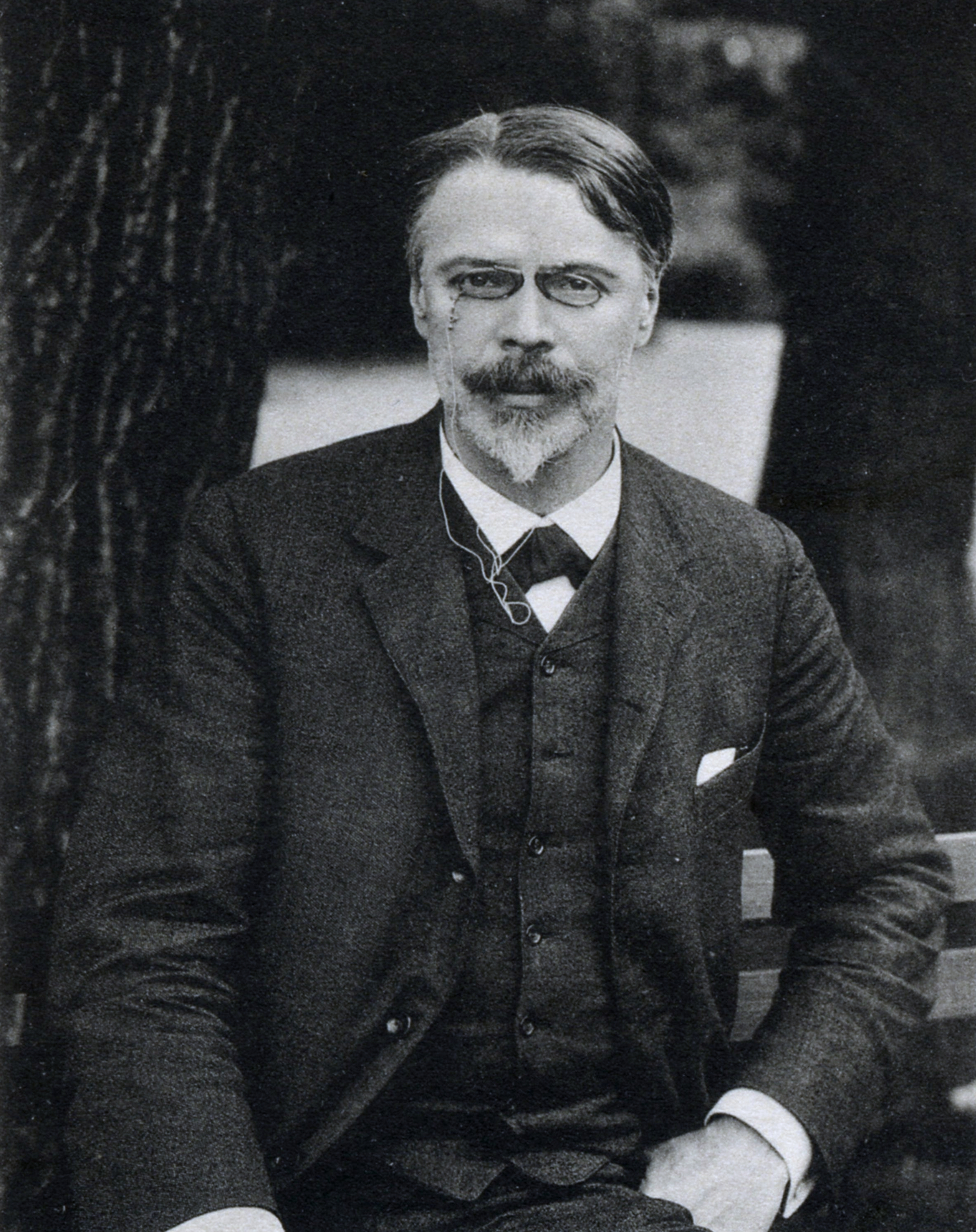
- Rodichev in 1906

Minister for Finnish Affairs under the Provisional Government
- In office March 19, 1917 – April 8, 1917
- Preceded by: Vladimir Markov
- Succeeded by: Carl Enckell

Member of the Provisional Committee of Duma
- In office March 12, 1917 – March 15, 1917

Personal details
- Born: Fedor Izmailovich Rodichev; February 9, 1854 St. Petersburg, Russian Empire
- Died: February 28, 1933 (aged 79) Lausanne, Switzerland
- Resting place: Bois-de-Vaux Cemetery
- Party: Constitutional Democratic Party
- Spouse: Katerina Svechina (m. 1880)
- Children: 2
- Education: St. Petersburg University
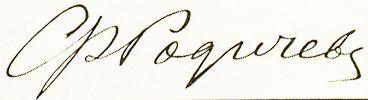
- Signature

Fedor Izmailovich Rodichev (Russian: Федор Измайлович Родичев, February 9, 1854 – February 28, 1933) was a Russian politician and lawyer. A member and one of the leaders of the Constitutional Democratic Party, he was also a member in the Provisional Council of the Russian Republic in 1917.

== Early life and education ==
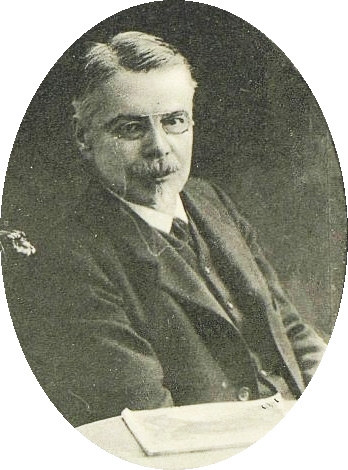
Rodichev in 1910

Fyodor Izmailovich Rodichev was born on February 9, 1854, in St. Petersburg, Russian Empire (Note: Vesyegonsk District of the Tver province according to some sources) to parents Izmail Dmitrievich and Sofya Nikolaevna (née Ushakova). His father was a member of the Tver Provincial Zemstvo.

Rodichev studied and graduated at the first St. Petersburg Vocational Gymnasium in 1870. He then studied Faculty of Law at the St. Petersburg University, where he graduated in 1876.

== Career ==
Rodichev was appointed as a member of the Provisional Committee of Duma in March 1917 for a short period of time. He was also appointed acting Minister for the Finnish Affairs under the Russian Provisional Government, where he preceded Vladimir Markov.

During this time, he participated in the White movement in Southern Russian in the October Revolution. He was then succeeded by Carl Enckell in April of the same year.

== Personal life and death ==
Rodichev met and married Katerina Aleksandrovna Svechina in sometime in 1880. They later had two daughters; Sofiia Bernatskaia and Aleksandra Rodicheva.

After the October Revolution, Finland declared its independence from Russia in 1917. Rodichev hence went into exile to Lausanne, Switzerland with his family. Rodichev died in Lausanne on February 28, 1933. He was 79. He was later buried in the Bois-de-Vaux cemetery.
