= Poduri =

- Commune
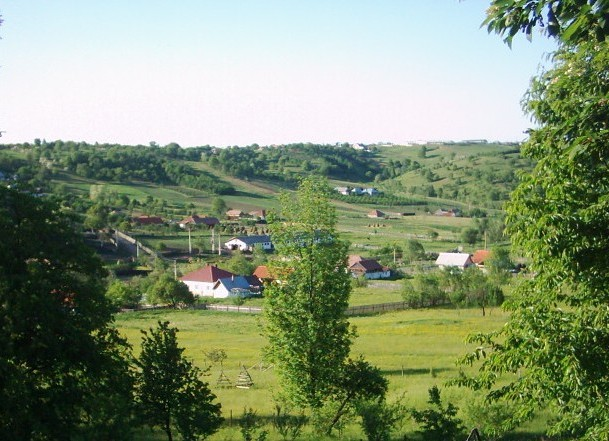
- Șopa, a hamlet in Valea Șoșii

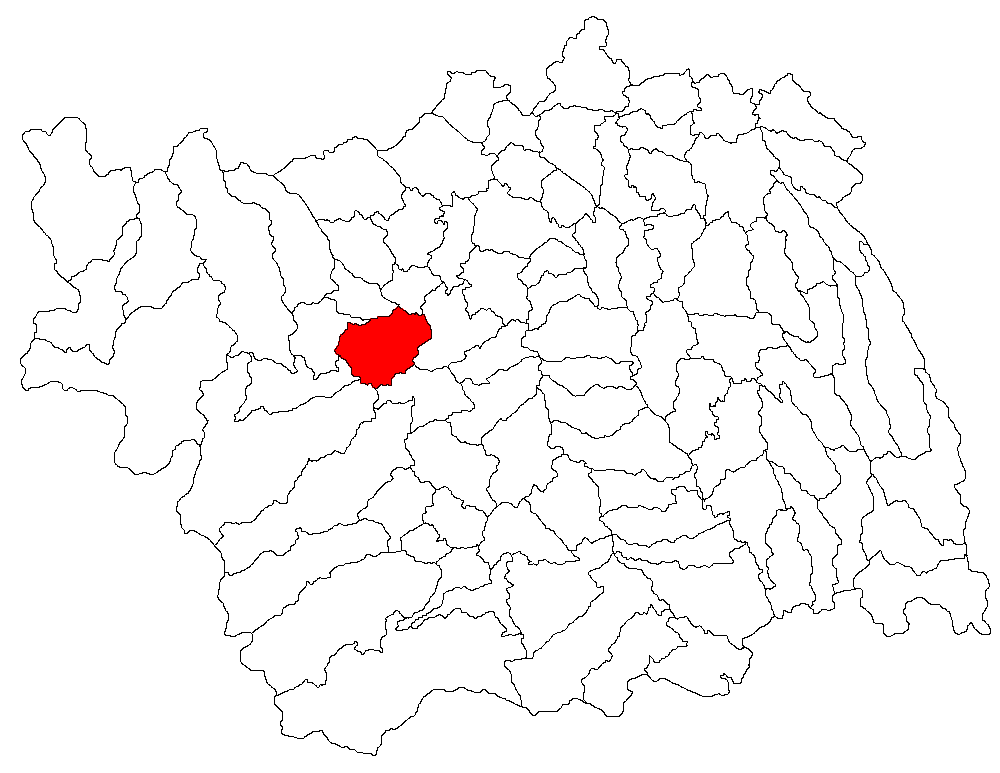
- Location in Bacău County

- Location in Romania
- Country: Romania
- County: Bacău

Government
  - Mayor (2024–2028): Diana-Narcisa Miclăuș (PSD)
- Area: 72.7 km^{2} (28.1 sq mi)
- Elevation: 436 m (1,430 ft)
- Population (2021-12-01): 7,367
  - Density: 101/km^{2} (262/sq mi)
- Time zone: UTC+02:00 (EET)
  - Summer (DST): UTC+03:00 (EEST)
- Postal code: 607465
- Area code: +(40) 234
- Vehicle reg.: BC
- Website: primariapoduri.ro

Poduri is a commune in Bacău County, Western Moldavia, Romania. It is composed of seven villages: Bucșești, Cernu, Cornet, Negreni, Poduri, Prohozești, and Valea Șoșii.

The Poduri archeological site of the Late Neolithic Cucuteni-Trypillian culture is significant due to its thirteen habitation levels that were constructed on top of each other over many years.

== Geography ==
Poduri sits in the central-western part of the county, on the right bank of the Tazlăul Sărat river. It lies around 4 km (2.5 mi) southeast of the nearest town, Moinești, and 66 km (41 mi) from the county seat, Bacău. It is crossed by county road DJ117, which links west of Moinești (where it ends in DN2G) and south of Berzunți and Livezi (where it ends in DN11).

== Natives ==
- Eugen Chirnoagă (1891–1965), chemist
- Platon Chirnoagă (1894–1974), brigadier-general during World War II
- Nicolae Ghineraru (1888–1969), brigadier-general during World War II
- Petre Grigoraș (born 1964), footballer
