= Hartford International University for Religion and Peace =

Theological college in Hartford, Connecticut, US

- Former names: Hartford Theological Seminary; Hartford Seminary Foundation; Hartford Seminary
- Type: Private theological university
- Established: 1833; 193 years ago
- Religious affiliation: Non-denominational
- Endowment: $47.9 million (2019)
- President: Sherry L. Turner
- Total staff: 21
- Students: 92
- Location: Hartford, Connecticut, United States; 41.7699°N 72.7076°W
- Campus: 35 acres (14 ha)
- Website: www.hartfordinternational.edu

The Hartford International University for Religion and Peace (formerly Hartford Seminary) is a private theological university in Hartford, Connecticut.

== History ==
Hartford Seminary's origins date back to 1833 when the Pastoral Union of Connecticut was formed to train Congregational ministers. The next year the Theological Institute of Connecticut was founded at East Windsor Hill, Connecticut. The institution moved to Hartford in 1865 and officially took the name Hartford Theological Seminary in 1885. The Bible Normal College affiliated with the seminary in 1902 and changed its name to Hartford School of Religious Pedagogy. The Kennedy School of Missions became another affiliated activity, originally organized by the Seminary as a separate organization in 1911. In 1913, these three endeavors were combined. In 1961, the entities were legally merged and adopted the new name Hartford Seminary Foundation, which was used until 1981, when the simpler name "Hartford Seminary" came into use.

The Hartford Seminary Foundation published the Hartford Quarterly (originally named Bulletin – Hartford Seminary Foundation) from 1960 to 1968.

Hartford Seminary began to offer niche concentrations in Christian-Muslim dialogue in 1972, and in 1990 Hartford Seminary officially claimed non-denominational status. On Jan. 1, 2018, the Hartford Seminary joined the Boston Theological Interreligious Consortium (BTI), which is the largest theological consortium in the world.

In October 2021, Hartford Seminary officially changed its name to the Hartford International University for Religion and Peace. The change was intended to better reflect its focus on interfaith dialogue. The university's logo was also updated.

== Hartford campus ==
- Hartford Seminary Foundation
- U.S. National Register of Historic Places
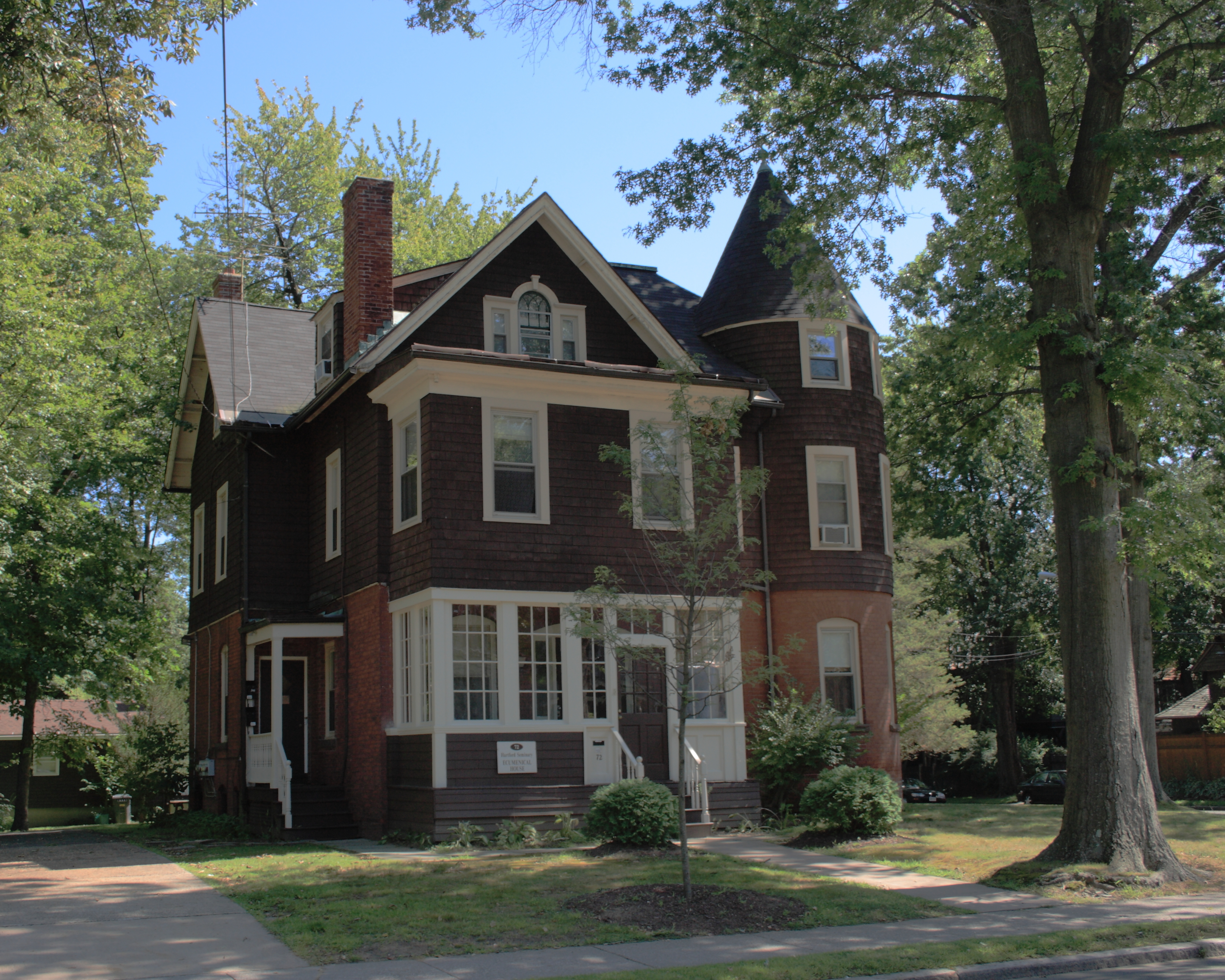
- Hartford Seminary

- Location within Connecticut
- Location: 55 Elizabeth St. and 72-120 Sherman St., Hartford, Connecticut
- Area: 25 acres (10 ha)
- Built: 1875
- Architect: Charles Collens
- Architectural style: Late Gothic Revival, Queen Anne, Neo-Tudor
- NRHP reference No.: 82004411
- Added to NRHP: June 22, 1982

When the seminary moved to Hartford in 1865, it was at first located in the area now occupied by buildings of the Wadsworth Atheneum. In the 1910s, it planned a dedicated new campus on Hartford's west side, south of Elizabeth Street. Construction was delayed by World War I, and a handsome campus of Collegiate Gothic Revival buildings was constructed in the 1920s. Surviving elements of this construction phase were used by the seminary until 1981, and currently constitute the campus of the University of Connecticut School of Law. The present main seminary building, designed by architect Richard Meier, was completed in 1981, replacing several buildings demolished from the initial building phase. The seminary also continues to occupy several adjacent buildings that have historically been part of its campus. These, as well as the law school, were listed on the National Register of Historic Places in 1982, primarily for their architecture.

== Academics ==
Hartford International University is centered on two academic units: the Hartford Institute for Religion Research and the Duncan Black Macdonald Center for the Study of Islam and Christian-Muslim Relations, the country’s oldest center for such study, having opened in 1973. The seminary offers certificate programs and graduate degrees up to the doctoral level, including the only accredited Islamic chaplaincy program.

== The Muslim World ==
Hartford International University has been home to The Muslim World since 1938, an academic journal dedicated to the promotion and dissemination of scholarly research on Islam and Muslim societies and on historical and current aspects of Christian-Muslim relations. The journal was founded in 1911, and is edited and published quarterly.

== Notable alumni ==
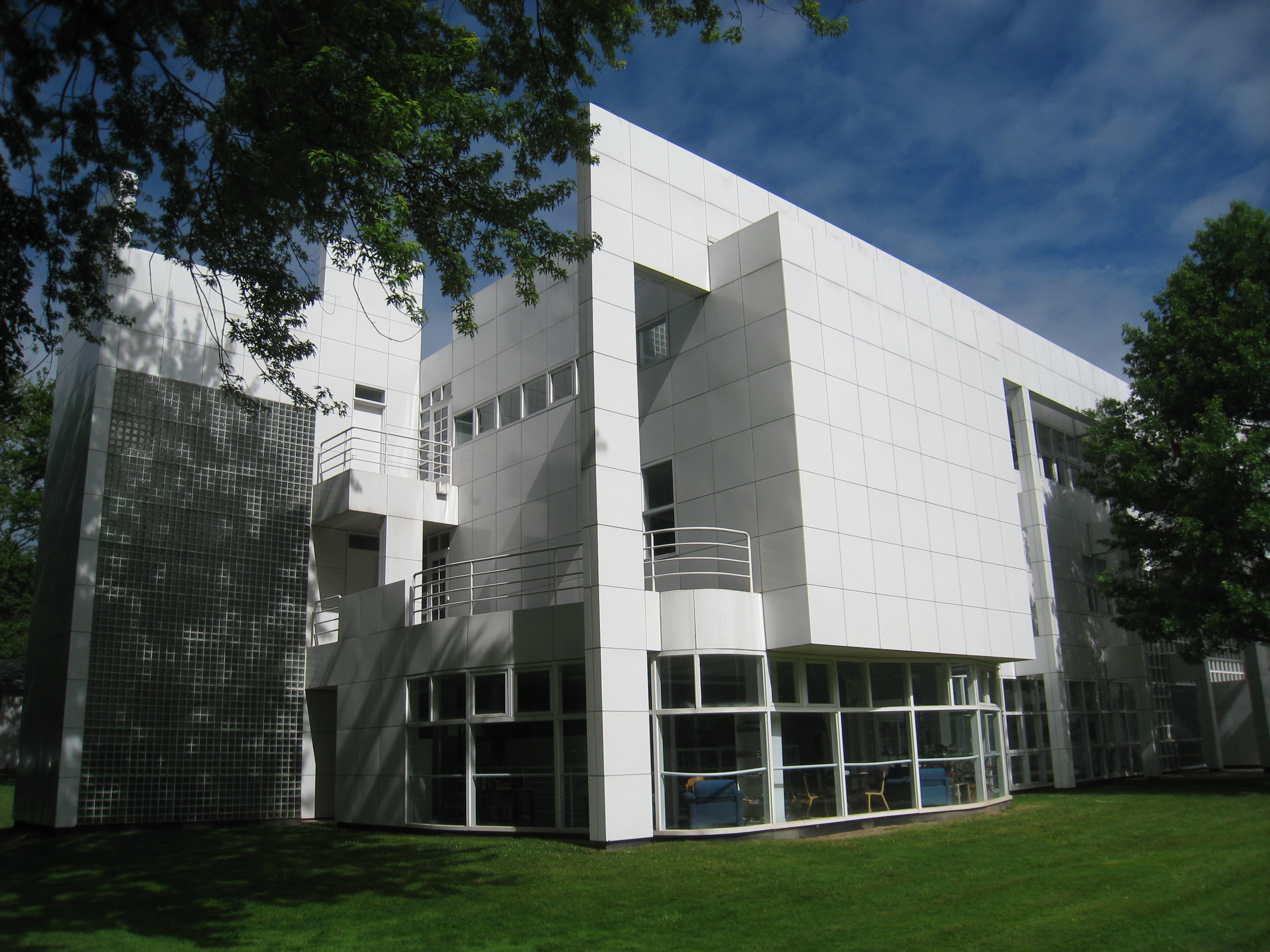
Hartford Seminary

- Akaiko Akana, first pastor of Hawaiian ancestry at Kawaiahaʻo Church
- Fred Hovey Allen, clergyman and author, made first photogravure plates in U.S.
- Thomas L. Angell, scholar at Bates College
- Frank Buchman, Lutheran minister and missionary who founded the First Century Christian Fellowship in 1921, later known as the Oxford Group and transformed by him into Moral Re-Armament in 1938.
- Dosia Carlson, United Church of Christ minister and hymnwriter
- Asnage Castelly, Haitian-American wrestler who competed for Haiti at the 2016 Summer Olympics in the 74 kg freestyle competition.
- Henry Allan Gleason Jr., linguist
- Yvonne Y. Haddad, Professor of the History of Islam and Christian-Muslim Relations at Georgetown University
- Yahya Hendi, Georgetown University Muslim chaplain, named one of the world's most influential Muslims in 2012.
- Fenwicke Holmes, Religious Science leader
- Fred Kirschenmann, leader in the sustainable agriculture movement
- Charles H. Kraft, missionary, linguist, missiologist and deliverance minister
- Vergel L. Lattimore, professor at the Methodist Theological School in Ohio
- Rachel Taylor Milton, first African-American woman alumni, co-founder of the Urban League of Greater Hartford and Connecticut Women's Hall of Fame inductee
- Richard T. Nolan, Episcopal Church/USA canon, writer, professor of philosophy and religious studies emeritus
- Beverly Daniel Tatum, President, Spelman College
- Walt Wolfram, Sociolinguist and professor of linguistics
- Andrew Young, pastor, mayor of Atlanta, U.S. Congressman, UN ambassador, President of the National Council of Churches USA, and member of the Southern Christian Leadership Conference (SCLC)
- Alexander Marthoma Valiya Metropolitan, Metropolitan of the Marthoma Church

== Notable faculty ==
- Chester David Hartranft
- Hossein Kamaly
- Edward A. Lawrence Sr.
- Karl Löwith
- Ingrid Mattson (1998–2012)
- Plato E. Shaw
- Miriam Therese Winter
