= Woldemar von Daehn =

Finnish military officer and statesman (1838–1900)

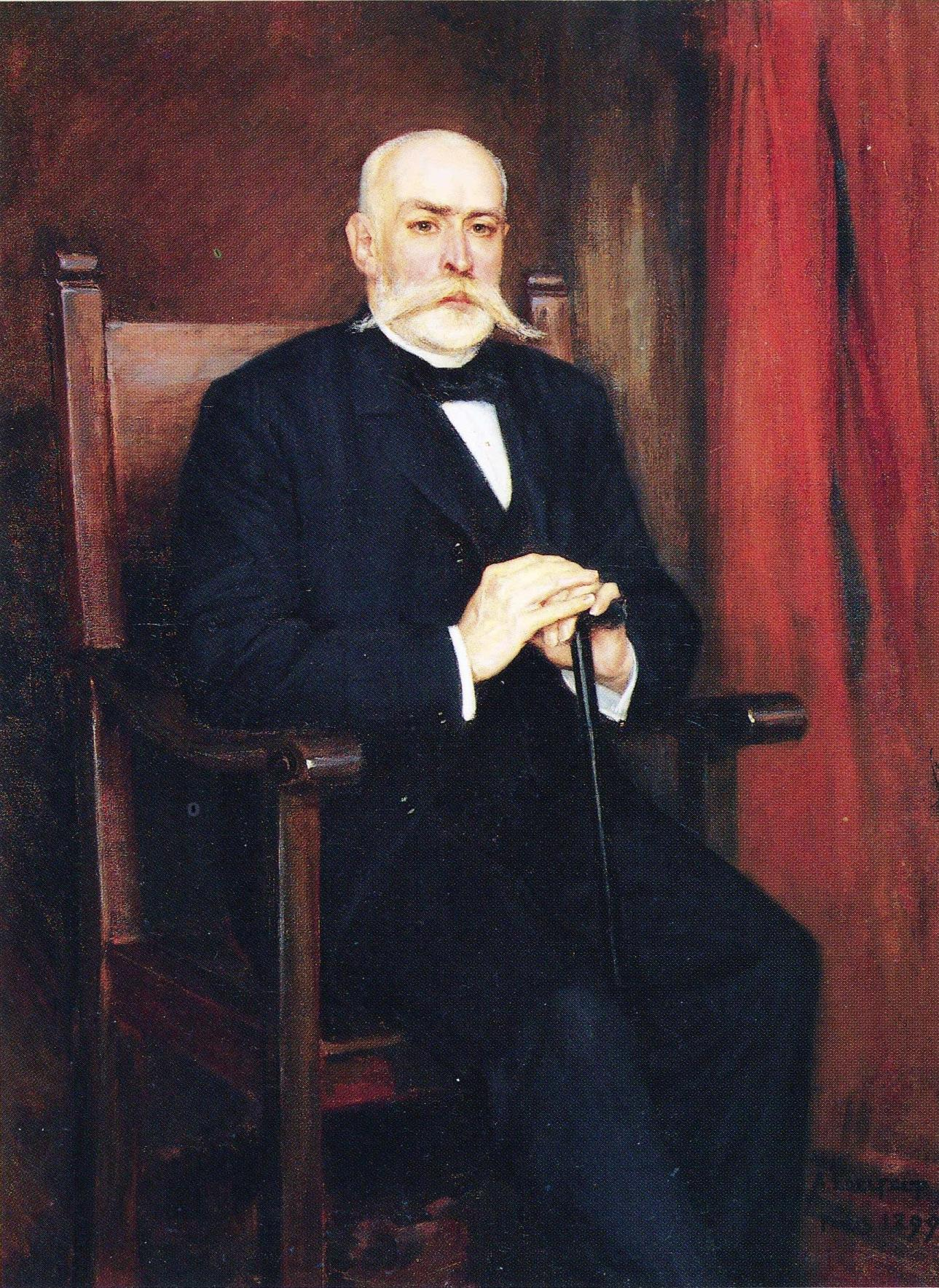
- Portrait by Albert Edelfelt, 1899
- Born: Woldemar Carl von Daehn; 20 February 1838; Sippola, Grand Duchy of Finland, Russian Empire
- Died: 28 December 1900 (aged 62); Rome, Italy
- Resting place: Cimitero Acattolico, Rome
- Occupations: Military officer, statesman
- Office: Governor of Viborg Province (1882–1885); Senator (1885–1889); Minister–Secretary of State for Finland (1891–1898)
- Spouse: Princess Nina Svyatopolk-Mirsky (m. 1871)
- Parent(s): Alexander Gustaf von Daehn; Maria Charlotta Amalia von Wilde

Woldemar Carl von Daehn (20 February 1838 – 28 December 1900) was a Finnish military officer and statesman. He served for more than twenty years as an officer in the Imperial Russian Army, eventually attaining the rank of General of the Infantry. After his return to Finland in 1882 he was Governor of Viborg Province (1882–1885), Senator and Head of the Civil Expedition (1885–1889), and Minister–Secretary of State for Finland (1891–1898). When Alexander III died in 1894, von Daehn acted swiftly to obtain a regency assurance from the new emperor Nicholas II, securing imperial recognition of Finland's special constitutional status.

== Biography ==
=== Family background ===
The von Daehn family originated in Braunschweig in Germany, but von Daehn's great-grandfather had entered Russian service. His grandfather became a landowner in Finland in 1784, when through his wife's family connections he obtained the right to redeem the Sippola estate in Anjala. The grandfather's sons Johan, Alexander, and Karl were introduced to the Finnish House of Nobility in 1836.

Von Daehn's father, Alexander Gustaf von Daehn, was a successful farmer; his mother, Maria Charlotta Amalia von Wilde, was also of German descent. Woldemar was the second youngest of six children. After the father's death, the Sippola estate passed to the eldest son, Alexander.

=== Military career ===
Like two of his older brothers, von Daehn attended the Hamina Cadet School. From 1857 to 1860 he served as a junior officer in the Life Guards' Finnish Sharpshooter Battalion in Helsinki. From 1860 to 1862 he studied at the Nicholas General Staff Academy in Saint Petersburg, after which he sought military service in the Caucasus, where Finnish officers were valued in the Russian army as loyal professional soldiers. There he rose to the rank of colonel. In 1871 he married Princess Nina Svyatopolk-Mirsky, a member of the Svyatopolk-Mirsky family, who claimed descent from the legendary founder of the Russian state, Rurik.

In 1873 an accident changed the course of his career. He was riding alongside the Caucasian viceroy, Grand Duke Mikhail Nikolayevich, when the carriage horses bolted. Von Daehn managed to calm the horses, but his foot was crushed in the process and he walked with a severe limp for the rest of his life. This brought his career as a field officer to an end. After serving as governor of Stavropol and being promoted to major general in 1878, he was offered the opportunity to return to Finland.

=== Return to Finland ===
In January 1882, von Daehn was appointed Governor of Viborg Province. In leading circles in Finland, the returning general attracted attention: at 45 he was still strikingly handsome, and his erudition and quick grasp of matters were soon noted, as was his earlier popularity at the imperial court. His reticence and reserve stood in marked contrast to his imposing appearance, which earned him the nickname "the Sphinx".

After his return, von Daehn aligned himself with the Fennoman (Finnish nationalist) cause, demonstrating this by registering with the Finnish-language parish in Vyborg, although Finnish was probably the language he commanded least well of the several he spoke. He found the Swedish-nationalist Svecoman tendency alien, and was also estranged from the constitutionalist line championed by Leo Mechelin. The Fennomans themselves, however, considered him too independent-minded.

=== Senator 1885–1889 ===
In 1885 von Daehn was appointed Head of the Civil Expedition and member of the Senate of Finland. In the Senate he aligned with the Fennomans, but on many issues he followed his own line. He was most consistent in opposing Mechelin, even though the two had been friends since childhood — Mechelin's father had been von Daehn's teacher at the Cadet School. In von Daehn's view, Mechelin's campaign to assert Finland's status as a separate state was harmful, needlessly awakening "the sleeping bear".

The rivalry between Mechelin and von Daehn was illustrated in 1888 by the handling of Governor-General Fyodor Heiden's proposal to reform the Senate. During the plenary session, von Daehn unexpectedly proposed that some of the reforms Mechelin himself had outlined the previous year should be implemented, thereby — as a former general staff officer — giving Mechelin a lesson in tactics by forcing him to vote against his own plans.

In February 1889, von Daehn was appointed Deputy to the Minister–Secretary of State in Saint Petersburg. He used his initial period in the office to study the archives concerning Finland's constitutional status.

=== The crisis years 1888–1891 ===
Disagreements between the government of Alexander III and the administrative bodies of Finland intensified between 1888 and 1891. The proposal to merge the postal and customs services and financial institutions of Finland and Russia led to the merger of the Finnish postal service with the Russian by Alexander III's Postal Manifesto of 12 June 1890. Because Minister–Secretary of State Casimir Ehrnrooth was ill, von Daehn as his deputy was obliged to countersign the manifesto.

Following the manifesto, von Daehn received an anonymous letter containing a copy of Runeberg's poem Sveaborg, the message of which — "He who has betrayed his country has no kin, no stock, no son, no father" — was readily understood. In defiance, von Daehn published a notice of thanks for the package in the newspaper Nya Pressen, as he "had no other means than the newspapers to thank the brave patriot" who had failed to include a name and address.

Another source of conflict was the dispute over the criminal code. Alexander III decided to postpone the entry into force of the already enacted Finnish criminal code, as Russian experts considered that Finland had unilaterally extended its scope onto Russian territory. As a consequence Ehrnrooth was forced to request his dismissal. In 1891 von Daehn was appointed Minister–Secretary of State, now bearing the principal responsibility for restoring agreement between Finland and Russia.

=== Minister–Secretary of State 1891–1898 ===
As a realpolitician, von Daehn defended Finnish interests without seeking unnecessary confrontation with the Russian government. He had to contend with several conflicts seen as reductions of Finnish autonomy during the 1890s, including disputes concerning criminal law and Finland's constitutional status — questions which, although not resolved during Alexander III's lifetime or in the early years of Nicholas II's reign, remained, in von Daehn's own words, "a sword of Damocles" hanging over Finland.

When Alexander III died on 1 November 1894, von Daehn acted immediately. On the same day he telegraphed the new emperor to request an audience, and once this was granted he travelled at once to Livadia in Crimea and obtained Nicholas II's signature on a regency assurance for Finland. By acting swiftly, von Daehn forestalled the political crisis that many had feared.

==== Chancellor of the University ====
Together with the appointment as Minister–Secretary of State, von Daehn was also appointed acting Chancellor of the University. As Chancellor he took particular interest in agricultural education, and his major achievement was the establishment of a department of agricultural economics, later the Faculty of Agriculture and Forestry. Through imperial decrees in 1896 and 1898 he succeeded in transferring the right to appoint professors from the emperor to the Chancellor.

==== Resignation ====
Von Daehn had submitted requests to resign on grounds of ill health toward the end of 1897 and again in April 1898. When he finished his regular briefing for the emperor at Tsarskoye Selo on 8 June 1898, Nicholas II asked whether he had brought his resignation request for signing. He had not, and he suggested that it would be more appropriate for his deputy, General Victor Procopé, to present the matter. The resignation was granted on Procopé's submission on 11 June 1898, with the emperor adding the words "and with gratitude" to an unusually warm imperial rescript. A week later von Daehn was also discharged from military service and promoted to General of the Infantry.

=== Later years and death ===
After his resignation, von Daehn first settled at Sippola, which he had inherited following his brother Alexander's death in 1894. He soon sold the estate — along with the valuable library he had actively built up — and in 1899 went abroad with his wife and daughter, never to return. He died in Rome at the age of 62 on 28 December 1900 and is buried in the Non-Catholic Cemetery in Rome.

All five of his children died without issue. The youngest son, Peter, who like his elder brother attained the rank of colonel by 1917, moved to Rome after the Russian Revolution, where as the last male member of the family he died in 1971; the von Daehn family was thereupon registered as extinct in the Finnish House of Nobility.

== Gallery ==
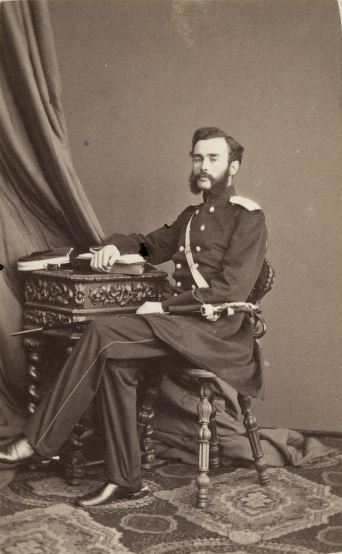
Von Daehn as a staff captain, 1861–1863, Saint Petersburg

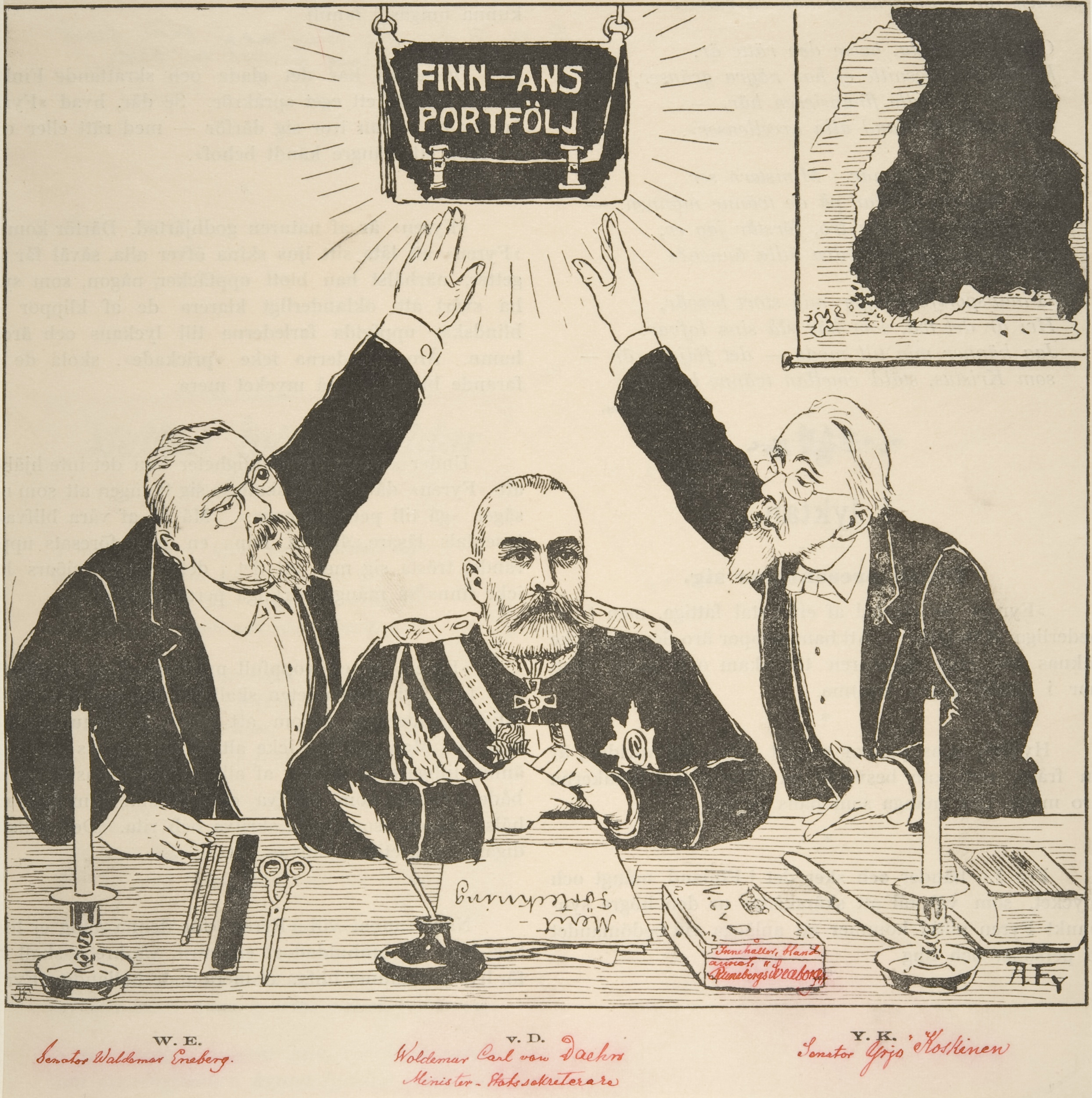
Political cartoon by Alex Federley, 1891: von Daehn criticised by senators for signing the 1890 Postal Manifesto

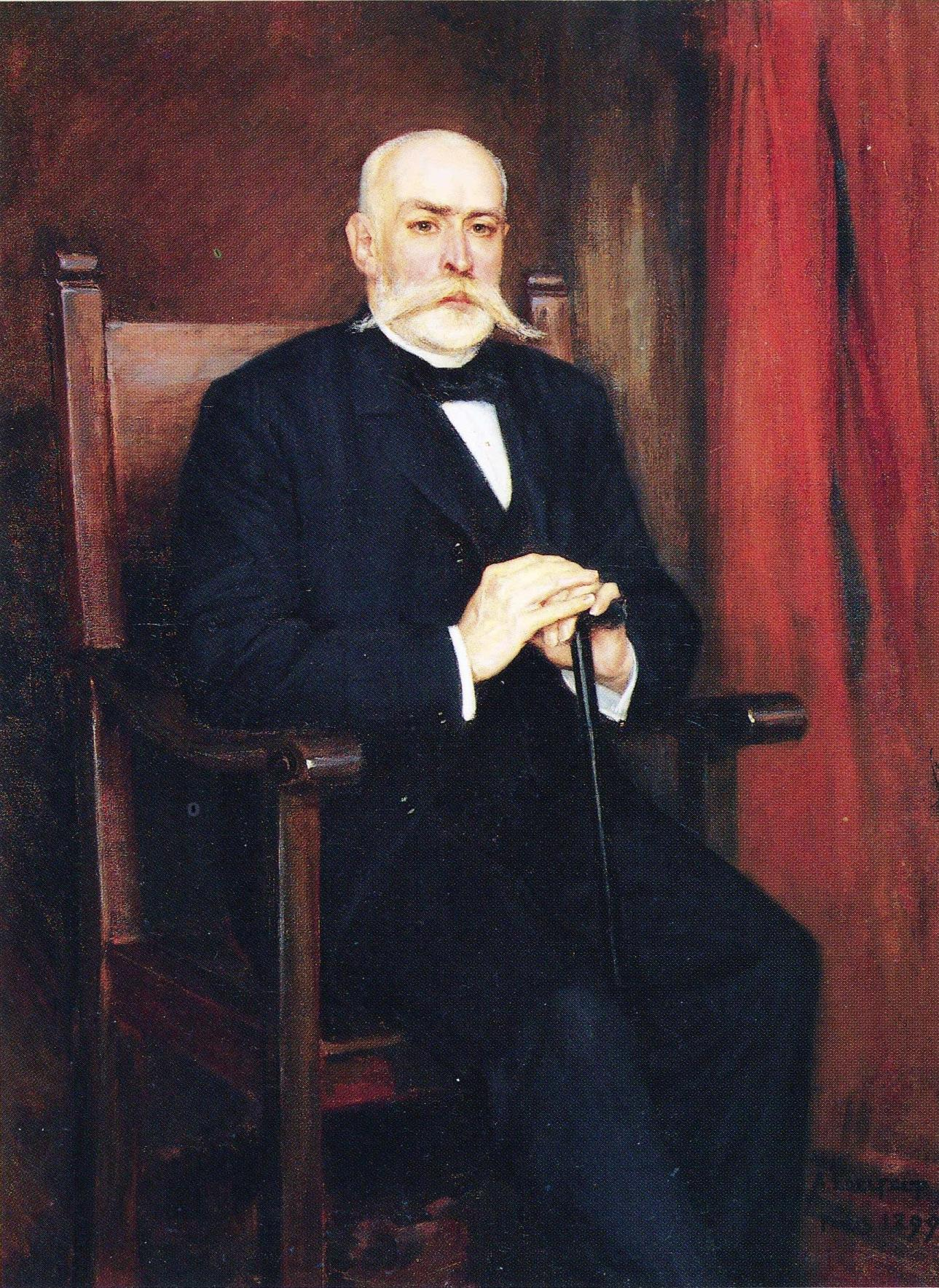
Woldemar von Daehn, Albert Edelfelt, 1899
