= Hossein Kamaly =

Iranian literary scholar

- حسین کمالی
- Awards: Richard Hofstadter Fellowship

Academic background
- Education: Columbia University (MA, PhD), New York University (MSc), Shahid Beheshti University (BSc)

Academic work
- Discipline: Islamic studies scholar
- Institutions: Hartford International University
- Main interests: Quranic Studies; Shia Studies; Islamic Studies; Interfaith Interpretive Traditions; Theology; Philosophy of Religion; Deontic Logic; Intellectual History; Literature

Hossein Kamaly is an Iranian scholar and Professor of Islamic Studies and Interreligious Studies at Hartford International University where he holds the Imam Ali Chair in Shia Studies and Dialogue Among Islamic Schools of Thought. Previously, he taught at Barnard College, Columbia University.

== Books ==
- God & Man in Tehran: Contending Visions of the Divine from the Qajars to the Islamic Republic, Columbia University Press 2018
- A History of Islam in 21 Women, Oneworld Publications 2019
