= Robert Henrik Rehbinder =

Finnish politician (1811–1841)

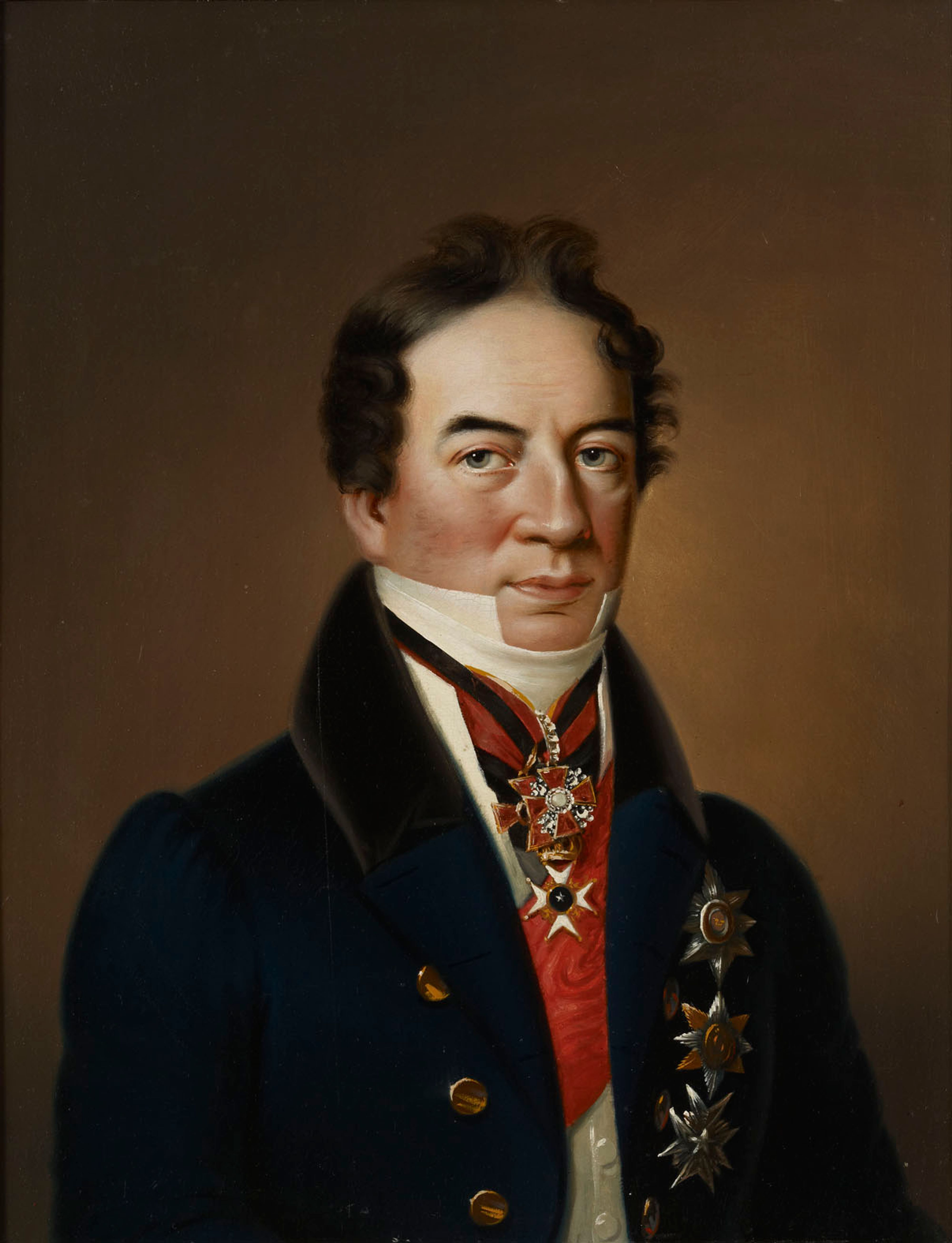
- Rehbinder depicted in an oil painting by J. E. Lindh

Secretary of State for the Grand Duchy of Finland

Privy Councillor
- In office 1811–1841
- Preceded by: Mikhail Speransky
- Succeeded by: Alexander Armfelt

Personal details
- Born: 15 July 1777 Paimio, Finland
- Died: 8 March 1841 (aged 63) Saint Petersburg, Russian Empire
- Education: University of Helsinki

Count Robert Henrik Rehbinder (15 July 1777 – 8 March 1841) was a Finnish politician who served as the Secretary of State for the Grand Duchy of Finland between 1811 and 1841. One of the highest officials in the Grand Duchy, he played a significant part in establishing the autonomous role of Finland at the Diet of Porvoo in 1809.

== Biography ==
Born in Paimio, Rehbinder was given the title count in 1826, and in 1834 he was given the title Privy Counsellor. He was also awarded with the second highest Russian honor and given an honorary doctorship in philosophy at the University of Helsinki in 1840, at the 200 year jubilee of the University (originally Royal Academy of Turku). He also owned the Viksberg castle in Paimio. He died in Saint Petersburg.

== Legacy ==
Three streets in Helsinki have been named after him: Stora Robertsgatan (Iso Roobertinkatu) in Punavuori, Lilla Robertsgatan (Pieni Roobertinkatu) in Kaartinkaupunki and Rehbindersvägen (Rehbinderintie) in Eira. Furthermore, the current southern part of the Mannerheimintie street was until 1942 named after him (Heikinkatu or Henriksgatan in Swedish). He was portrayed on a stamp in Finland in 1936.
