= Yahya Hendi =

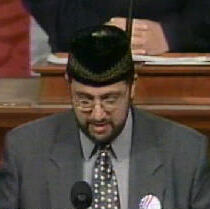
Imam Hendi in 2001

Imam Yahya Hendi is the Muslim chaplain at Georgetown University; the former Imam of the Islamic Society of Frederick based in Frederick, Maryland; and the former Muslim chaplain at the National Naval Medical Center in Bethesda until his retirement from the United States Navy. He was the United States' first full-time Muslim chaplain based at a university. Hendi currently oversees Georgetown’s masjid, the first full-scale mosque on a college campus in the United States.

Hendi was born in Nablus, Palestine and studied Islamic theology in Jordan. He also studied Christianity, Judaism, and Hebrew in the United States for his doctorate. He holds that Islam is pliable, Muslims have always adapted to their adopted countries and incorporated local customs while maintaining the core practice of the Five Pillars of Islam.

In May 2002, Hartford Seminary chose Imam Hendi to receive its annual “James Gettemy Significant Ministry Award” for his dedication to his Ministry and for his work to promote peace building between members of different faiths. In February 2009, the Imam was honored by the Baltimore field office of the FBI for fighting terrorism, drugs and violence in America.
