= Plato E. Shaw =

American historian

Plato Ernest Oliver Shaw (April 2, 1883 — August 5, 1947) was an American historian and seminary professor born in Athens, Greece. A graduate of Yale Divinity School, Columbia University, Union Theological Seminary, the University of Edinburgh, and Oxford University, he was professor at Hartford Theological Seminary from 1924 to 1941. His major research focus was relations between Anglicans and Orthodox Christians. Shaw also wrote on the Catholic Apostolic Church.

He was a member of the American Historical Association, the American Library Association, the American Society of Church History, the Oxford Union, and a fellow of the Royal Historical Society (1921). He renounced his status as a British subject to become an American citizen on March 4, 1929. Shaw was an ordained Methodist pastor. He married Elizabeth Rosemary Vincent in New York City on August 8, 1930.

Shaw died in New York, and is buried at Stout-Manners Cemetery in Ringoes, New Jersey.

== Bibliography ==
- Essay on the Patriarch Gennadios II. and the Greek Church at the Conquest (1919)
- The Early Tractarians and the Eastern Church (1930)
- American Contacts with the Eastern Churches, 1820-1870 (1937)
- The Catholic Apostolic Church, Sometimes Called Irvingite: A Historical Study (1946)
- The Iconoclastic Conflict: Its Causes and Significance (undated)
