= Aflatun Amashov =

Azerbaijani politician

Aflatun Amashov Member of the National Assembly of Azerbaijan
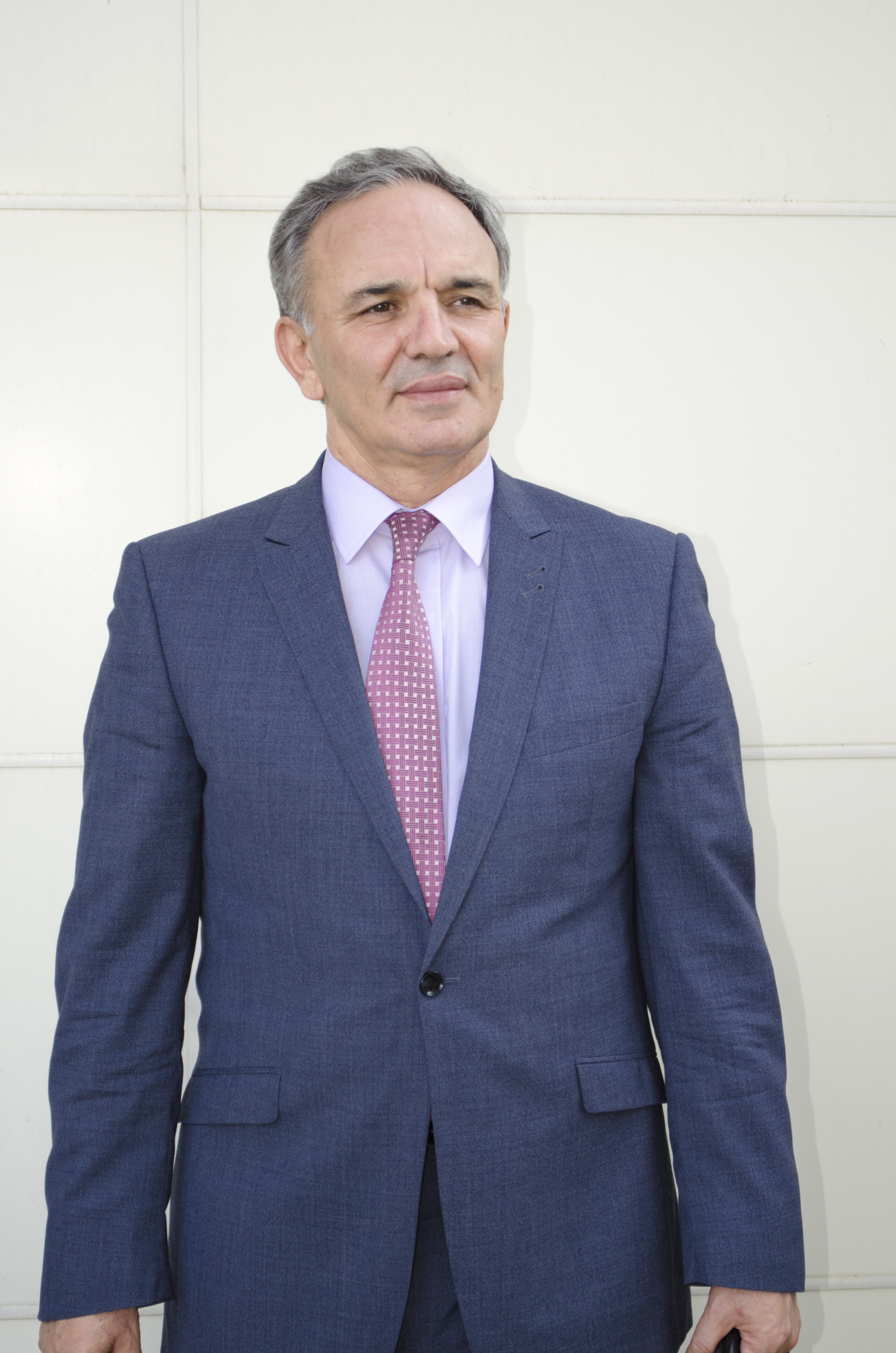

Personal details
- Born: 26 April 1957 (age 69) Fakhrali, Bolnisi, Georgia
- Party: Independent
- Education: Baku State University, Moscow State University
- Occupation: Journalism
- Profession: Faculty of journalism

Aflatun Amashov is an Azerbaijani journalist and publicist, and Member of the National Assembly. He also is chair of the Press Council of Azerbaijan, former Chairman of the "RUH" Committee for the Protection of the Rights of Journalists of Azerbaijan, and Honorary Cultural Worker.

== Biography ==
Amashov was born on 26 April 1957 in the village of Fakhrali (Talaveri), Bolnisi, Georgia.

== Education ==
- In 1974, he graduated from Fakhrali secondary school.
- In 1976–78, he served in the Armed Forces of the USSR.
- In 1979, he entered the philological faculty of Baku State University.
- In 1984, he graduated from the Moscow State University, Faculty of Journalism.

== Journalism and socio-political activities ==
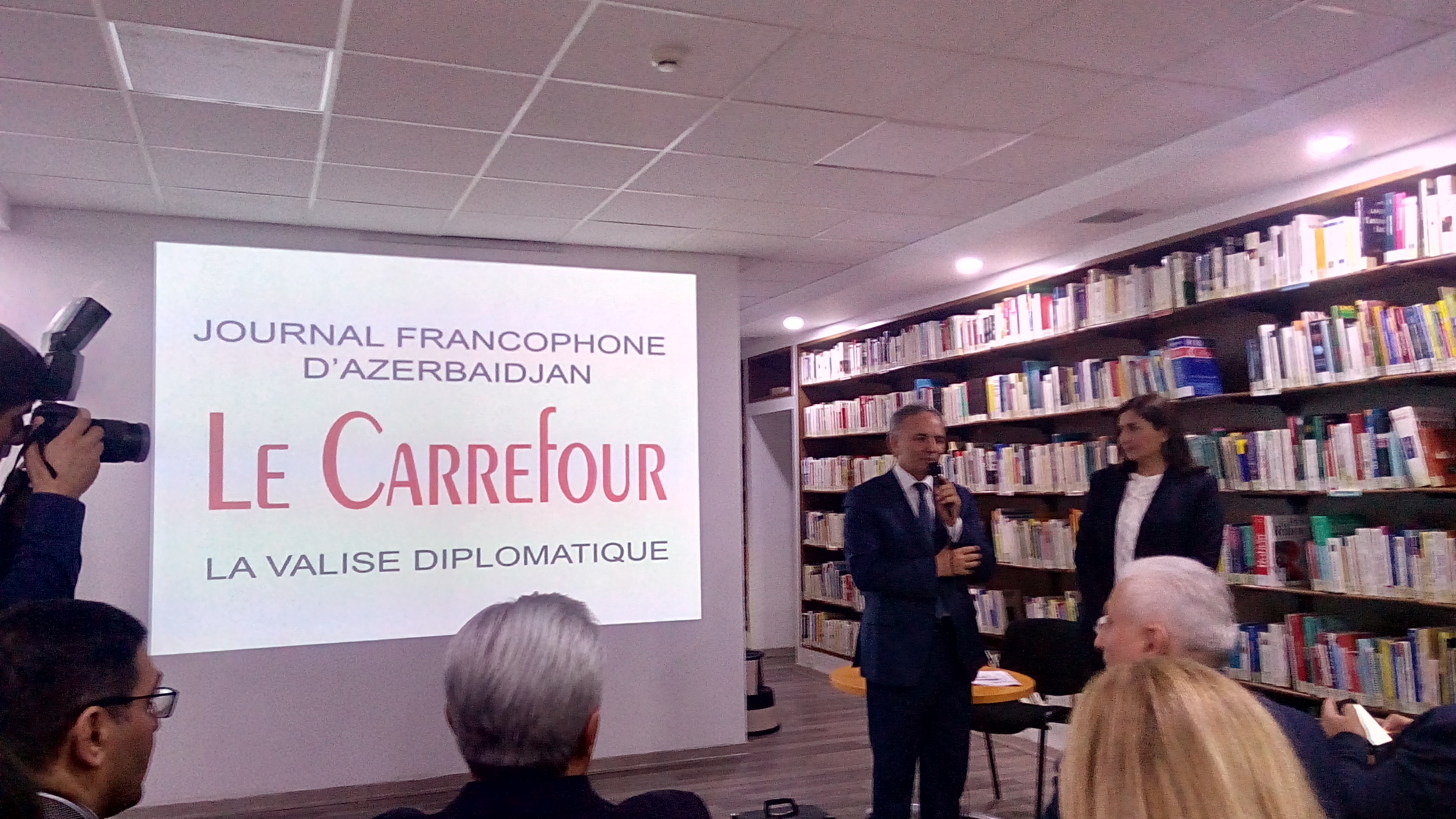
At the promotion of "Le Carrefour" newspaper held at the French Institute in Azerbaijan, 5 April 2017

- In 1985–94, he worked as a correspondent, chief of department, editor, editor-in-chief and the first deputy general director of "AzerTAC" State News Agency.
- In 1995, he was one of the founders of the "Yeni Nəsil" Union.
- In 1995–98, he served as deputy chairman of this organization.
- In 1998, he was elected the chairman of the Defense Committee of Azerbaijani Journalists called "RUH".
- In 2003, he was elected Chairman of the Press Council of Azerbaijan at the I Congress of Azerbaijani journalists.
- At the 2005 and 2008 congresses, this task was again entrusted to him.

He is the author of many books and a number of textbooks in the field of journalism. He is a member of the Board of the World Press Councils and the Association of European Press Councils. He was appointed the member of the supervisory board of the State Fund for Support of Mass Media Development under the President of the Republic of Azerbaijan by the Decree of the President of the Republic of Azerbaijan dated 22 May 2009.

== Awards ==
- 3rd Grade "For Service to Motherland" – 15 July 2015
- Order of Glory – 25 April 2017
