= Chester David Hartranft =

American theologian (1839–1914)

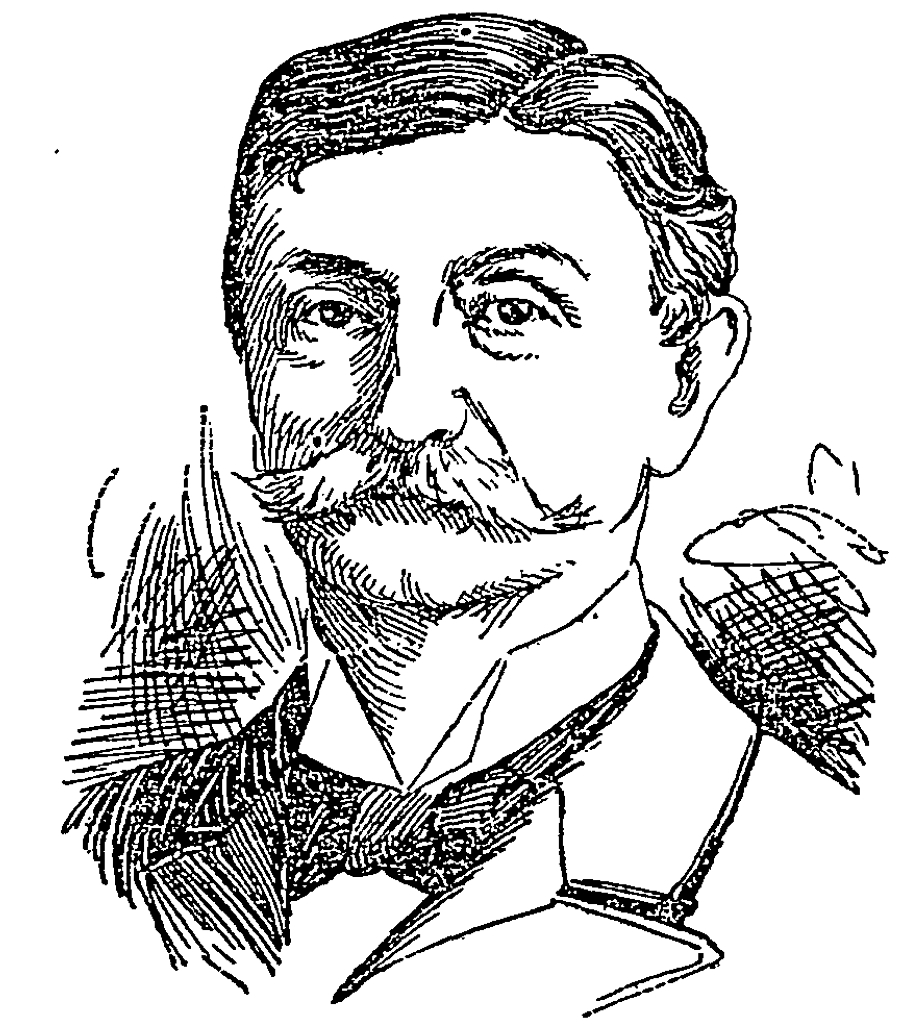
A sketch of Hartranft

Chester David Hartranft (15 October 1839 in Frederick Township, Montgomery County, Pennsylvania – 30 December 1914 in Germany) was a United States educator.

== Biography ==
He was educated at the University of Pennsylvania in 1861 and at the New Brunswick Theological Seminary in 1864; was pastor of the Dutch Reformed church at South Bushwick, New York, in 1864–1866, and of that in New Brunswick, New Jersey, in 1866–1878. He was, at one time, president of the Conservatory of Music at New Brunswick.

In 1879 he was appointed professor of ecclesiastical history at the Hartford Theological Seminary. In 1888, he was elected its president, and held the chair of Biblical theology in the years 1892–1897 and of ecclesiastical dogmatics from 1897 to 1903. He resigned the presidency in 1903 to engage in literary work in Germany. He died in Wolfenbüttel, where he was buried.
