= Platon Chirnoagă =

Romanian general

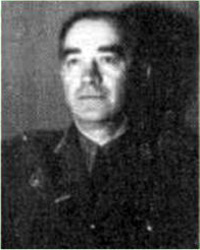
Platon Chirnoagă

Platon Chirnoagă (October 24, 1894 – March 29, 1974) was a Romanian brigadier-general during World War II.

Chirnoagă was born in 1894 in Poduri, Bacău County, one of eight children of Gheorghe Chirnoagă, a teacher, and his wife, Olimpia; one of his brothers, Eugen Chirnoagă, became a chemist.

He attended military school from 1913 to 1915, graduating with the rank of second lieutenant. He then fought in World War I in Transylvania and Moldavia, and was promoted to lieutenant in 1917. In 1919 he fought in the Hungarian–Romanian War, advancing to the rank of captain. From 1923 to 1925 he attended the Higher War School; he was promoted to major (1926), lieutenant colonel (May 1934), and then colonel (February 1939).

In 1941, Chirnoagă was Chief Operation 3rd Army and then Vice Chief of Staff 3rd Army. He became Commanding Officer 7th Artillery Regiment and subsequently Vice Chief of Staff 3rd Army in 1942. In January 1944, he was promoted to brigadier general. Later that year, he was Commanding Officer 4th Artillery Brigade, General Officer Commanding 4th Division, and finally a German prisoner. In 1945, Chirnoagă was declared Minister of Defence in a puppet government in exile established by Nazi Germany.

On 8 May 1945 he was arrested and interned at the Glasenbach camp, an Allied POW camp near Salzburg where members of Nazi organizations and war criminals were held. On March 21, 1946, he was sentenced to death in absentia by the Bucharest People's Tribunal. He was freed in April 1947, after which he lived in Austria. A CIA report from May 1949 identified Chirnoagă as a member of the Iron Guard, who had close contacts with Horia Sima. His wife, Lucia (born 1907) stayed in Bucharest, and as of 1953, was under investigation by the Securitate. He later moved to France, and published his war memoirs in 1965. After 1968 he went to Stuttgart, where he died in 1974.
