= Minister–Secretary of State for Finland =

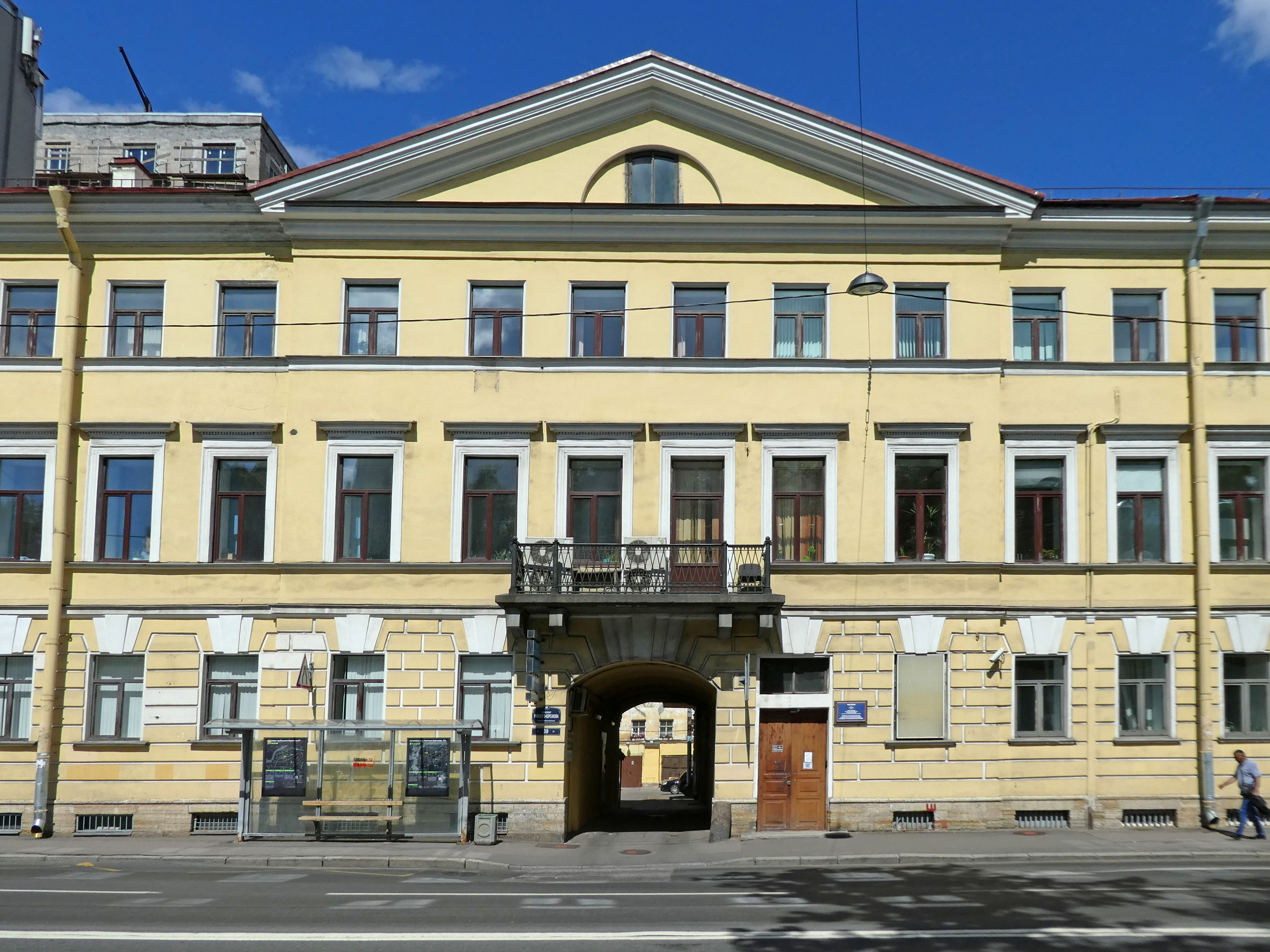
The Office of the Finnish Minister-Secretary of State in Saint Petersburg.

The Minister–Secretary of State for Finland (in Finnish ministerivaltiosihteeri; in Swedish ministerstatssekreterare) represented interests of the Grand Duchy of Finland in the Imperial Court in Saint Petersburg from 1809 to 1917. Before 1834 the title was secretary of state. The Russian Tsar was represented in Helsinki by the Governor General.

The first secretary of state was Alexander I's Russian advisor Mikhail Speransky from 1809 to 1811.

This secretary of state was an official who, and whose office (there were deputy and assistants) had the monopoly to present Finnish affairs to the Emperor. All acts of the emperor concerning the grand duchy, were to be countersigned by this state secretary, or deputized officials. When the Finnish autonomy was establishing, other Finnish-related officials generally supported, and helped to build this monopoly (to mention, Governor-General Alexander Sergeyevich Menshikov was a supporter of this particularism and although he resided in St Petersburg and was in close contact with the emperor as simultaneous Russian Minister of Navy, he consistently had Finnish affairs to go through the Minister State Secretary). The tradition, endorsed by conservative emperors such as Nicholas I, created a strong precedent. Russian general government was effectively kept out of Finnish affairs, this minister having the benefit of the channel, and many possibilities to stall Russian ministers. Only in last two decades of the grand duchy, those periods of russification, the system was attempted to be broken in some regards, but it created counteroffensives based on illegality arguments. Vyacheslav von Plehve's appointment in 1900 was criticized as illegal, because he was not a Finnish citizen. Afterwards, russified Finnish citizens were occasionally used in this office and as members of the senate in Helsinki.

== State Secretary ==
State Secretary	In Office
count Mikhail Speransky	1809–1811
baron, later count Robert Henrik Rehbinder	1811–1834

== Minister–Secretary of State ==
Minister–Secretary of State	In Office
baron Robert Henrik Rehbinder	1834–1841
count Alexander Armfelt	1842–1876
baron Emil Stjernvall-Walleen	1876–1881
baron Theodor Bruun	1881–1888
Johann Casimir Ehrnrooth	1888–1891
Woldemar von Daehn	1891–1898
Victor Procopé (acting)	1898–1899
Vyacheslav von Plehve	1900–1904
Edvard Oerstroem (Andreievich) (acting)	1904–1905
Constantin Linder	1905
Edvard Oerstroem (Andreievich) (acting)	1905–1906
August Langhoff (later baron)	1906–1913
Vladimir Ivanovich Markov	1913–1917

== Finland's representative ==
Representative	In Office
Fyodor Rodichev	1917

== Minister–Secretary of State ==
Minister–Secretary of State	In Office
Carl Enckell	1917
