= Plato Fludd =

American politician

Plato C. Fludd (fl. 1865–1875) was a judge, public official, and politician in South Carolina.

He had lived in Charleston and had been enslaved, lived in Florence, South Carolina and was one of its first elected politicians. In 1865, Fludd was one of a group who organized a mass meeting to discuss representation of Black citizens at the South Carolina state convention. On Florence's incorporation in 1870, Fludd served as the town's postmaster. He also served in the state legislature. He represented Darlington County, South Carolina. He served as a judge and county treasurer. Governor Daniel H. Chamberlain dismissed him as a judge in 1875.

Governor Robert K. Scott appointed him as an election official in 1870. In 1875 the legislature passed an act allowing him to construct gates across a public lane running past his property.

== See also ==
- African American officeholders from the end of the Civil War until before 1900
