= Platon Udovenko =

Ukrainian and Russian prelate of the Russian Orthodox Church (1940–2026)

Schemetropolitan Platon Udovenko
- Metropolitan
- Platon Udovenko in 2019
- Native name: Платон (ecclesiastical); Владимир Петрович Удовенко (secular)
- Church: Russian Orthodox Church
- Archdiocese: Eparchy of Feodosia and Kerch
- Diocese: Sverdlovsk and Kurgan; Yaroslavl and Rostov; Argentina and South America

Orders
- Ordination: 16 December 1973 (as bishop) by Patriarch Pimen

Personal details
- Born: Vladimir Petrovich Udovenko; 17 November 1940 Uspenka, Voroshilovgrad Oblast, Ukrainian SSR, Soviet Union
- Died: 6 November 2026 (aged 85) Moscow, Russia
- Denomination: Russian Orthodox
- Residence: Republic of Crimea (in retirement)
- Education: Kiev Theological Seminary; Odessa Theological Seminary; Leningrad Theological Academy; Moscow Theological Academy

Schemetropolitan Platon (Russian: Схимитрополит Платон), secular name Vladimir Petrovich Udovenko (Note: In this name that follows East Slavic naming customs, the patronymic is Petrovich and the family name is Udovenko.) (Russian: Владимир Петрович Удовенко; 17 November 1940 – 6 November 2026), was a bishop of the Russian Orthodox Church who served as the Metropolitan of Feodosia and Kerch (2012–2024). He also served as a People's Deputy of the RSFSR and the Russian Federation (1990–1993) and was a member of the Supreme Soviet of the RSFSR and the Russian Federation (1991–1992).

His name day is 18 November (1 December), the feast day of the Venerable Platon of Ancyra.

== Biography ==
=== Before the Episcopate ===
Platon was born in Ukraine, the fourth child in a family that lost its father early on. After finishing school in 1957, he entered the Dormition Monastery in Odessa as a novice, where he spent a year working in the candle workshop.

In 1958, he began his studies at the Kiev Theological Seminary; after its closure in 1960, he continued his education at the Odessa Theological Seminary.

From 1961 to 1964, he served in the Soviet Army, after which he resumed his seminary studies.

In 1965, Platon graduated from the seminary and enrolled at the Leningrad Theological Academy, where he defended a thesis in theology titled "A Historical Overview of the Relations Between the Russian and Roman Catholic Churches."

He worked as an aide in the Department for External Church Relations of the Moscow Patriarchate while simultaneously pursuing postgraduate studies at the Moscow Theological Academy.

In 1971, he was tonsured a monk by Metropolitan Nikodim (Rotov), Chairman of the Department for External Church Relations of the Moscow Patriarchate (DECR). That same year, he was ordained a hierodeacon and a hieromonk. In 1972, he was elevated to the rank of archimandrite by Metropolitan Nikodim and sent to Argentina.

=== Episcopate ===
On 16 December 1973, Platon was ordained Bishop of Argentina and South America (succeeding Bishop Maxim [Krokha]); the ordination was led by Patriarch Pimen.

On 6 October 1977, he was elevated to the rank of Archbishop and appointed Exarch of Central and South America (having succeeded Archbishop Nikodim Rusnak in the administration of the Exarchate).

In 1980, Platon took charge of the Sverdlovsk and Kurgan diocese, replacing the ailing Archbishop Kliment [Perestyuk], while also assuming temporary administration of the Chelyabinsk diocese. In 1983, he succeeded in opening a parish in Kamyshlov, the first such opening in the diocese in thirty years. Furthermore, from 1981 to 1986, he served as deputy chairman of the DECR.

In 1984, after the retirement of Metropolitan Ioann (Vendland), he assumed the cathedra of the Yaroslavl and Rostov Diocese. During his tenure, eight churches in the city of Yaroslavl and more than fifty throughout the region were returned to the Church. He oversaw the restoration of the Tolga and Spaso-Yakovlevsky monasteries and secured the recovery of the relics of several saints and historical figures: the princes Fyodor Rostislavich Cherny ("the Black"), David Fyodorovich, Konstantin Fyodorovich Ulemets, Vasily Vsevolodovich, and Konstantin Vsevolodovich; the hierarchs Dimitry of Rostov, Innokenty of Irkutsk, and Ignatius Brianchaninov; and the Venerable Avraamy (Abraham) of Rostov.

On 18 March 1990, Platon was elected a People's Deputy of the RSFSR from the Kirovsky territorial electoral district No. 773 (Yaroslavl). From 2 November 1991, to 14 December 1992, he served as a member of the Supreme Soviet of the RSFSR (later the Russian Federation). He worked on the Supreme Soviet’s committee on freedom of conscience and participated in drafting the law "On Freedom of Religious Beliefs." According to contemporary sociologists, this law opened the way for the formation of numerous "new religious movements."

In June 1990, he participated in the Local Council of the Russian Orthodox Church; he proposed reducing the number of votes required for a candidate – nominated by the Local Council – to be included in the final list of candidates for the office of Patriarch, but the proposal was not adopted. The Archbishop himself put forward the candidacy of Metropolitan Pitirim (Nechaev) of Volokolamsk. Furthermore, Archbishop Platon took part in various discussions, for instance, by suggesting that an address be sent to the parishioners of the Russian Orthodox Church Outside of Russia (ROCOR).

From 1 November 1993, Platon once again administered the Diocese of Argentina and South America.

In 2000, he participated in the Bishops' Council of the Russian Orthodox Church, where he spoke out against limiting the authority of the Local Council.

On 29 February 2004, Platon was elevated to the rank of metropolitan by Patriarch Alexy II.

From 2010 to 26 July 2012, he served as the second Vice-Chairman of the Assembly of Orthodox Bishops of South America.

On 26 July 2012, he was relieved of his duties as head of the Argentine-South American Diocese and transferred to the Ukrainian Orthodox Church (Moscow Patriarchate), with his subsequent assignment to a see to be determined by the Holy Synod of the latter. Before his final departure from the South American diocese, Metropolitan Platon paid a farewell visit to all the parishes in his diocese.

On 20 December 2012, Platon was appointed to head the newly established Eparchy of Feodosia and Kerch.

On 7 June 2022, at a meeting of the Holy Synod of the Russian Orthodox Church, the Feodosia Diocese was placed under the direct canonical and administrative jurisdiction of the Patriarch of Moscow and All Rus' and the Holy Synod of the Russian Orthodox Church.

On 25 July 2024, by a decision of the Holy Synod of the Russian Orthodox Church, Platon was relieved of his duties as head of the Feodosia Diocese, with an expression of gratitude for his many years of archpastoral labour, and granted retirement; the Republic of Crimea was designated as his place of residence during retirement, with his financial support to be provided by the Feodosia Diocese.

On 23 July 2026, with the blessing of His Holiness Patriarch Kirill of Moscow and All Rus', he was tonsured into the Great Schema, retaining his name but now in honour of a different saint: the Martyr Platon of Ancyra.

=== Death ===
Platon died on 6 November 2026, at the age of 85.

== Awards ==
=== Secular awards ===
==== Awards from the Russian Federation ====
- Order of Friendship (11 August 2000) – for a significant contribution to the development of spiritual and cultural ties between the international community and Russia
- Honorary Citizen of Kerch (2021)

=== Church awards ===
==== Awards from the Greek Orthodox Patriarchate of Jerusalem ====
- Order of the Holy Church of Jerusalem (1982)

==== Awards from the Russian Orthodox Church ====
- 1977 – Order of Saint Vladimir, Equal-to-the-Apostles, Grand Prince, 2nd Class
- 1980 – Order of Saint Sergius of Radonezh, 2nd Class
- 1996 – commemorative panagia
- 1997 – Order of the Holy Right-Believing Prince Daniel of Moscow, 2nd Class
- 1999 – Medal of Saint Macarius of Unzha
- 2000 – Jubilee Patriarchal Certificate for the 2000th Anniversary of the Nativity of Christ
- 2000 – Order of Saint Sergius of Radonezh, 1st Class
- 2003 – Order of Saint Innocent, Metropolitan of Moscow and Kolomna, 2nd Class
- 2006 – commemorative panagia
- 2010 – Order of Saint Seraphim of Sarov, 2nd Class
- 2010 – Patriarchal medal in honour of the 30th anniversary of the founding of the "Sofrino" artistic-production enterprise
- 2010 – Medal of the Pious Prince Yaroslav the Wise
- 2012 – Medal "In Commemoration of the 200th Anniversary of the Victory in the Patriotic War of 1812"
- 2012 – Medal of the Holy Great Martyr Catherine
- 2013 – jubilee panagia
- 2013 – Honorary Badge "1025th Anniversary of the Baptism of Kievan Rus'"
- 2015 – Order of St. Seraphim of Sarov, 1st Class
- 2018 – Order of St. Innocent of Moscow, 1st Class
- 2020 – Order of the Right-Believing Prince Daniel of Moscow, 1st Class
- 2023 – Order of St. Alexius of Moscow, 1st Class
- 2024 – In recognition of his diligent archpastoral labours and in connection with the 50th anniversary of his episcopal consecration, His Holiness the Patriarch bestowed the Order of Saint Alexius, Metropolitan of Kyiv, Moscow and All Rus' (1st Class), an award from the Russian Orthodox Church.

==== Awards from the Polish Orthodox Church ====
- 1985 – Order of Saint Mary Magdalene

== Sanctions ==
On 24 January 2023, against the backdrop of the Russian invasion of Ukraine, Platon was placed on Ukraine's sanction list, which entailed the freezing of his assets, restrictions on commercial transactions, a ban on the outflow of capital from the country, and the revocation of any Ukrainian state awards.
