= Vladimir Markov (politician) =

Finnish politician and general (1859–1919)

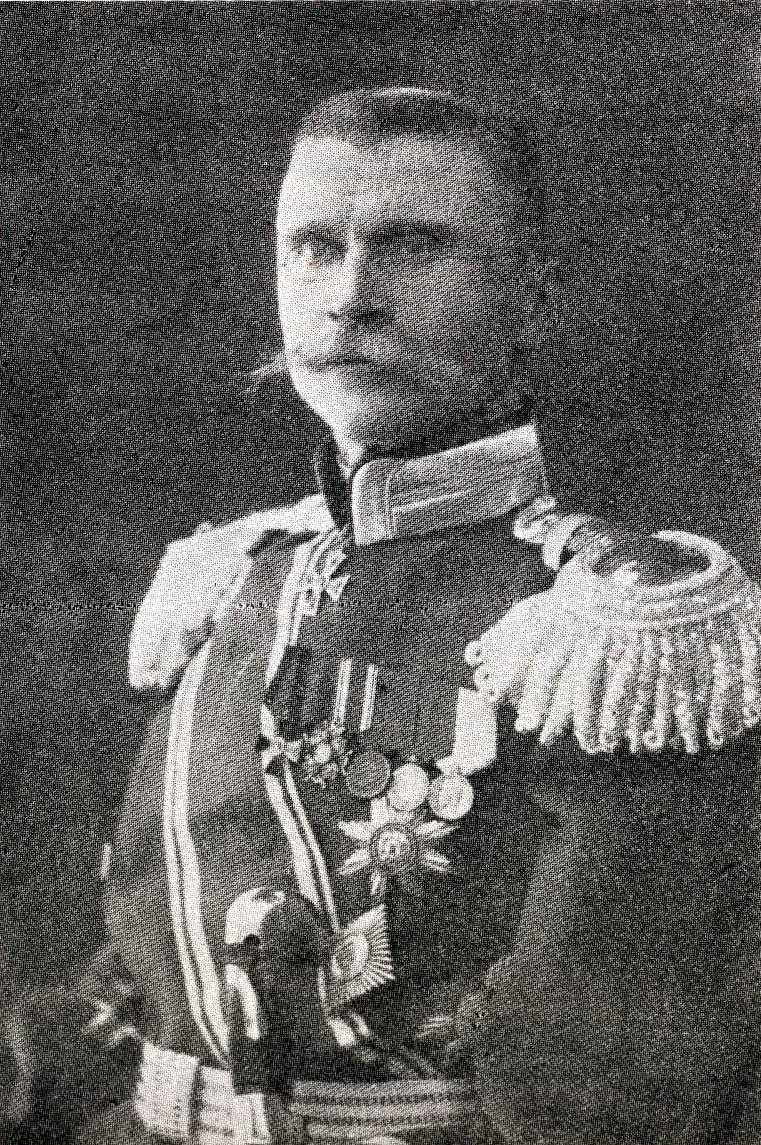
Vladimir Ivanovitch

Vladimir Ivanovitch Markoff (Markov) (26 July 1859 Hamina – August 1919 Saint Petersburg) was a Finnish Lieutenant General who was also the vice-chairman of the economic division (Prime minister) of the Senate of Finland from 1909 to 1913 and the Finnish Minister Secretary of State in Saint Petersburg from 1913 to 1917. Appointing him was part of the Russification of Finland.

== Biography ==
His parents were the Vyborg merchant Ivan Markov and Elisabet Markov. In 1887 he married Vera Vasiljevna Popova, daughter of the Saint Petersburg merchant Vasili Popov.

Markov graduated from Hamina Cadet School in 1881. He served the Imperial Russian Army in Lithuania, the Moscow Military District, and Rostov. From 1892 he served in the general headquarters in Saint Petersburg. From 1903 to 1909 Markov was head of the mobilisation department.

In early 1909 he was made chief of staff of 17th corps. In June 1906 he was appointed military governor of Transbaikal region and chief of Transbaikal Cossack Host.

Markov was vice-chairman of the Senate of Finland from 1909 to 1913, and the last Finnish Minister Secretary of State in Saint Petersburg from 1913 to 1917.

During the February Revolution, Markov was relieved of his duties and placed under house arrest in St. Petersburg. He was imprisoned by the Bolsheviks after the October Revolution and died in prison in August 1919.
