= Platon Agrikolyansky =

Eastern Orthodox priest

- Platon (Agrikolyansky) (1772–1854; lay name: Pyotr Ivanovich Agrikolyansky) was archimandrite of the Russian Orthodox Church, spiritual writer, Orthodox missionary and ethnographer in the lands of "samoyeds".
