= Ardeoani =

- Commune
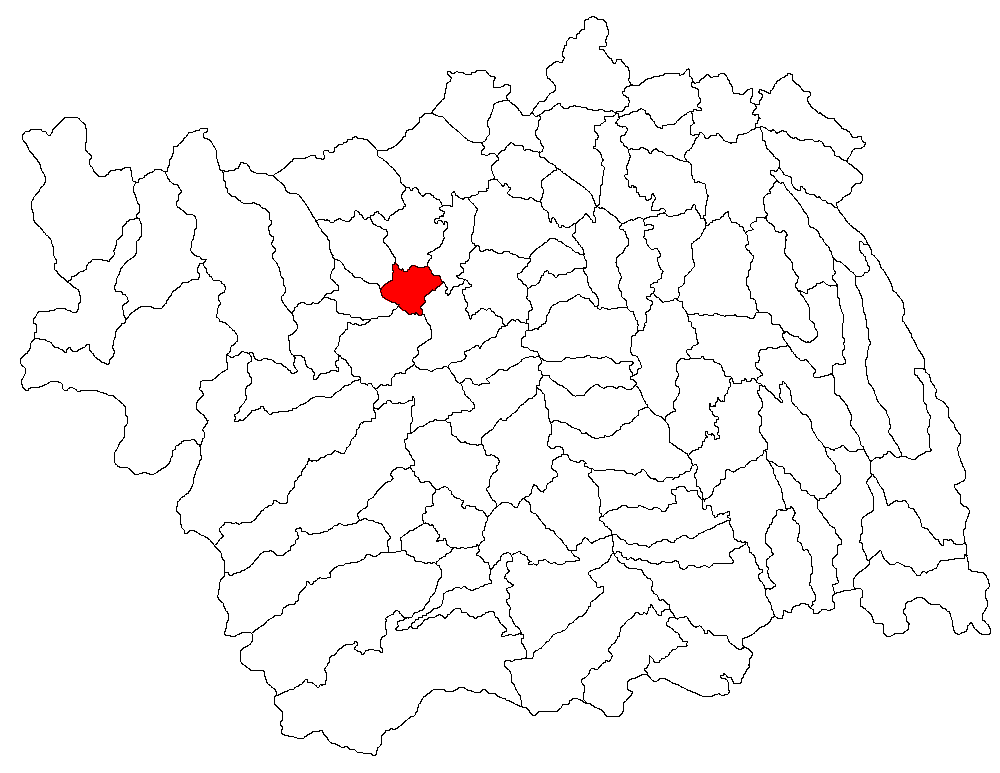
- Location in Bacău County

- Location in Romania
- Coordinates: 46°32′N 26°36′E
- Country: Romania
- County: Bacău

Government
  - Mayor (2024–2028): Victor Diaconu (AUR)
- Area: 27.51 km^{2} (10.62 sq mi)
- Elevation: 327 m (1,073 ft)
- Population (2021-12-01): 2,093
  - Density: 76.08/km^{2} (197.0/sq mi)
- Time zone: UTC+02:00 (EET)
  - Summer (DST): UTC+03:00 (EEST)
- Postal code: 607015
- Area code: +(40) 234
- Vehicle reg.: BC
- Website: comunaardeoani.ro

Ardeoani is a commune in Bacău County, Western Moldavia, Romania. It is composed of two villages, Ardeoani and Leontinești.

Historical population
Year	Pop.	±%
2002	2,563	—
2011	2,182	−14.9%
2021	2,093	−4.1%
Source: Census data
