= Zemeș =

- Commune
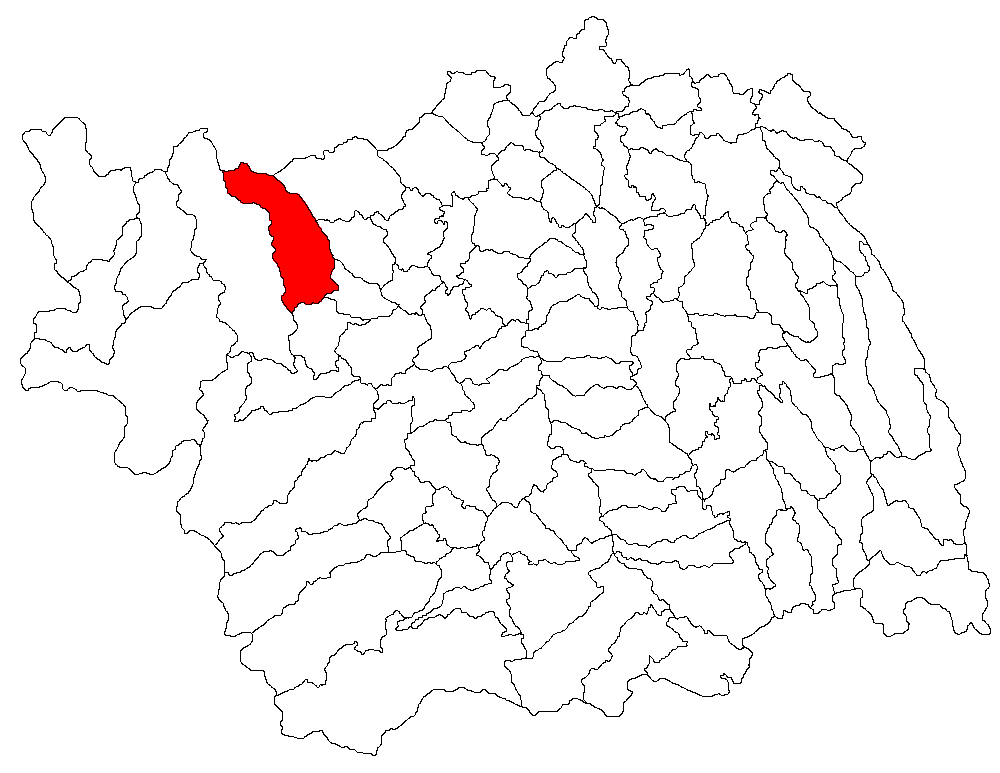
- Location in Bacău County

- Location in Romania
- Coordinates: 46°35′N 26°25′E
- Country: Romania
- County: Bacău

Government
  - Mayor (2020–2024): Răzvan Tudosă (PNL)
- Area: 106.86 km^{2} (41.26 sq mi)
- Elevation: 521 m (1,709 ft)
- Population (2021-12-01): 4,368
  - Density: 41/km^{2} (110/sq mi)
- Time zone: EET/EEST (UTC+2/+3)
- Postal code: 607690
- Area code: +(40) 234
- Vehicle reg.: BC
- Website: www.zemes.ro

Zemeș is a commune in Bacău County, Western Moldavia, Romania. It is composed of two villages, Bolătău and Zemeș.

Historical population
Year	Pop.	±%
2002	5,248	—
2011	4,368	−16.8%
2021	4,368	+0.0%
Source: Census data
