= Măgirești =

- Commune
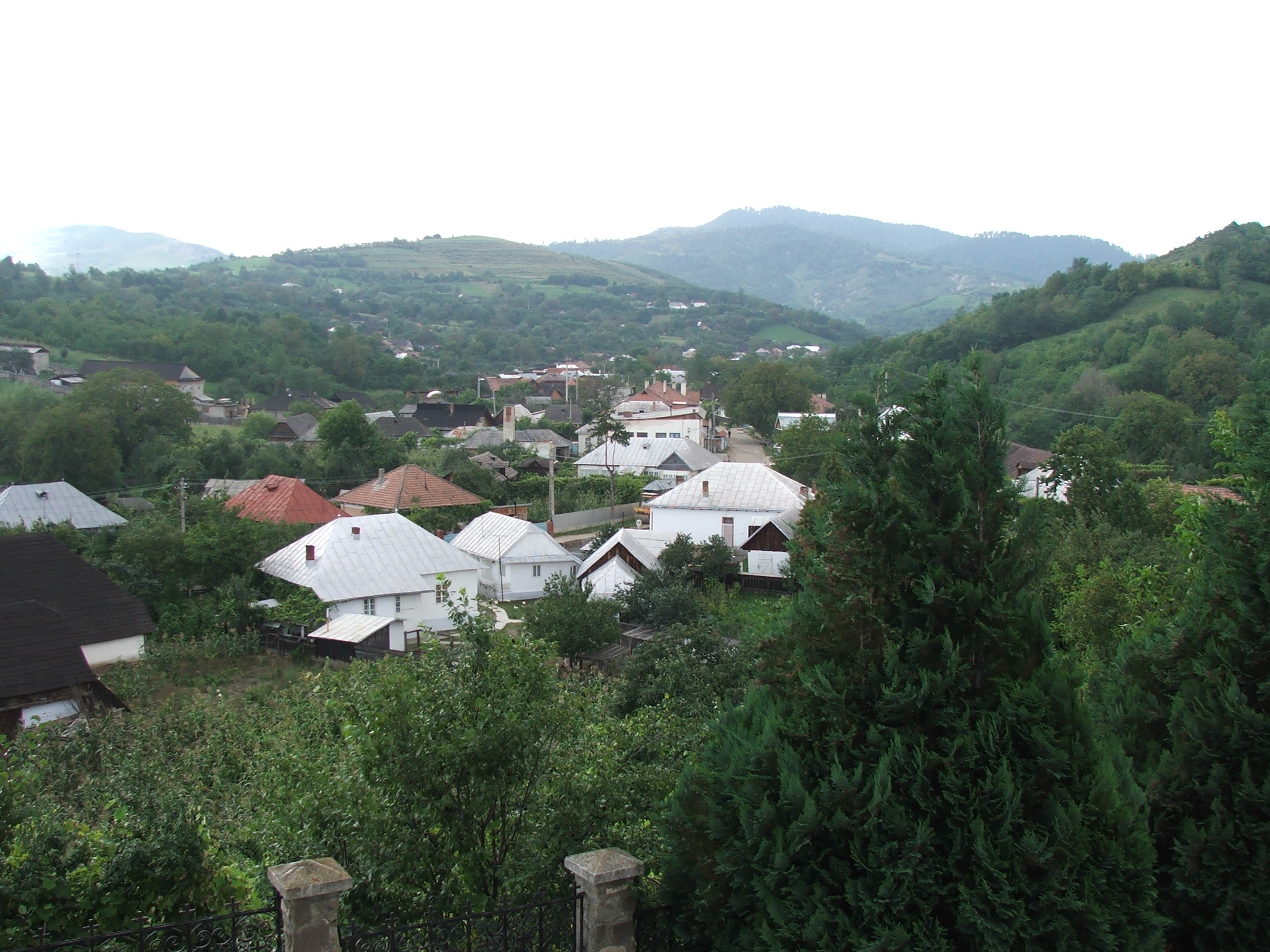
- Măgirești village

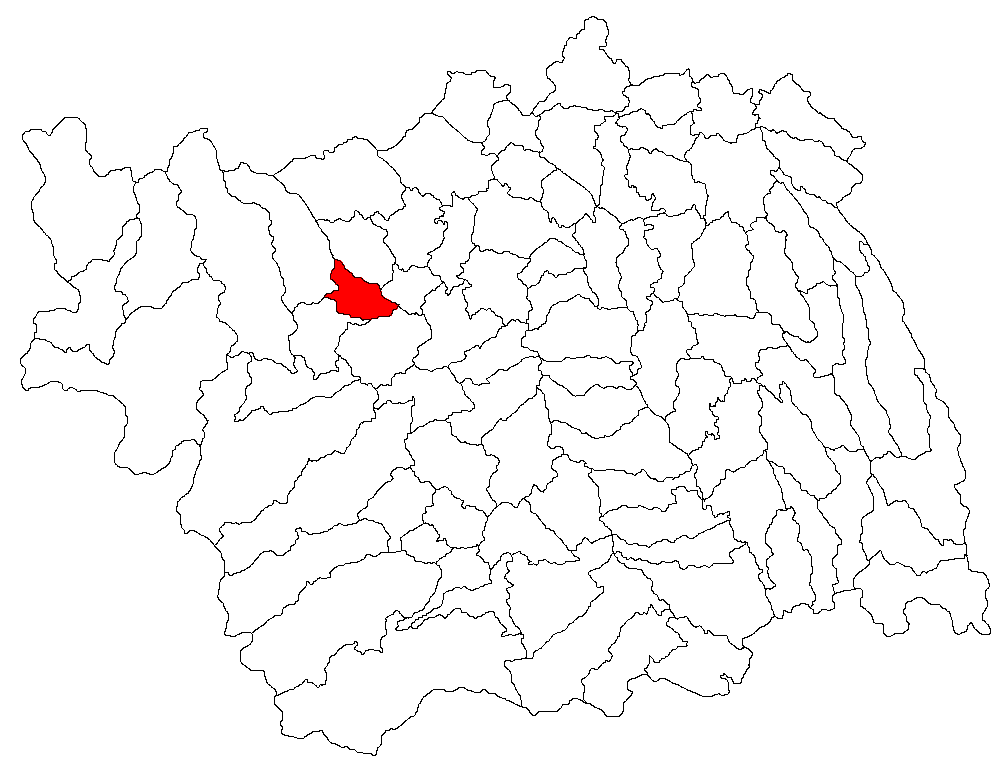
- Location in Bacău County

- Location in Romania
- Coordinates: 46°31′N 26°33′E
- Country: Romania
- County: Bacău

Government
  - Mayor (2024–2028): Ionică Câdă (PNL)
- Area: 33.17 km^{2} (12.81 sq mi)
- Elevation: 433 m (1,421 ft)
- Population (2021-12-01): 3,552
  - Density: 107.1/km^{2} (277.3/sq mi)
- Time zone: UTC+02:00 (EET)
  - Summer (DST): UTC+03:00 (EEST)
- Postal code: 607300
- Area code: +(40) 0234
- Vehicle reg.: BC
- Website: magiresti.ro

Măgirești is a commune in Bacău County, Western Moldavia, Romania. It is composed of five villages: Măgirești, Prăjești, Stănești, Șesuri, and Valea Arinilor.
