= Berheci =

- Location within Romania

Location
- Country: Romania
- Counties: Bacău, Vrancea, Galați

Physical characteristics
- Source: Zarea Obârșiei Hill
  - coordinates: 46°37′56″N 27°10′12″E
  - elevation: 316 m (1,037 ft)
- Mouth: Bârlad
  - location: Poșta
  - coordinates: 45.9802°N 27.4589°E
  - elevation: 42 m (138 ft)
- Length: 92 km (57 mi)
- Basin size: 1,021 km^{2} (394 sq mi)

Basin features
- Progression: Bârlad→ Siret→ Danube→ Black Sea
- Tributaries
  - left: Zeletin

The Berheci is a right tributary of the river Bârlad in Romania. It discharges into the Bârlad in Poșta. Its length is 92 km (57 mi) and its basin size is 1,021 km^{2} (394 sq mi).

== Towns and villages ==
The following towns and villages are situated along the river Berheci, from source to mouth: Obârșia, Izvoru Berheciului, Antohești, Tarnița, Oncești, Onceștii Vechi, Tomozia, Vultureni, Bosia, Lichitișeni, Banca, Calapodești, Tăvădărești, Dealu Morii, Negulești, Lărgășeni, Rădăcinești, Șerbănești, Corbița, Ocheșești, Feldioara, Corcioveni, Brăhășești, Nărtești and Gara Berheci.

== Tributaries ==
The following rivers are tributaries to the Berheci:

- Left: Găureni, Plopeasca, Zeletin
- Right: Dunavăț, Godinești, Găiceana, Negulești, Șerboaia, Abageru, Valea Boului
