= Zeletin (Berheci) =

- Location within Romania

Location
- Country: Romania
- Counties: Bacău, Vrancea, Galați

Physical characteristics
- Source: Țâgâra Hill
  - coordinates: 46°40′19″N 27°10′55″E
  - elevation: 435 m (1,427 ft)
- Mouth: Berheci
  - location: Gohor
  - coordinates: 46°03′09″N 27°23′07″E
  - elevation: 67 m (220 ft)
- Length: 83 km (52 mi)
- Basin size: 426 km^{2} (164 sq mi)

Basin features
- Progression: Berheci→ Bârlad→ Siret→ Danube→ Black Sea

The Zeletin is a left tributary of the river Berheci in Romania. It discharges into the Berheci in Gohor. Its length is 83 km (52 mi) and its basin size is 426 km^{2} (164 sq mi).

== Towns and villages ==
The following towns and villages situated along the river Zeletin, from source to mouth, are: Țâgâra, Satu Nou, Spria, Călini, Colonești, Zăpodia, Dănăila, Magazia, Barcana, Răchitoasa, Tochilea, Oprișești, Burdusaci, Motoșeni, Răzeșu, Glăvănești, Podu Turcului, Hanța, Plăcințeni, Tănăsoaia, Galbeni, Nănești, Cosițeni, Gohor.

== Tributaries ==
The following rivers are tributaries to the river Zeletin (from source to mouth):

- Left: Diaconeasa, Capra, Diulești, Boloia, Valea Rea de Jos
- Right: Răchitoasa, Gunoaia, Sohodol, Drobotfor, Apa Neagră
