= Drobotfor =

- Location within Romania

Location
- Country: Romania
- Counties: Bacău County

Physical characteristics
- Source: Slobozia Nouă
  - coordinates: 46°33′23″N 27°16′24″E
  - elevation: 450 m (1,480 ft)
- Mouth: Zeletin
  - location: Chicerea
  - coordinates: 46°18′16″N 27°23′44″E
  - elevation: 139 m (456 ft)
- Length: 32 km (20 mi)
- Basin size: 87.6 km^{2} (33.8 sq mi)

Basin features
- Progression: Zeletin→ Berheci→ Bârlad→ Siret→ Danube→ Black Sea
- Tributaries
  - left: Pojorâta

The Drobotfor is a right tributary of the river Zeletin in Romania. It discharges into the Zeletin in Chicerea. It flows through the villages Slobozia Nouă, Slobozia, Stănișești, Balotești, Benești and Gura Crăiești. Its length is 32 km (20 mi) and its basin size is 87.6 km^{2} (33.8 sq mi).
