= Movilița =

Moviliţa may refer to several places in Romania:

- Movilița, Ialomița, a commune in Ialomița County
- Movilița, Vrancea, a commune in Vrancea County
- Moviliţa, a village in Răchitoasa Commune, Bacău County
- Moviliţa, a village in Săgeata Commune, Buzău County
- Moviliţa, a village in Topraisar Commune, Constanța County

== See also ==
- Movila (disambiguation)
- Movilă (surname)
- Movileni (disambiguation)
