= Găiceana (river) =

- Location within Romania

Location
- Country: Romania
- Counties: Bacău County
- Villages: Arini, Găiceana

Physical characteristics
- Source
  - coordinates: 46°22′33″N 27°09′35″E
- Mouth: Berheci
  - location: Dealu Morii
  - coordinates: 46°18′00″N 27°17′42″E
  - elevation: 133 m (436 ft)
- Length: 16 km (9.9 mi)
- Basin size: 87 km^{2} (34 sq mi)

Basin features
- Progression: Berheci→ Bârlad→ Siret→ Danube→ Black Sea
- Tributaries
  - left: Ghilăvești
  - right: Arini

The Găiceana is a right tributary of the river Berheci in Romania. It discharges into the Berheci in Dealu Morii. Its length is 16 km (9.9 mi) and its basin size is 87 km^{2} (34 sq mi).
