= Pereschivul Mic =

- Location within Romania

Location
- Country: Romania
- Counties: Bacău, Vaslui
- Villages: Fundătura, Chilieni, Coroiești

Physical characteristics
- Mouth: Pereschiv
  - coordinates: 46.1737°N 27.4929°E
- Length: 21 km (13 mi)
- Basin size: 81 km^{2} (31 sq mi)

Basin features
- Progression: Pereschiv→ Bârlad→ Siret→ Danube→ Black Sea
- Tributaries
  - left: Dumbrava

The Pereschivul Mic is a left tributary of the river Pereschiv in Romania. It flows into the Pereschiv near Fichitești. Its length is 21 km (13 mi) and its basin size is 81 km^{2} (31 sq mi).
