= Dunavăț =

- Location within Romania

Location
- Country: Romania
- Counties: Bacău County
- Villages: Mărăști, Brad, Filipeni, Fruntești

Physical characteristics
- Source: Valea Mare Forest
  - coordinates: 46°36′36″N 27°09′32″E
- Mouth: Berheci
  - location: Downstream of Oncești
  - coordinates: 46°27′37″N 27°15′21″E
  - elevation: 169 m (554 ft)
- Length: 21 km (13 mi)
- Basin size: 71 km^{2} (27 sq mi)

Basin features
- Progression: Berheci→ Bârlad→ Siret→ Danube→ Black Sea
- Tributaries
  - right: Fruntești

The Dunavăț is a right tributary of the river Berheci in Romania. It discharges into the Berheci in Oncești. Its length is 21 km (13 mi) and its basin size is 71 km^{2} (27 sq mi).
