= Godinești (disambiguation) =

Godinești may refer to:

- Godinești, a commune in Gorj County, Romania
- Godinești, a village in the commune Zam, Hunedoara County, Romania
- Godineștii de Jos, a village in the commune Vultureni, Bacău County, Romania
- Godineștii de Sus, a village in the commune Vultureni, Bacău County, Romania
- Godinești, the Romanian name for the commune Hodynivka, Chernivtsi Oblast, Ukraine
- Godinești (river), a tributary of the Berheci in Bacău County, Romania
