= Răchitoasa =

- Commune
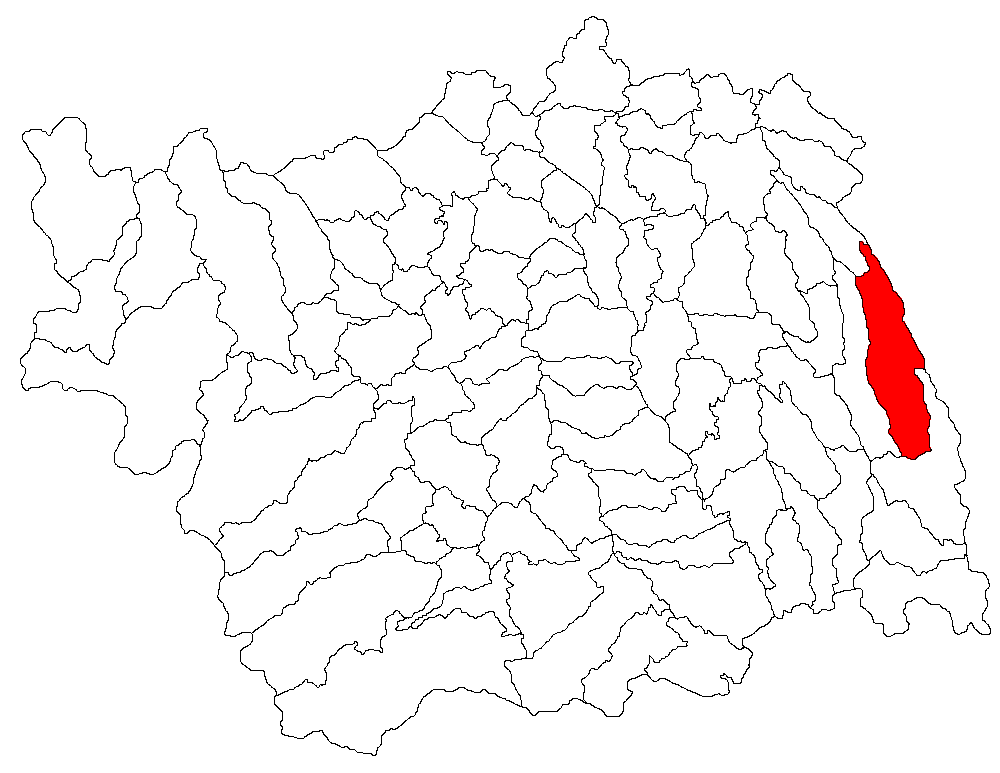
- Location in Bacău County

- Location in Romania
- Coordinates: 46°26′N 27°22′E
- Country: Romania
- County: Bacău

Government
  - Mayor (2020–2024): Valentin Moraru (PSD)
- Area: 117.23 km^{2} (45.26 sq mi)
- Elevation: 178 m (584 ft)
- Population (2021-12-01): 4,156
  - Density: 35.45/km^{2} (91.82/sq mi)
- Time zone: UTC+02:00 (EET)
  - Summer (DST): UTC+03:00 (EEST)
- Postal code: 607490
- Area code: +(40) 234
- Vehicle reg.: BC
- Website: primariarachitoasa.ro

Răchitoasa is a commune in Bacău County, Western Moldavia, Romania. It is composed of fifteen villages: Barcana, Bucșa, Buda, Burdusaci, Dănăila, Dumbrava, Farcașa, Fundătura Răchitoasa, Hăghiac, Magazia, Movilița, Oprișești, Putini, Răchitoasa, and Tochilea.

The commune is situated on the Moldavian Plateau, at an altitude of 178 m (584 ft), on the banks of the river Zeletin. It is located in the eastern part of Bacău County, 58 km (36 mi) southeast of the county seat, Bacău, on the border with Vaslui County. Răchitoasa is crossed by county road DJ241, which leads in the north to Colonești and Izvoru Berheciului and in the south to Motoșeni, Glăvănești, and Podu Turcului.

At the 2021 census, the commune had a population of 4,156; of those, 89,82% were Romanians.

The commune is home to the Răchitoasa Monastery, one of the largest in Moldavia. Built in 1697 and then used by Greek monks, the monastery was transformed during the rule of Alexandru Ioan Cuza into a leper house, and later into a nursing home. It regained its religious status in 1993, and was rehabilitated with EU funds in 2014.

== Natives ==
- Maria Tacu (1949 – 2010), poet and prose writer
- Ștefan Zeletin (1882 – 1934), philosopher, sociologist, liberal economist, and political theorist
