= Dorneni =

Dorneni may refer to several villages in Romania:

- Dorneni, a village in Plopana Commune, Bacău County
- Dorneni, a village in Vultureni Commune, Bacău County
