= Movileni =

Movileni may refer to several places in Romania:

- Movileni, Iași, a commune in Iași County
- Movileni, Olt, a commune in Olt County
- Movileni, a village in Concești Commune, Botoșani County
- Movileni, a village in Șendreni Commune, Galați County
- Movileni, a village in Tecuci Commune, Galați County
- Movileni, a village in Heleșteni Commune, Iași County
- Movileni, a village in Vadu Moldovei Commune, Suceava County
- Movileni, a village in Coroiești Commune, Vaslui County

and to:

- Movileni, a village in Cuhnești Commune, Glodeni district, Moldova

== See also ==
- Movila (disambiguation)
- Movilă (surname)
- Movilița (disambiguation)
