= Fundătura =

Fundătura may refer to several villages in Romania:

- Fundătura, a village in Motoșeni Commune, Bacău County
- Fundătura, a village in Iclod Commune, Cluj County
- Fundătura, a village in the town of Luduş, Mureș County
- Fundătura, a village in Arsura Commune, Vaslui County
- Fundătura, a village in Delești Commune, Vaslui County
- Fundătura, a village in Vlădești, Vâlcea
- Fundătura Mare and Fundătura Mică, villages in Ivănești Commune, Vaslui County
- Fundătura Răchitoasa, a village in Răchitoasa Commune, Bacău County
- Fundăturile, a village in Pătârlagele town, Buzău County

== See also ==
- Fundătura River (disambiguation)
- Fundeni (disambiguation)
- Fundoaia (disambiguation)
- Fundata
