= Ștefan Zeletin =

Romanian philosopher, sociologist, liberal economist and political theorist

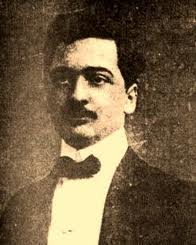
Ștefan Zeletin

Ștefan Zeletin (born Ștefan Motăș; June 19, 1882 – July 20, 1934) was a Romanian philosopher, sociologist, liberal economist and political theorist.

== Biography ==
Born in Burdusaci, Bacău County, his mother Catinca Motăș (née Chiriac) was the daughter of Ștefanache Chiriac, a local official of Greek origin from the nearby village of Ursa. Her husband, the postelnic Dumitrache Motăș, died sixteen years before Zeletin's birth. The latter's father is unknown (one possibility is the local mayor and well-off landowner Neculache Brăescu), and he remained sensitive to the fact of his illegitimate birth, adopting a pseudonym (after the Zeletin River that passes through Burdusaci) to distance himself from his mother's husband. He grew up in a peasant family of the bourgeoisie, which he would later analyze in his work.

He attended Codreanu High School in Bârlad and the theological seminary in Roman. His tertiary studies took place at the University of Iași (1906), of Berlin (1907–1908), Paris (1909–1910), Leipzig (1910), Berlin (1910–1911) and Erlangen (1911). After taking his doctorate from the latter university in 1912, on the subject of idealism in contemporary English philosophy and advised by Richard Falckenberg, he returned to Romania and taught German at Codreanu. He started publishing soon after, with Evanghelia naturii ("The Gospel of Nature") coming out at Iași in 1915, and Din țara măgarilor ("From the Country of the Donkeys") appearing in 1916. An allegorical work about a population of "donkeys" that borders the Bulgarians, it drew an angry response from Nicolae Iorga, who signed his review "someone who is not a donkey"; others praised the pamphlet for its insightful analysis of Romanian society. One scope of the work was to ridicule Romanian pretensions over Southern Dobruja, which the country had gained as a result of the Second Balkan War. He moved to the national capital Bucharest in 1920, continuing to work as a German teacher, at Mihai Viteazul High School.

His most important volume of sociology, Burghezia română ("The Romanian Bourgeoisie"), was published in 1925. Two years later, he became a philosophy professor at the University of Iași. His last book, Nirvana (1928), deals with his understanding of philosophy as correlated with poetry, with philosophy's influence on his outlook and its being a source of inspiration for him. The work revisited themes found in the earlier Evanghelia naturii. A sympathizer of the National Liberal Party, with leading member Vintilă Brătianu a backer of his theories, Zeletin nevertheless joined the People's Party. He carried on a correspondence with several prominent intellectuals, including Iorga, Vasile Bogrea, Garabet Ibrăileanu, Gheorghe I. Brătianu, Nicolae Bagdasar, and his close friend Cezar Papacostea. He became gravely ill in 1930 and died four years later. He was buried in Bucharest's Sfânta Vineri Cemetery by his brother Dimitrie Motăș, aided by Papacostea and Bagdasar. He never married and had no children. A popular theorist of neoliberalism in the 1930s and 1940s, his ideas were shunned after the onset of the Communist regime in 1947. His works again began to see publication as part of anthologies in the 1970s, when his work on social development theory was re-evaluated. Following the 1989 fall of communism, his work reappeared in proper form and his ideas reentered debates about political ideology and national identity.

== Work ==
Intellectual debates in interwar Romania were dominated by "traditionalists", who argued that the country should look to its past for its road to development; and "Europeanists", who said the industrialized and urbanized West pointed the economic and social way forward. Among the latter camp, while Eugen Lovinescu wrote about the transformative power of ideas, Zeletin focused on the importance of economics in Burghezia română. There, he argued that the 1829 Treaty of Adrianople had loosened the Danubian Principalities from the constricting influence of long Ottoman domination, producing the fundamental economic changes that gave rise to modern Romania. He pointed out how, following the 1859 Union of the Principalities, massive Western investment had led to the emergence of a bourgeois middle class composed of boyars who had turned to trade, and of a capitalist economy. Moreover, he argued that continued industrialization and adoption of European technology, guided by this class, were necessary for Romania to avoid retrenchment.

He drew on the theories of Werner Sombart, who posited that foreigners bring capitalism to countries embarking on a course of modernization, which at a later stage rebel against perceived foreign domination. Zeletin placed early-1920s Romania at this second stage, thus explaining the "nationalism of reaction" that was "xenophobic, in particular anti-Semitic", directed against the country's Jewish community. Prophetically, he suggested that Romanians would "attempt to emancipate themselves from foreign patronage, in order to live on their own strength"; he died before the worst of the country's xenophobic and antisemitic reaction had displayed itself.

He saw the liberal forms the country had adopted as being not artificial, but well-adapted to his society's current stage of development. Adopting a semi-Marxist discourse, Zeletin held that modern capitalism was a "historical necessity" both unavoidable and not subject to criticism. By contrast, he viewed traditional Romanian culture as reactionary. Among Burghezia română's admirers were Ibrăileanu, Tudor Vianu, Alexandru Claudian and Constantin Noica.

In Neoliberalismul (1927), he proposed a scientific definition of neoliberalism, enumerated its effects and identified the impediments to its gaining political currency in Romania—popular prejudice on the one hand, and on the other, doctrines such as Junimism, nationalism, Poporanism and socialism. Constantin Rădulescu-Motru, Nae Ionescu, Virgil Madgearu and Nicolae Roșu accused him of holding materialist, Marxist or socialist views.

== Bibliography ==
- Evanghelia naturii (1915)
- Din țara măgarilor. Însemnări (1916)
- Burghezia română (1925)
- Neoliberalismul (1927)
- Nirvana. Gânduri despre lume și viață (1928)
