= Dumbrava (river) =

- Location within Romania

Location
- Country: Romania
- Counties: Vaslui County
- Villages: Bărtăluș-Răzeși, Mireni, Movileni

Physical characteristics
- Mouth: Pereschivul Mic
  - location: Coroiești
  - coordinates: 46.2424°N 27.4957°E
- Length: 18 km (11 mi)
- Basin size: 42 km^{2} (16 sq mi)

Basin features
- Progression: Pereschivul Mic→ Pereschiv→ Bârlad→ Siret→ Danube→ Black Sea

The Dumbrava is a left tributary of the river Pereschivul Mic in Romania. It flows into the Pereschivul Mic in Coroiești. Its length is 18 km (11 mi) and its basin size is 42 km^{2} (16 sq mi).
