= Oprișești =

Oprişeşti may refer to several villages in Romania:

- Oprişeşti, a village in Răchitoasa Commune, Bacău County
- Oprişeşti, a village in Balșa Commune, Hunedoara County
