= Chilieni =

Chilieni may refer to several villages in Romania:

- Chilieni, Covasna, a village in the city of Sfântu Gheorghe, Covasna County
- Chilieni, Vaslui, a village in Coroiești Commune, Vaslui County
