= Fundeni =

Fundeni may refer to several places in Romania:

- Fundeni, Bucharest, a neighbourhood in Bucharest
- Fundeni Lake, a lake in Bucharest
- Fundeni, Călărași, a commune
- Fundeni, Galați, a commune
- Fundeni, a village in Secuieni, Bacău
- Fundeni, a village in Zărneşti Commune, Buzău County
- Fundeni, a village in Dobroieşti Commune, Ilfov County
- Fundeni, a village in Gura Vitioarei Commune, Prahova County

== See also ==
- Fundătura (disambiguation)
- Fundoaia (disambiguation)
- Fundata
