= Tagara =

Tagara may refer to:

- Țâgâra, a village in Plopana Commune, Bacău County, Romania
- Ter, Maharashtra, a village in India, identified as the ancient Tagara trading centre mentioned in the Periplus of the Erythraean Sea. Tagara was the important trade centres of ancient India was on the trade route connecting Kalyana with Vengi'
