= Arini =

Arini may refer to:

- Arini (tribe), a tribe within the neotropical parrots
- Arini, a Csángó village in Găiceana Commune, Bacău County, Romania
- Arini, a village in Măieruș Commune, Braşov County, Romania
- Arini, Elis, a village in Elis, Greece
- Arini, an auxlang created in 2020.

== See also ==
- Ariniș
