= Fundătura River =

Fundătura River may refer to the following rivers in Romania:

- Fundături, a tributary of the Borșa in Cluj County
- Fundătura River (Bârlad)
- Fundătura River (Tazlăul Sărat)

== See also ==
- Fundătura (disambiguation)
- Fundoaia River (disambiguation)
- Fundata River
