= Rusenii =

Rusenii may refer to several places in Romania:

- Rusenii Noi, a village in Holboca Commune, Iaşi County
- Rusenii Răzeşti and Rusenii de Sus, villages in Plopana Commune, Bacău County
