= Valea Merilor =

Valea Merilor may refer to several villages in Romania:

- Valea Merilor, a village in Vultureni Commune, Bacău County
- Valea Merilor, a village in Potcoava town, Olt County
