= Colonești =

Coloneşti may refer to several places in Romania:

- Coloneşti, a commune in Bacău County
- Coloneşti, a commune in Olt County
