= Zăpodia =

Zăpodia may refer to several villages in Romania:

- Zăpodia, a village in Colonești Commune, Bacău County
- Zăpodia, a village in Traian Commune, Bacău County
- Zăpodia, a village in Cozieni Commune, Buzău County
- Zapodia, the Hungarian name for Zăpodea village, Sânger Commune, Mureș County
