= Rădăcinești =

Rădăcineşti may refer to several places in Romania:

- Rădăcineşti, a village in Berislăvești Commune, Vâlcea County
- Rădăcineşti, a village in Corbița Commune, Vrancea County
