= Galbeni =

Galbeni may refer to several villages in Romania:

- Galbeni, a village in Filipești Commune, Bacău County
- Galbeni, a village in Nicolae Bălcescu Commune, Bacău County
- Galbeni, a village in Havârna Commune, Botoșani County
- Galbeni, a village in Tănăsoaia Commune, Vrancea County
