= Cosițeni =

Cosiţeni may refer to several villages in Romania:

- Cosiţeni, a village in Brăhășești Commune, Galaţi County
- Cosiţeni, a village in Podu Iloaiei Town, Iaşi County
