= Maria Tacu =

Tacu Maria (born February 15, 1949, in Burdusaci, Bacău County, d. June 18, 2010, Bucharest) was a Romanian poet and prose writer. She graduated from the Alexandru Ioan Cuza University in Iași, with a degree in Literature. She also published under the pen name Maria Constantines.

Her debut was in the Astra magazine (1987) while her first published work was The Hierarchy of Light (Prize of the "Writers Association" from Iași) a volume of poetry (1993). She published her first novel, My Aunt, Anestina in 2000. The main themes of love, loneliness, death and femininity, are found in subsequent novels. In 2005, Yesterday's Word (Vorba de Ieri), a novel about temptation and power is published. In 2008, Women under a Red Tree, another novel about the relationships of art, love and death is published. Her last novel, "Vlad and Katharina" about Vlad the Impaler was published posthumously in 2011.

== Published works ==
- The Hierarchy of Light, Danart, 1993
- My Aunt, Anestina, Cartea Românească, 2000
- Yesterday's Word, Cartea Românească, 2005
- Women under a Red Tree, Polirom, 2008
- Vlad and Katharina, Tracus Arte, 2011
