= Silvia Cambir =

Romanian artist (1924–2007)

- Born: January 24, 1924; Hanu Conachi, Kingdom of Romania
- Died: 2007
- Known for: Painting
- Movement: Expressionism

Silvia Cambir (24 January 1924 – 2007) was a Romanian Expressionist painter, portraitist, and book illustrator.

Born in Hanu Conachi, Galați County, Cambir studied at the Faculty of Literature and Philosophy of the University of Bucharest, as well as at the Bucharest National University of Arts under Camil Ressu. She became a member of the Union of Romanian Visual Artists (UAP) in 1956. Her work has won acclaim from local art critics such as Petru Comarnescu, Ion Frunzetti and Dan Grigorescu. In 2006, she was awarded the annual UAP Grand Prize.

Cambir is the most aged in a group of poets who regularly visit the Bulgarian town of Balchik. Their en plein air works are regularly showcased in group exhibits. She is also the author of a dictionary on Romanian art.

== Awards ==
- 2004 – Samuil Rosei Award
- 2005 – Margareta Sterian Award
- 2006 – UAP Grand Prize
