= Godinești (river) =

- Location within Romania

Location
- Country: Romania
- Counties: Bacău County
- Villages: Năstăseni, Medeleni, Godineștii de Sus, Godineștii de Jos, Reprivăț

Physical characteristics
- Source
  - coordinates: 46°30′10″N 27°09′36″E
  - elevation: 346 m (1,135 ft)
- Mouth: Berheci
  - location: Vultureni
  - coordinates: 46°24′07″N 27°16′07″E
  - elevation: 154 m (505 ft)
- Length: 11 km (6.8 mi)
- Basin size: 37 km^{2} (14 sq mi)

Basin features
- Progression: Berheci→ Bârlad→ Siret→ Danube→ Black Sea

The Godinești is a right tributary of the river Berheci in Romania. It flows into the Berheci in Vultureni. Its length is 11 km (6.8 mi) and its basin size is 37 km^{2} (14 sq mi).
