= Pereschiv =

- Location within Romania

Location
- Country: Romania
- Counties: Bacău, Vrancea, Galați
- Villages: Șendrești, Fântânele, Fichitești, Ciorăști

Physical characteristics
- Mouth: Bârlad
  - location: Ghidigeni
  - coordinates: 46.0763°N 27.5060°E
- Length: 44 km (27 mi)
- Basin size: 242 km^{2} (93 sq mi)

Basin features
- Progression: Bârlad→ Siret→ Danube→ Black Sea
- Tributaries
  - left: Pereschivul Mic
  - right: Căbești, Pleșești

The Pereschiv is a right tributary of the river Bârlad in Romania. It discharges into the Bârlad in Ghidigeni. Its length is 44 km (27 mi) and its basin size 242 km^{2} (93 sq mi). Its source is near the village of Șendrești. Lake Pereschiv is located on this river.
