= Cezar Papacostea =

Romanian writer and translator (1886 – 1936)

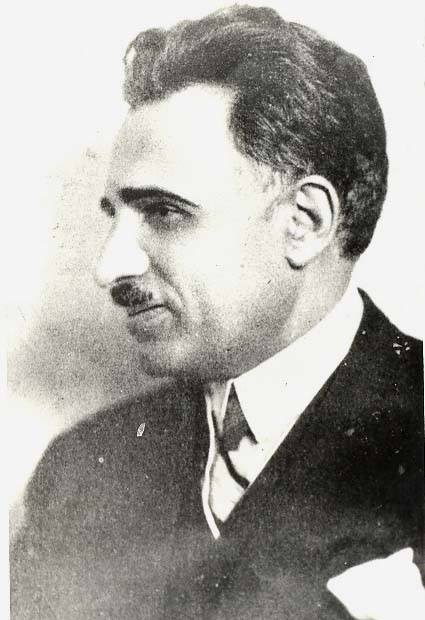
Cezar Papacostea

Cezar Papacostea (1886–July 6, 1936) was an ethnic Aromanian classicist and translator living in Romania.

He was born in Malovišta (Mulovishti), a village in the Ottoman Empire's Manastir Vilayet that today forms part of North Macedonia's Bitola Municipality. His parents were Teofana (née Tonu) and Gușu Papacostea-Goga, both Aromanians and schoolteachers. The family was deeply cultured, and his several brothers pursued distinguished careers: Alexandru became a professor of political economy at Cernăuți University, Petre was a jurist who held important administrative offices and Victor became a historian and professor of Balkan studies at the University of Bucharest. After emigrating to the Kingdom of Romania as a child, Papacostea attended primary and high school in Brăila from 1892 to 1906. From that point until 1910, he studied at the literature and philosophy faculty in Bucharest; Iuliu Valaori was one of his professors.

After graduation, he became a professor of Latin and Greek at the central seminary in Bucharest. He obtained a doctorate in 1922, with a dissertation about tradition and thought in Greek literature; one of the thesis committee members was Nicolae Iorga. In 1923, Papacostea was hired as professor of Greek language and literature at the University of Iași. His students included Petre P. Negulescu, Orest Tafrali, Dionisie M. Pippidi, and N. I. Herescu. He introduced the Erasmic pronunciation of Greek into the Romanian education system.

In 1926, together with Valaori and Dimitrie Evolceanu, he founded Orpheus, a magazine of classical studies. In 1929, it merged with Favonius, a magazine founded by Herescu, resulting in Revista clasică, with Papacostea numbering among the editors. During Alexandru Averescu's time as Prime Minister in the 1920s, he represented Dorohoi in the Assembly of Deputies. At the time, he belonged to Averescu's People's Party, as did his close friend Ștefan Zeletin. Shortly after the latter's death, Papacostea authored the first book-length study of his life and works. In 1935, he was elected a corresponding member of the Romanian Academy. He died the following year in Brăila.

His many books included Evoluția gândirii la greci, 1919; Diodor Sicilianul și opera sa, 1921; Între divin și uman. O problemă a culturii elenice, 1921; Problema destinului în tragedia greacă, 1925; Filosofia antică în opera lui Eminescu, 1930; Platon. Viața. Opera. Filosofia, 1931; Sofiștii în antichitatea greacă, 1934, and Ștefan Zeletin, Viața și opera lui, 1935. Together with Valaori and Gheorghe Popa-Lisseanu, he published editions of classical authors, including Livy, Virgil, and Xenophon; grammars of Latin and Greek; verse manuals and anthologies. He wrote translations of Plato and Homer.
