= Movila =

Movila can refer to:

- Movila, Ialomița, a commune in Ialomiţa County, Romania
- Movila, a village in Niculești Commune, Dâmbovița County, Romania
- Movila, a village in Sălcioara Commune, Dâmbovița County, Romania
- Movila, the Romanian name for Mohylivka village, Lunka Commune, Hertsa Raion, Ukraine
- Movilă (surname)

== See also ==
- Movileni (disambiguation)
- Movilița (disambiguation)
