= Filipeni, Bacău =

Filipeni
- Commune
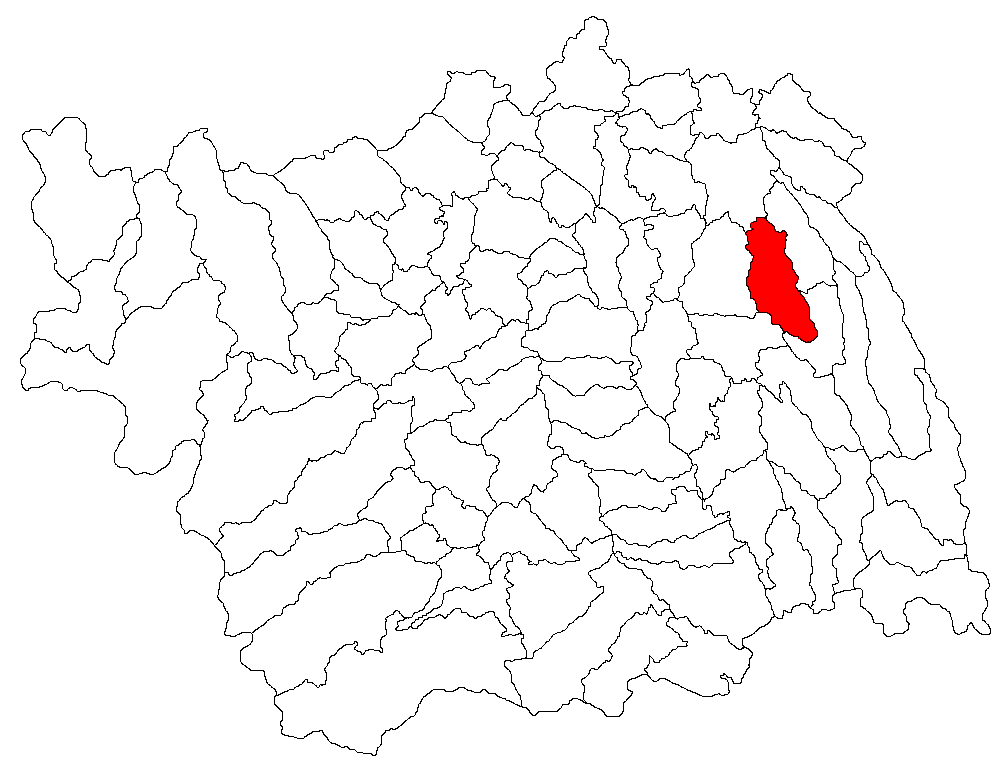
- Location in Bacău County

- Location in Romania
- Coordinates: 46°32′N 27°11′E
- Country: Romania
- County: Bacău

Government
  - Mayor (2024–2028): Rodica Ambrosie (PSD)
- Area: 73.69 km^{2} (28.45 sq mi)
- Elevation: 253 m (830 ft)
- Population (2021-12-01): 2,132
  - Density: 28.93/km^{2} (74.93/sq mi)
- Time zone: UTC+02:00 (EET)
  - Summer (DST): UTC+03:00 (EEST)
- Postal code: 607175
- Area code: +(40) 0234
- Vehicle reg.: BC
- Website: www.primariafilipeni.ro

Filipeni is a commune in Bacău County, Western Moldavia, Romania. It is composed of eight villages: Bălaia, Brad, Filipeni, Fruntești, Mărăști, Pădureni, Slobozia, and Valea Boțului.

The commune is located in the eastern part of the county; it is linked to the north and south by county road DJ241B and by county road DJ252F in the west.
