= Stănișești =

- Commune
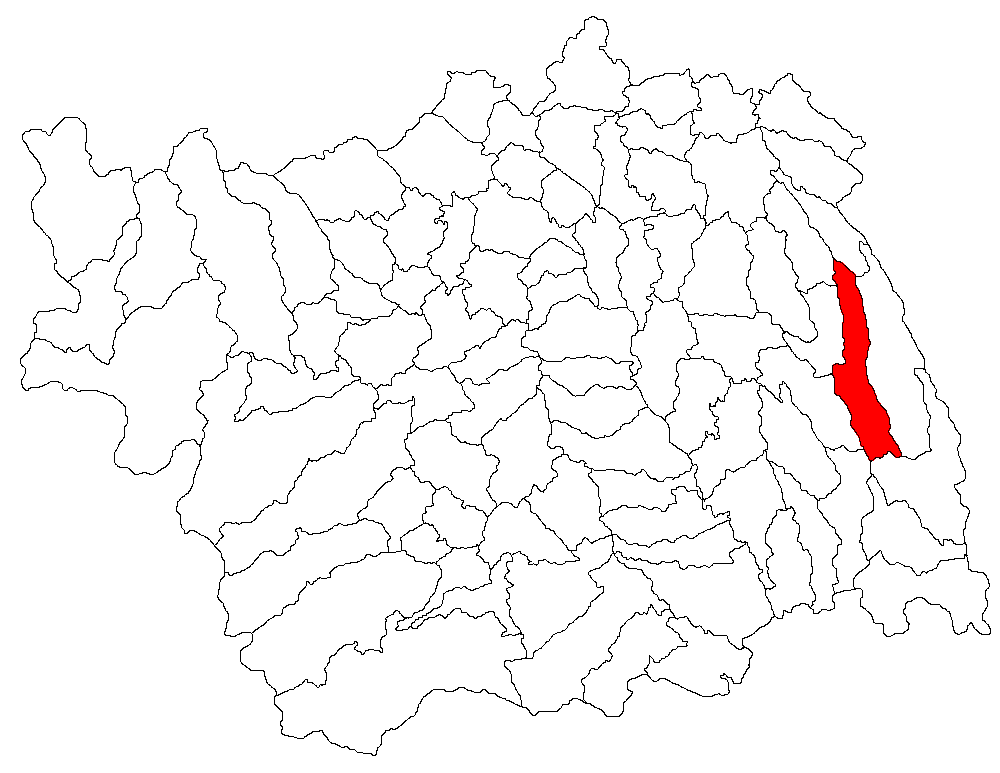
- Location in Bacău County

- Location in Romania
- Coordinates: 46°26′N 27°18′E
- Country: Romania
- County: Bacău

Government
  - Mayor (2024–2028): Teodor Bogdan Popa (PSD)
- Area: 62.3 km^{2} (24.1 sq mi)
- Elevation: 283 m (928 ft)
- Population (2021-12-01): 3,945
  - Density: 63.3/km^{2} (164/sq mi)
- Time zone: UTC+02:00 (EET)
  - Summer (DST): UTC+03:00 (EEST)
- Postal code: 607585
- Area code: +(40) 234
- Vehicle reg.: BC
- Website: comunastanisesti.ro

Stănișești is a commune in Bacău County, Western Moldavia, Romania. It is composed of nine villages: Balotești, Belciuneasa, Benești, Crăiești, Gorghești, Slobozia, Slobozia Nouă, Stănișești, and Văleni.
