= Fundeni, Galați =

Fundeni
- Commune
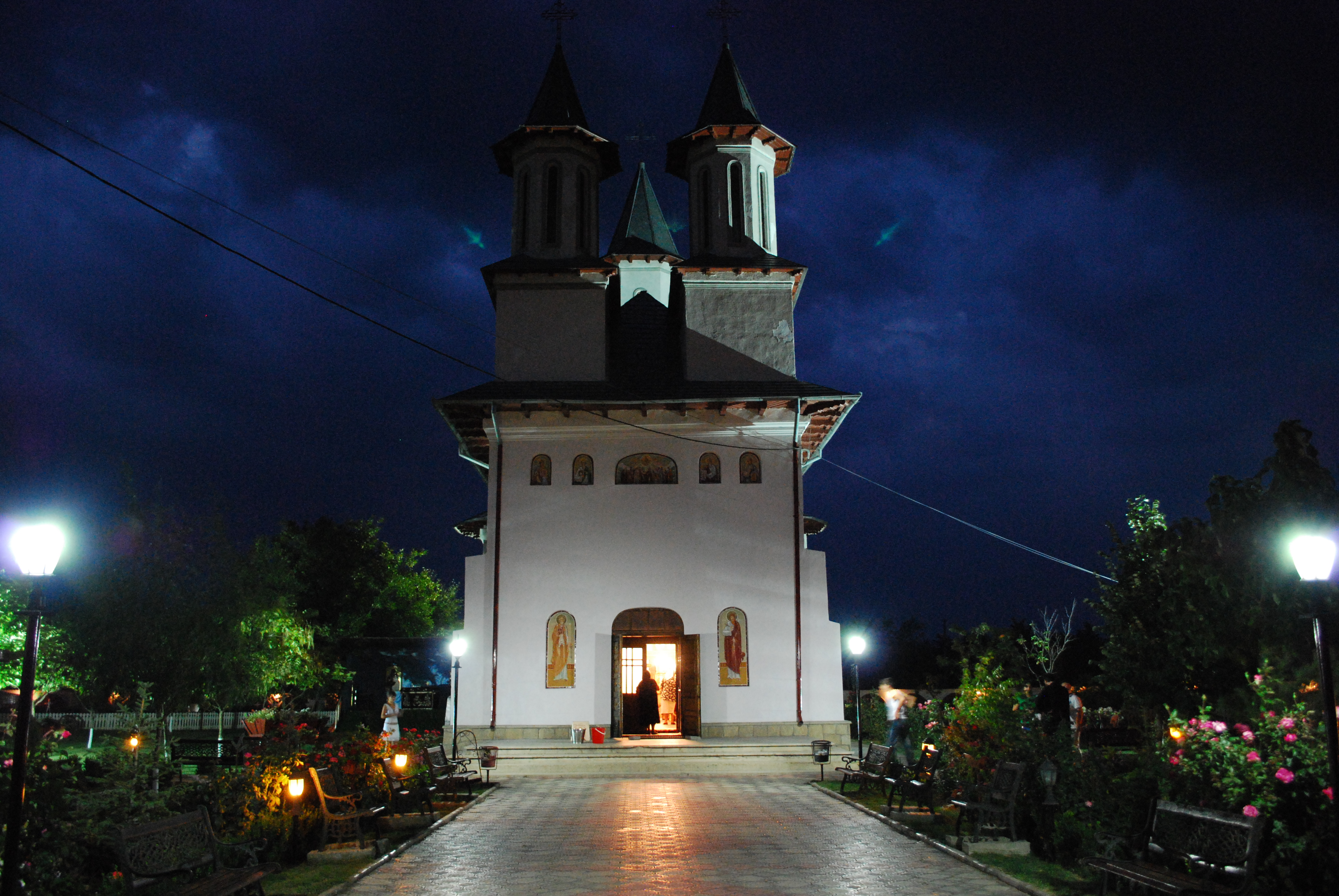

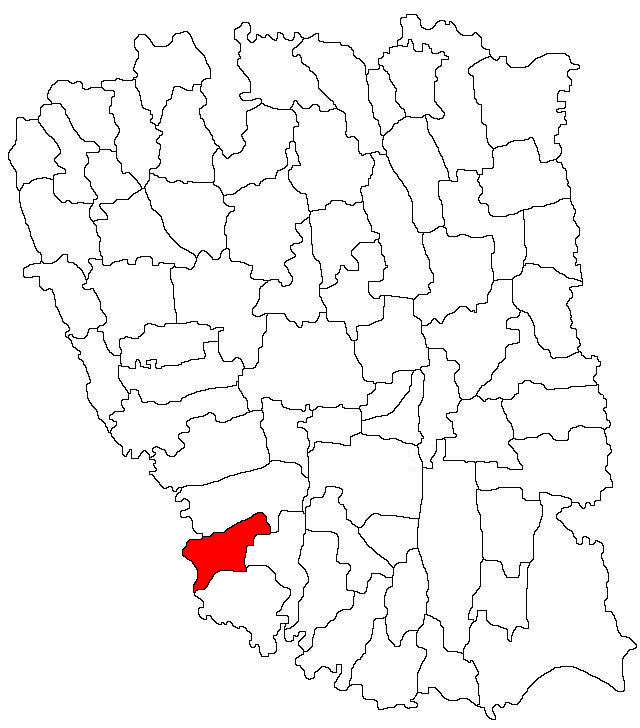
- Location in Galați County

- Location in Romania
- Coordinates: 45.5739°N 27.5590°E
- Country: Romania
- County: Galați

Government
  - Mayor (2024–2028): Manuel Lupu (PSD)
- Area: 42.32 km^{2} (16.34 sq mi)
- Elevation: 20 m (66 ft)
- Population (2021-12-01): 3,020
  - Density: 71.4/km^{2} (185/sq mi)
- Time zone: UTC+02:00 (EET)
  - Summer (DST): UTC+03:00 (EEST)
- Postal code: 807141
- Area code: +(40) 236
- Vehicle reg.: GL
- Website: comunafundeni.ro

Fundeni is a commune in Galați County, Western Moldavia, Romania with a population of 3,020 people as of 2021. It is composed of four villages: Fundeni, Fundenii Noi, Hanu Conachi, and Lungoci.

== Natives ==
- Silvia Cambir (1924–2007), painter, portraitist, and book illustrator
