= Fundoaia =

Fundoaia may refer to several places in Romania:

- Fundoaia, a village in Huruiești Commune, Bacău County
- Fundoaia, a village in Sărmaș Commune, Harghita County
- Fundoaia, a village in Gurghiu Commune, Mureș County

== See also ==
- Fundeni (disambiguation)
- Fundătura (disambiguation)
- Fundata
