= Podu Turcului =

- Commune
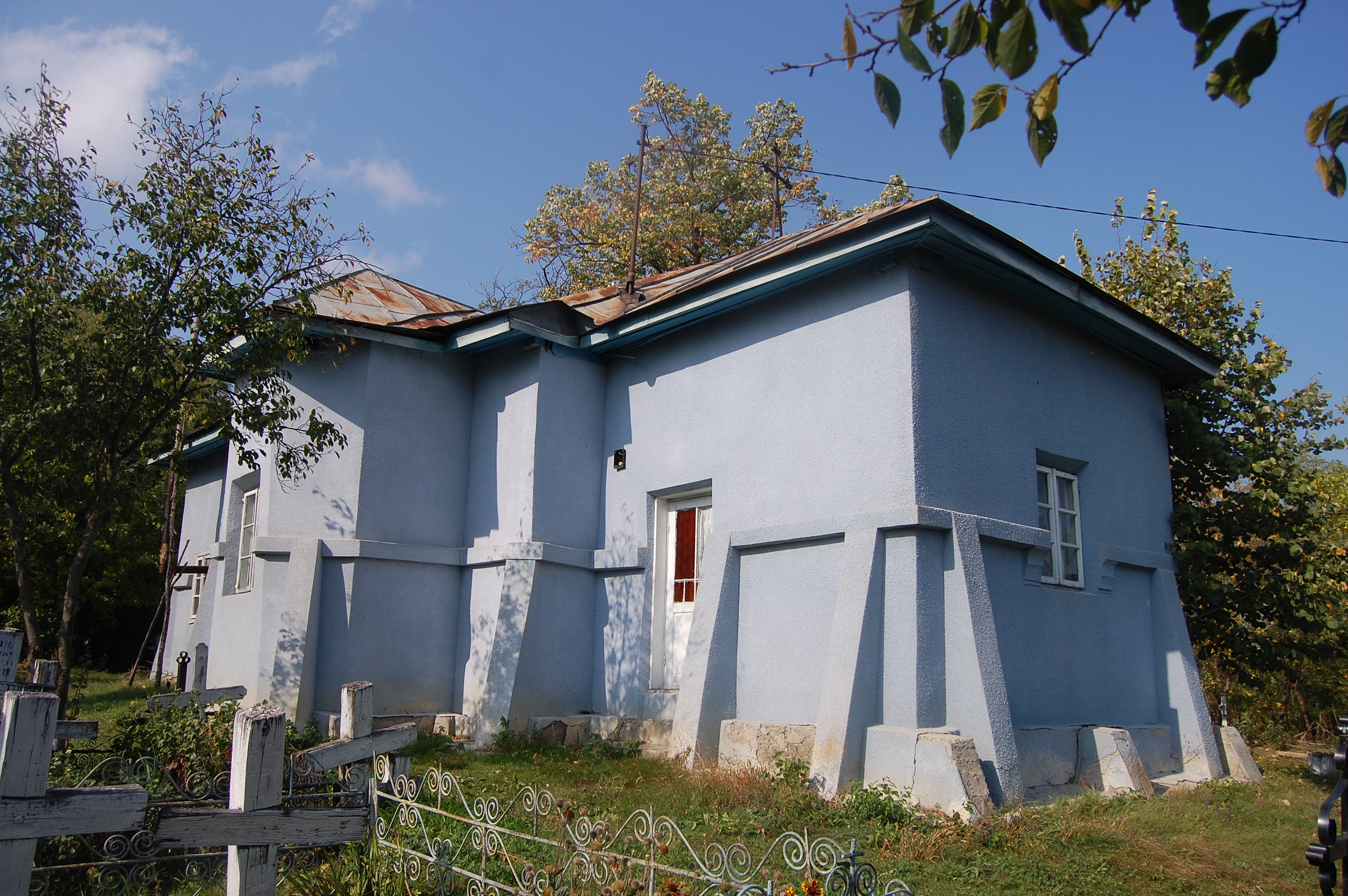
- Wooden church in Fichitești

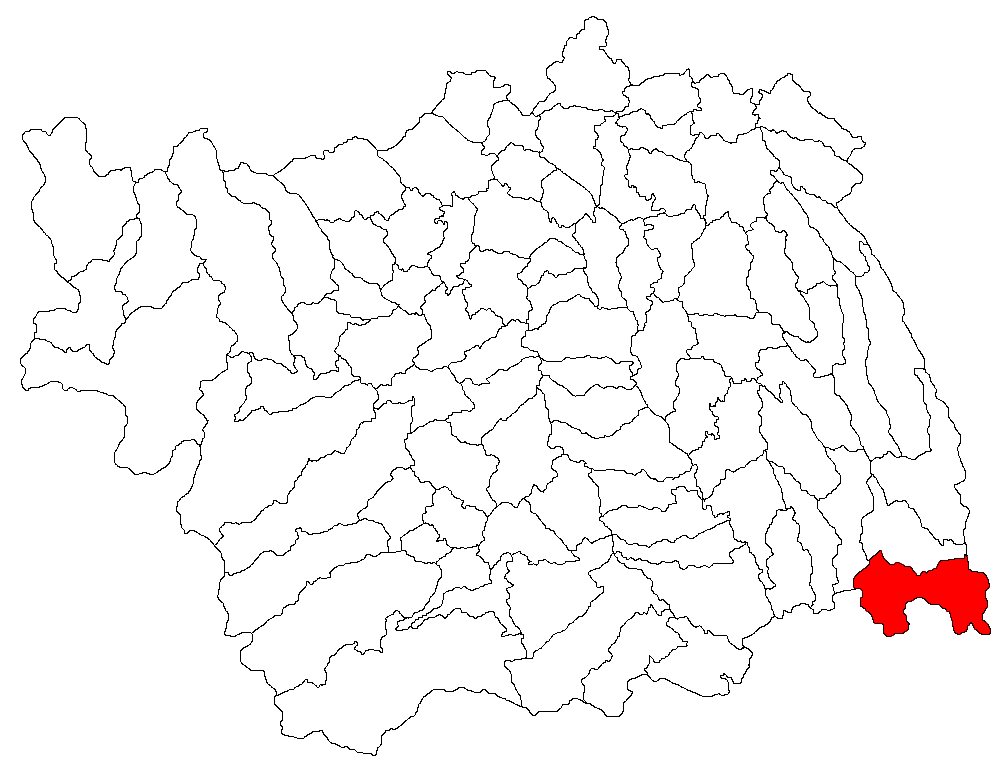
- Location in Bacău County

- Location in Romania
- Coordinates: 46°12′N 27°23′E
- Country: Romania
- County: Bacău

Government
  - Mayor (2024–2028): Gelu Cioravă (PSD)
- Area: 89.47 km^{2} (34.54 sq mi)
- Elevation: 155 m (509 ft)
- Population (2021-12-01): 4,306
  - Density: 48.13/km^{2} (124.7/sq mi)
- Time zone: UTC+02:00 (EET)
  - Summer (DST): UTC+03:00 (EEST)
- Postal code: 607450
- Area code: +(40) 234
- Vehicle reg.: BC
- Website: poduturcului.ro

Podu Turcului is a commune in Bacău County, Western Moldavia, Romania. It is composed of ten villages: Bălănești, Căbești, Fichitești, Giurgioana, Hanța, Lehancea, Plopu, Podu Turcului, Răcușana, and Sârbi.

The commune is situated on the Bârlad Plateau, at an altitude of 155 m (509 ft), on the banks of the rivers Zeletin, Pereschiv, and Pereschivul Mic. It is located in the southeastern extremity of the county, about 70 km (43 mi) from the county seat, Bacău, on the border with Vrancea and Vaslui counties. Podu Turcului is crossed by national road DN11A, which connects it to Bârlad, 30 km (19 mi) to the east and to Onești, 60 km (37 mi) to the west.

During the interwar period, the commune was the seat of plasa Podu Turcului, in Tecuci County.

== Natives ==
- Vasile Măstăcan (born 1968), rower
- Vasile Năstase (born 1962), rower
- Crina Pintea (born 1990), female handball player
- Lucian Vasilache (born 1954), male handball player
