= Glăvănești =

- Commune
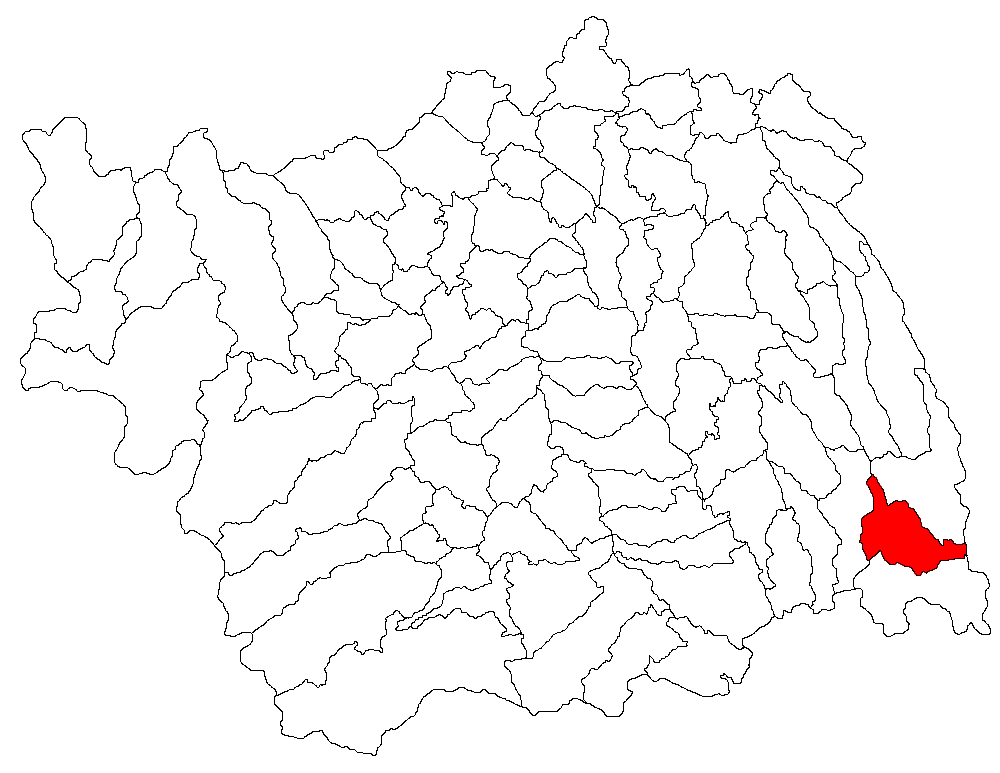
- Location in Bacău County

- Location in Romania
- Coordinates: 46°15′N 27°23′E
- Country: Romania
- County: Bacău

Government
  - Mayor (2024–2028): Adrian Alexandru (PSD)
- Area: 67.2 km^{2} (25.9 sq mi)
- Elevation: 140 m (460 ft)
- Population (2021-12-01): 3,001
  - Density: 44.7/km^{2} (116/sq mi)
- Time zone: UTC+02:00 (EET)
  - Summer (DST): UTC+03:00 (EEST)
- Postal code: 607215
- Area code: +(40) 0234
- Vehicle reg.: BC
- Website: glavanesti.ro

Glăvănești is a commune in Bacău County, Western Moldavia, Romania. It is composed of five villages: Frumușelu, Glăvănești, Muncelu, Putredeni, and Răzeșu.
