= Movilă =

Movilă is a Romanian language noble surname of the Movilești family (see the list of persons there), a Moldavian boyar family.

Notable modern persons with the surname include:

- Movilești § Members
- Boris Movilă, Moldovan writer
- Lică Movilă (born 1961), Romanian footballer
- Sanda Movilă (1900-1970), Romanian poet and novelist

== See also ==
- Movila (disambiguation)
