= Dealu Morii =

- Commune
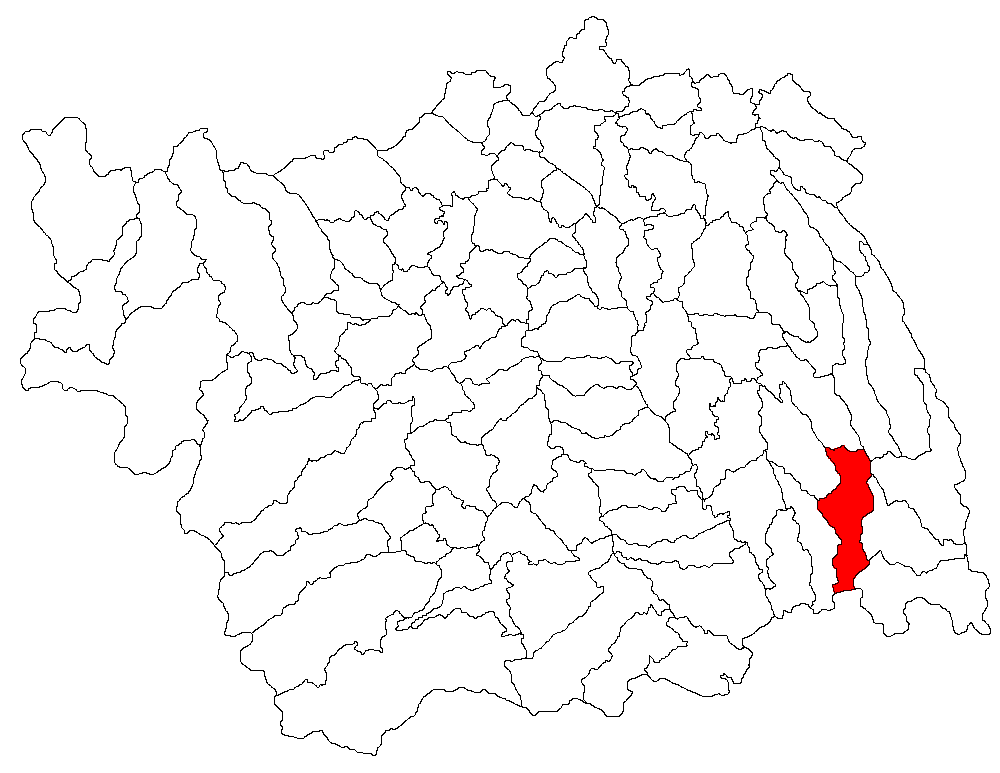
- Location in Bacău County

- Location in Romania
- Coordinates: 46°19′N 27°14′E
- Country: Romania
- County: Bacău

Government
  - Mayor (2024–2028): Gabriel Savin (PSD)
- Area: 40.05 km^{2} (15.46 sq mi)
- Elevation: 150 m (490 ft)
- Population (2021-12-01): 2,549
  - Density: 64/km^{2} (160/sq mi)
- Time zone: EET/EEST (UTC+2/+3)
- Postal code: 607140
- Area code: +(40) 234
- Vehicle reg.: BC
- Website: dealumorii.ro

Dealu Morii is a commune in Bacău County, Western Moldavia, Romania. It is composed of fourteen villages: Banca, Bălănești, Blaga, Boboș, Bodeasa, Bostănești, Calapodești, Căuia, Dealu Morii, Dorofei, Ghionoaia, Grădești, Negulești, and Tăvădărești.
