= Izvoru Berheciului =

- Commune
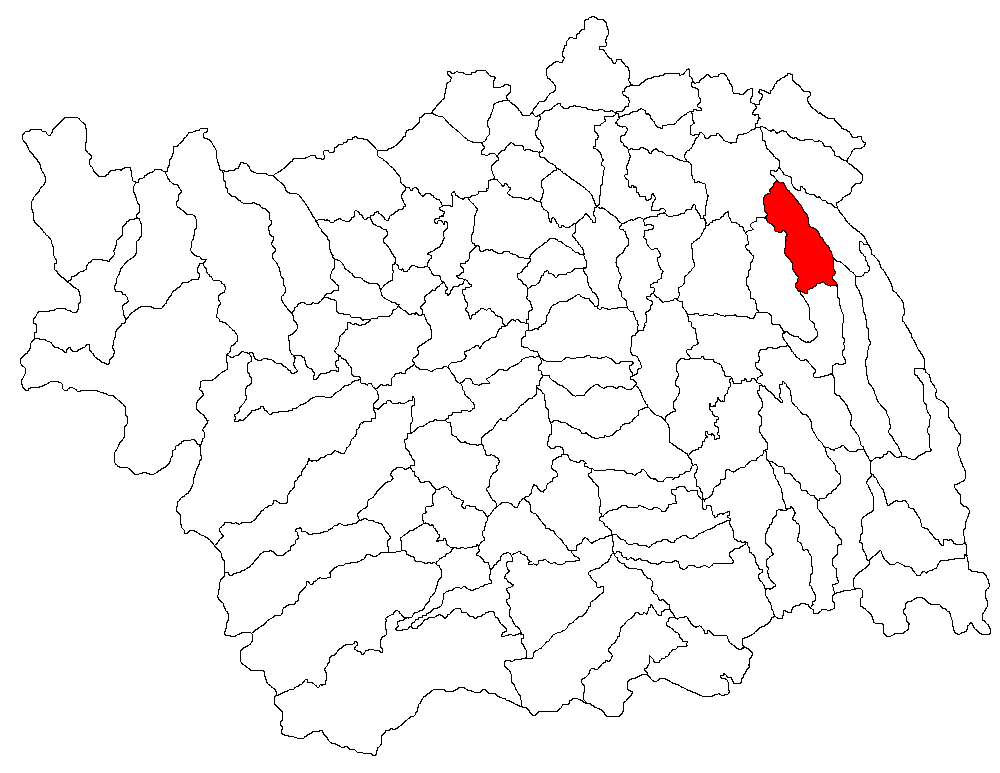
- Location in Bacău County

- Location in Romania
- Coordinates: 46°35′N 27°13′E
- Country: Romania
- County: Bacău

Government
  - Mayor (2024–2028): Ionel Cristofor (PSD)
- Area: 57.13 km^{2} (22.06 sq mi)
- Elevation: 238 m (781 ft)
- Population (2021-12-01): 1,606
  - Density: 28/km^{2} (73/sq mi)
- Time zone: EET/EEST (UTC+2/+3)
- Postal code: 605000
- Area code: +(40) 234
- Vehicle reg.: BC
- Website: primariaizvoruberheciului.ro

Izvoru Berheciului is a commune in Bacău County, Western Moldavia, Romania. It is composed of seven villages: Antohești, Băimac, Făghieni, Izvoru Berheciului, Obârșia, Oțelești, and Pădureni.
