= Gohor =

- Commune
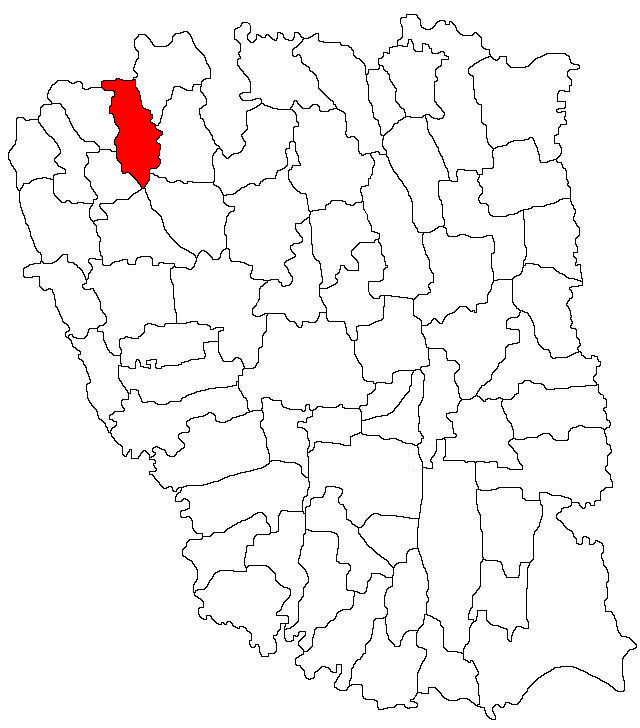
- Location in Galați County

- Location in Romania
- Coordinates: 46°4′N 27°24′E
- Country: Romania
- County: Galați
- Population (2021-12-01): 3,154
- Time zone: EET/EEST (UTC+2/+3)
- Vehicle reg.: GL

Gohor is a commune in Galați County, Western Moldavia, Romania with a population of 3,855 people. It is composed of five villages: Gara Berheci, Gohor, Ireasca, Nărtești and Poșta.
