= Corbița =

- Commune
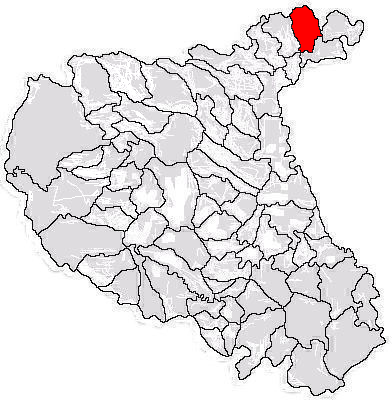
- Location in Vrancea County

- Location in Romania
- Coordinates: 46°9′N 27°18′E
- Country: Romania
- County: Vrancea

Government
  - Mayor (2024–2028): Gheorghiță Lupu (PNL)
- Area: 35.21 km^{2} (13.59 sq mi)
- Elevation: 347 m (1,138 ft)
- Population (2021-12-01): 1,598
  - Density: 45/km^{2} (120/sq mi)
- Time zone: EET/EEST (UTC+2/+3)
- Postal code: 627090
- Area code: (+40) 02 37
- Vehicle reg.: VN
- Website: www.primariacorbita.ro

Corbița is a commune located in Vrancea County, Romania. It is composed of nine villages: Buda, Corbița, Izvoarele, Lărgășeni, Ocheșești, Rădăcinești, Șerbănești (the commune center), Tuțu, and Vâlcelele.

Historical population
Year	Pop.	±%
2002	2,100	—
2011	1,793	−14.6%
2021	1,598	−10.9%
Source: Census data
