= Găiceana =

- Commune
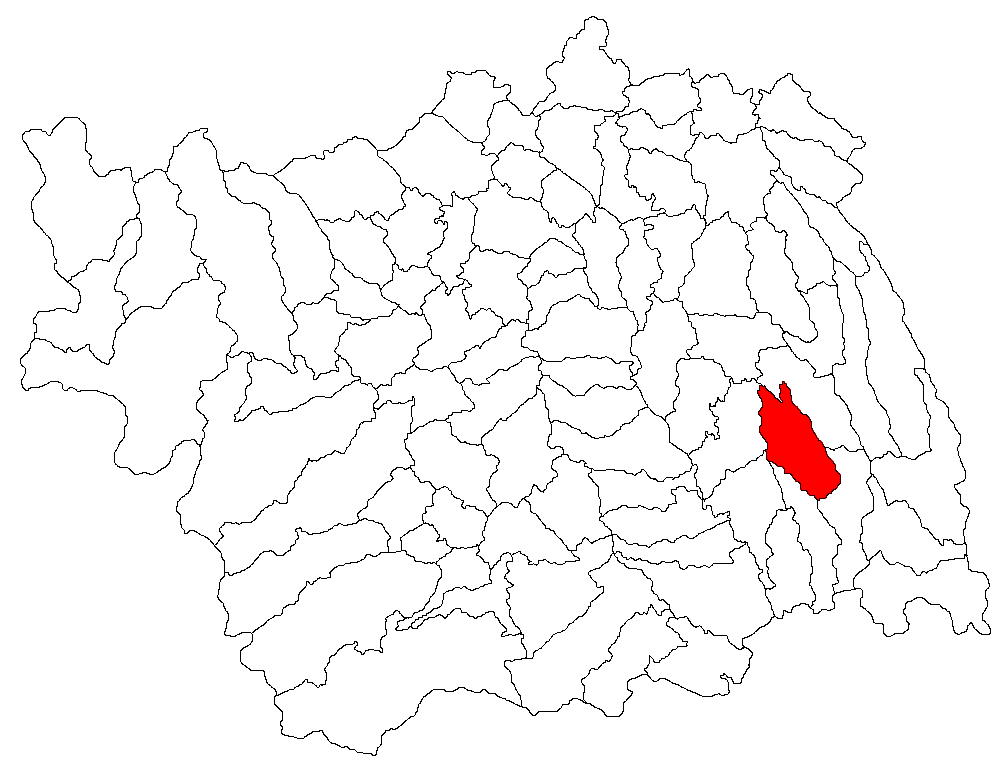
- Location in Bacău County

- Location in Romania
- Coordinates: 46°20′N 27°13′E
- Country: Romania
- County: Bacău

Government
  - Mayor (2024–2028): Alina Gal (UDMR)
- Area: 73.5 km^{2} (28.4 sq mi)
- Elevation: 206 m (676 ft)
- Population (2021-12-01): 2,467
  - Density: 33.6/km^{2} (86.9/sq mi)
- Time zone: UTC+02:00 (EET)
  - Summer (DST): UTC+03:00 (EEST)
- Postal code: 607195
- Area code: +(40) 0234
- Vehicle reg.: BC
- Website: comunagaiceana.ro

Găiceana (Hungarian: Gajcsána) is a commune in Bacău County, Western Moldavia, Romania. It is composed of four villages: Arini, Găiceana, Huțu, and Popești.
