= Oncești, Bacău =

Oncești
- Commune
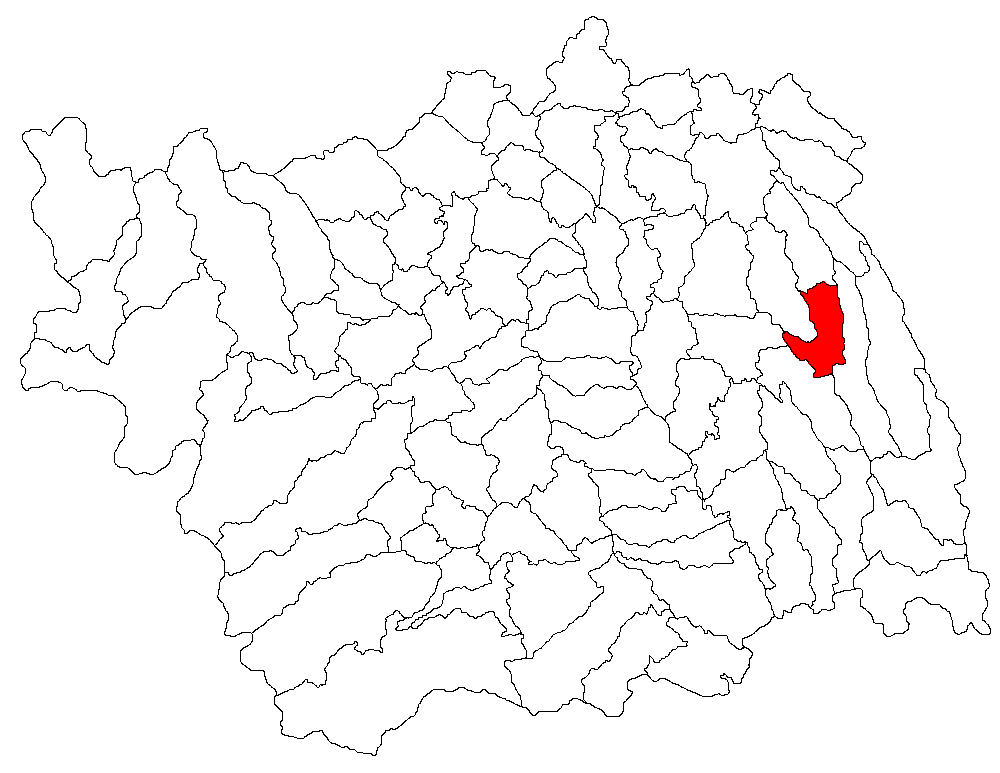
- Location in Bacău County

- Location in Romania
- Coordinates: 46.4790°N 27.2595°E
- Country: Romania
- County: Bacău

Government
  - Mayor (2024–2028): Mihai-Marinel Puțeanu (PSD)
- Area: 47.47 km^{2} (18.33 sq mi)
- Elevation: 157 m (515 ft)
- Population (2021-12-01): 1,406
  - Density: 30/km^{2} (77/sq mi)
- Time zone: EET/EEST (UTC+2/+3)
- Postal code: 607375
- Area code: +(40) 234
- Vehicle reg.: BC
- Website: comunaoncesti.ro

Oncești is a commune in Bacău County, Western Moldavia, Romania. It is composed of seven villages: Bărboasa, Dealu Perjului, Oncești, Onceștii Vechi, Satu Nou, Tarnița, and Taula.

== Natives ==
- Maria Ploae (born 1951), actress
