= Tănăsoaia =

- Commune
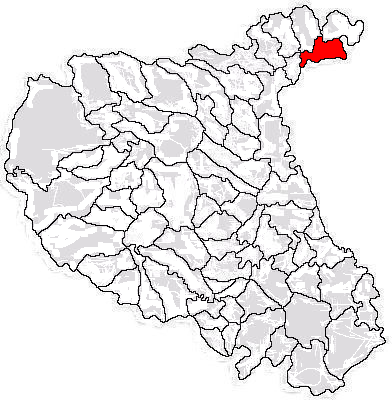
- Location in Vrancea County

- Location in Romania
- Coordinates: 46°07′N 27°24′E
- Country: Romania
- County: Vrancea

Government
  - Mayor (2024–2028): Melania Mocanu (ADU)
- Area: 45 km^{2} (17 sq mi)
- Elevation: 95 m (312 ft)
- Population (2021-12-01): 1,812
  - Density: 40/km^{2} (100/sq mi)
- Time zone: EET/EEST (UTC+2/+3)
- Postal code: 627335
- Area code: +(40) 237
- Vehicle reg.: VN
- Website: primariatanasoaia.ro

Tănăsoaia is a commune located in Vrancea County, Romania. It is composed of ten villages: Călimăneasa, Costișa, Costișa de Sus, Covrag, Feldioara, Galbeni, Nănești, Tănăsoaia, Vladnicu de Jos, and Vladnicu de Sus.

Historical population
Year	Pop.	±%
2002	2,337	—
2011	1,972	−15.6%
2021	1,812	−8.1%
Source: Census data
