= Brăhășești =

- Commune
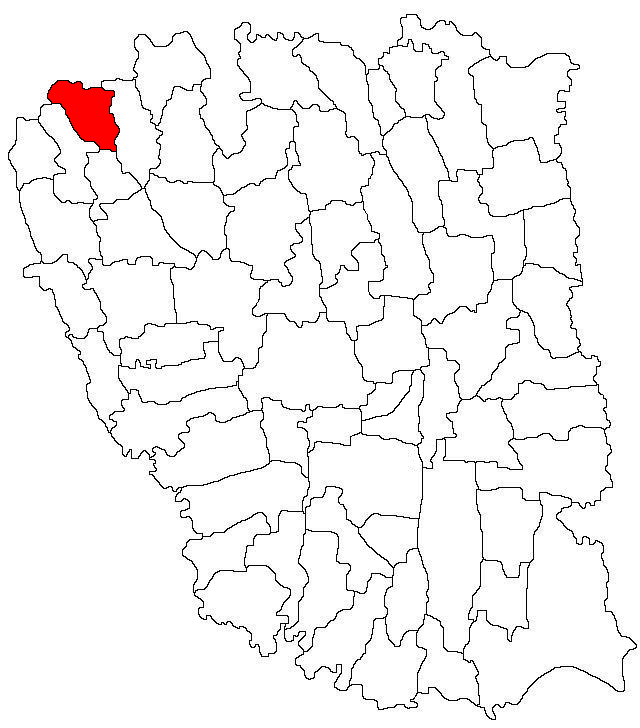
- Location in Galați County

- Location in Romania
- Coordinates: 46°3′N 27°21′E
- Country: Romania
- County: Galați

Government
  - Mayor (2024–2028): Mircea Dumitru (PSD)
- Area: 35.71 km^{2} (13.79 sq mi)
- Elevation: 104 m (341 ft)
- Population (2021-12-01): 9,091
  - Density: 254.6/km^{2} (659.4/sq mi)
- Time zone: UTC+02:00 (EET)
  - Summer (DST): UTC+03:00 (EEST)
- Postal code: 807055
- Area code: (+40) 0236
- Vehicle reg.: GL
- Website: primariabrahasesti.ro

Brăhășești is a commune in Galați County, Western Moldavia, Romania. It is composed of four villages: Brăhășești, Corcioveni, Cosițeni, and Toflea.

Historical population
Year	Pop.	±%
2002	8,276	—
2011	8,847	+6.9%
2021	9,091	+2.8%
Source: Census data

At the 2011 census, the commune had a population of 8,847; of those, 59.17% were Roma and 24.69% Romanians. In 2019 the social affairs officer of the German city of Hagen concluded that some 4,500 Roma had moved there since 2014; according to the statement, about half of the population of Toflea had migrated to Hagen. At the 2021 census, Brăhășești had a population of 9,091; of those, 58.77% were Roma and 21.54% Romanians.
