= Coroiești =

- Commune
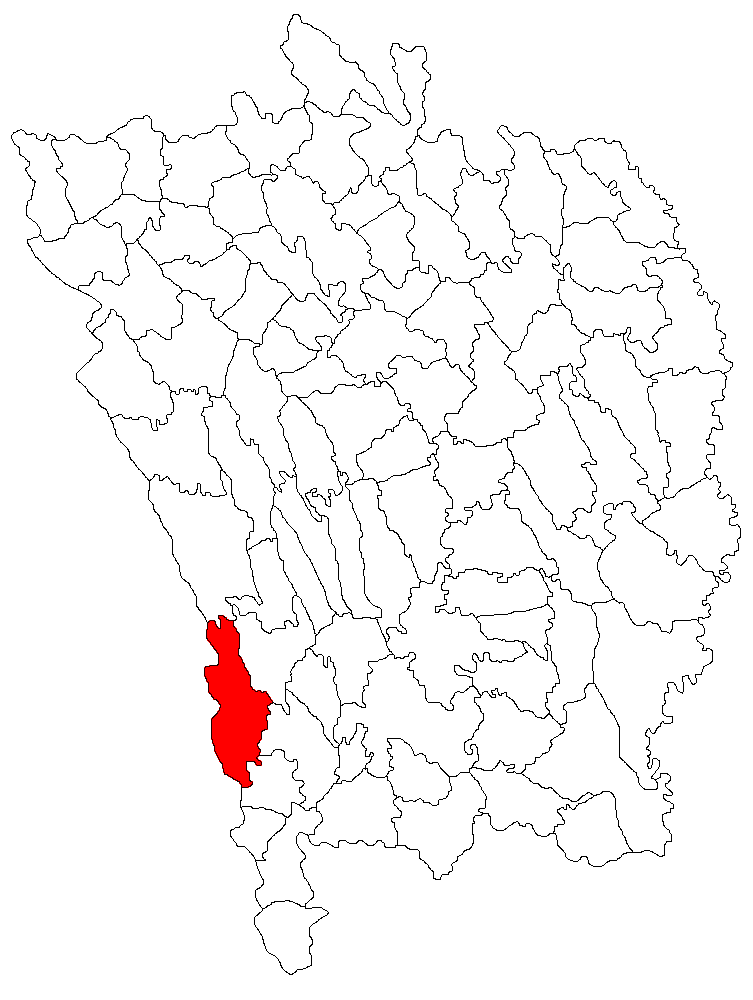
- Location in Vaslui County

- Location in Romania
- Coordinates: 46°15′N 27°29′E
- Country: Romania
- County: Vaslui
- Subdivisions: Chilieni, Coroiești, Coroieștii de Sus, Hreasca, Mireni, Movileni, Păcurărești

Government
  - Mayor (2020–2024): Cristian Lungu (PSD)
- Population (2021-12-01): 1,593
- Time zone: EET/EEST (UTC+2/+3)
- Vehicle reg.: VS

Coroiești is a commune in Vaslui County, Western Moldavia, Romania. It is composed of seven villages: Chilieni, Coroiești, Coroieștii de Sus, Hreasca, Mireni, Movileni, and Păcurărești.

== Natives ==
- Lucia Toader (1960–2013), rower
