= Plopana =

- Commune
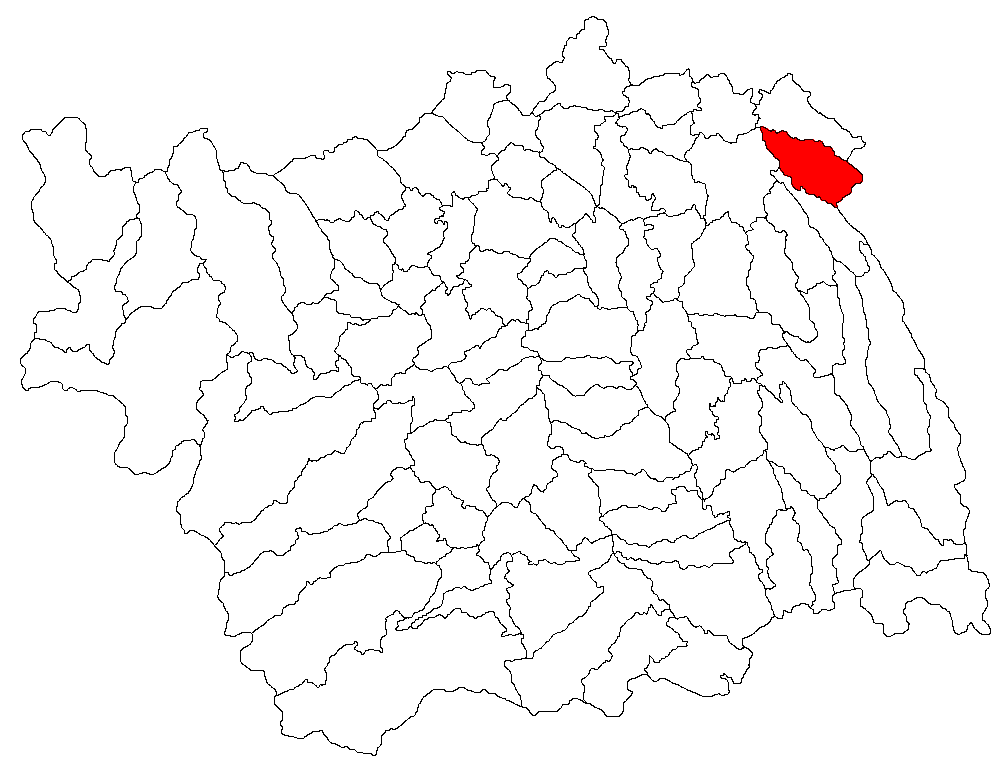
- Location in Bacău County

- Location in Romania
- Coordinates: 46°41′N 27°13′E
- Country: Romania
- County: Bacău

Government
  - Mayor (2024–2028): Vasile Tătaru (PSD)
- Area: 57.26 km^{2} (22.11 sq mi)
- Elevation: 230 m (750 ft)
- Population (2021-12-01): 2,837
  - Density: 49.55/km^{2} (128.3/sq mi)
- Time zone: UTC+02:00 (EET)
  - Summer (DST): UTC+03:00 (EEST)
- Postal code: 607440
- Area code: +(40) 0234
- Vehicle reg.: BC
- Website: www.comunaplopana.ro

Plopana is a commune in Bacău County, Western Moldavia, Romania. It is composed of nine villages: Budești, Dorneni, Fundu Tutovei, Ițcani, Plopana, Rusenii Răzești, Rusenii de Sus, Străminoasa, and Țâgâra.
