= Colonești, Bacău =

Colonești
- Commune
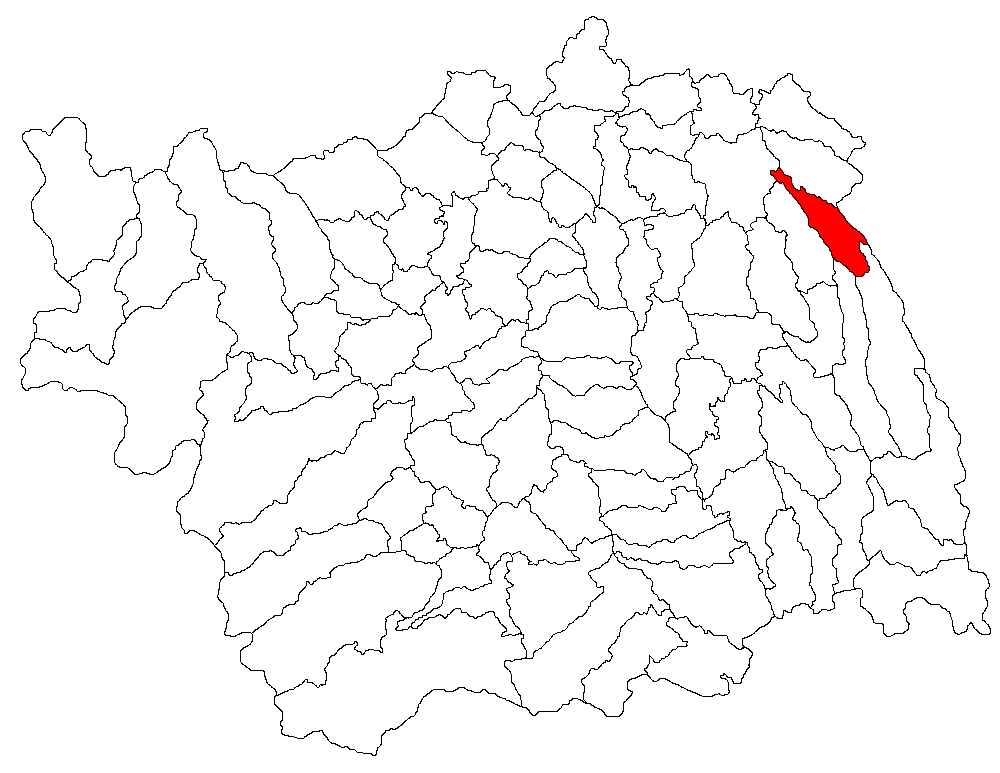
- Location in Bacău County

- Location in Romania
- Coordinates: 46.5921°N 27.2839°E
- Country: Romania
- County: Bacău

Government
  - Mayor (2024–2028): Iancu Valentin Mârzac (PSD)
- Area: 44.68 km^{2} (17.25 sq mi)
- Elevation: 261 m (856 ft)
- Population (2021-12-01): 2,015
  - Density: 45/km^{2} (120/sq mi)
- Time zone: EET/EEST (UTC+2/+3)
- Postal code: 607110
- Area code: +(40) 234
- Vehicle reg.: BC
- Website: primaria-colonesti.ro

Colonești is a commune in Bacău County, Western Moldavia, Romania. It is composed of seven villages: Călini, Colonești, Poiana, Satu Nou, Spria, Valea Mare, and Zăpodia.

Historical population
Year	Pop.	±%
2002	2,176	—
2011	2,106	−3.2%
2021	2,015	−4.3%
Source: Census data
