= Vultureni, Bacău =

Vultureni
- Commune
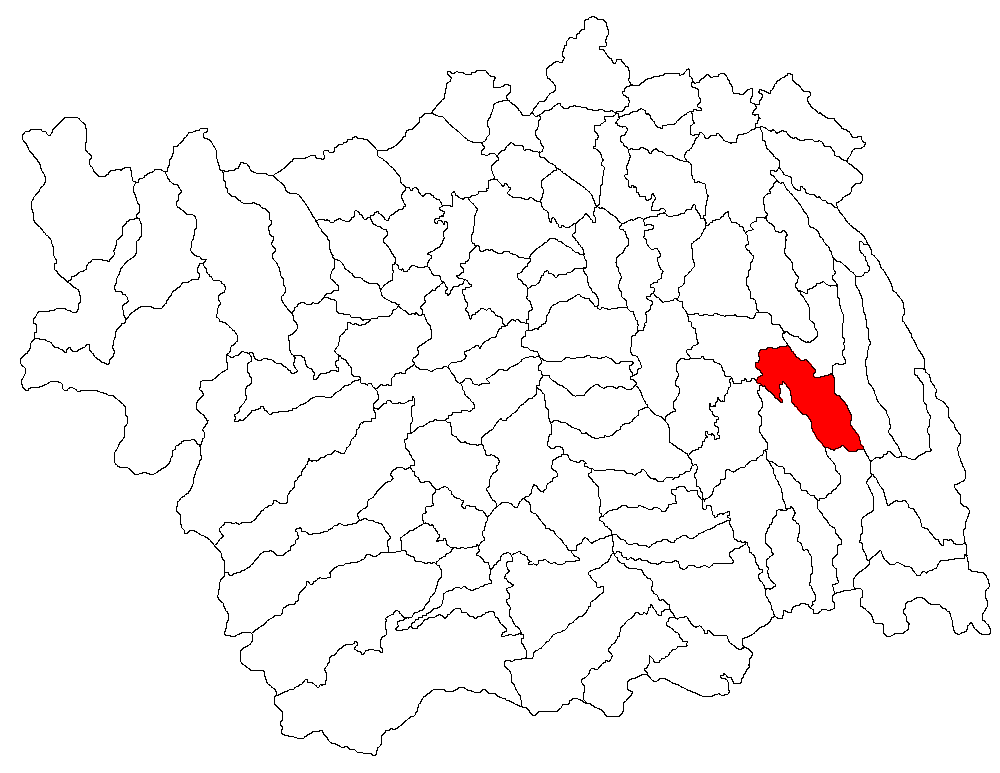
- Location in Bacău County

- Location in Romania
- Coordinates: 46°24′N 27°17′E
- Country: Romania
- County: Bacău

Government
  - Mayor (2024–2028): Iulian Dragomir (ADU)
- Area: 72.47 km^{2} (27.98 sq mi)
- Elevation: 159 m (522 ft)
- Population (2021-12-01): 1,552
  - Density: 21.42/km^{2} (55.47/sq mi)
- Time zone: UTC+02:00 (EET)
  - Summer (DST): UTC+03:00 (EEST)
- Postal code: 607665
- Area code: +(40) 0234
- Vehicle reg.: BC
- Website: www.comunavultureni.ro

Vultureni is a commune in Bacău County, Western Moldavia, Romania. It is composed of sixteen villages: Bosia, Dădești, Dorneni, Ghilăvești, Godineștii de Jos, Godineștii de Sus, Lichitișeni, Medeleni, Nazărioaia, Reprivăț, Tomozia, Țigănești, Valea Lupului, Valea Merilor, Valea Salciei, and Vultureni.
