= Motoșeni =

- Commune
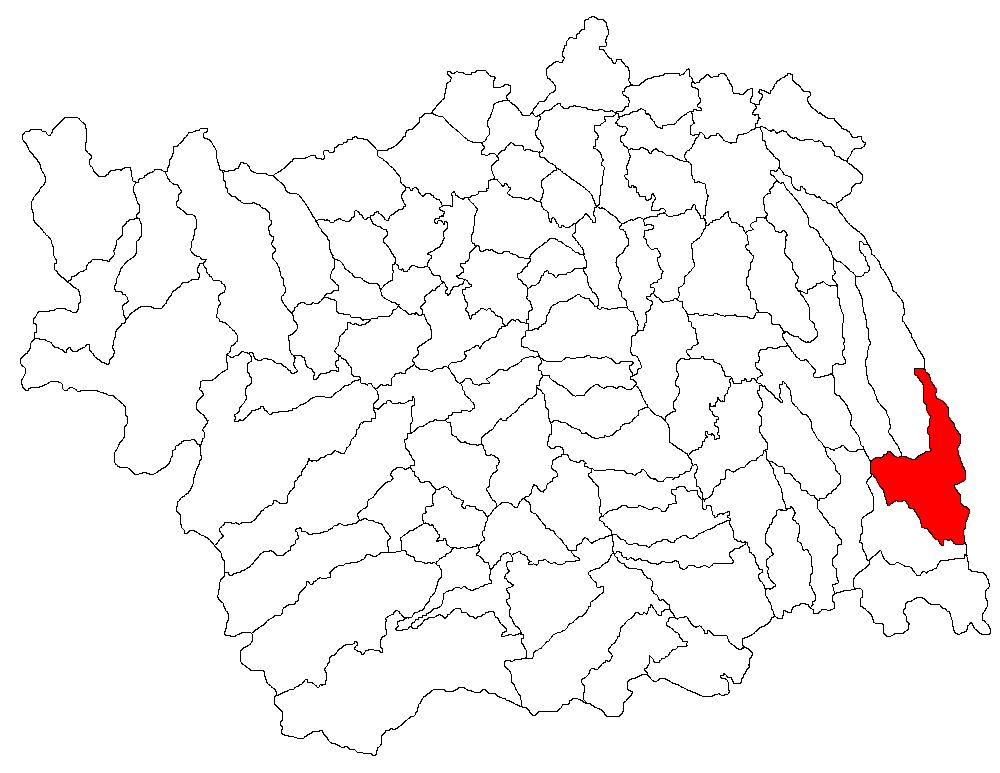
- Location in Bacău County

- Location in Romania
- Coordinates: 46°20′N 27°23′E
- Country: Romania
- County: Bacău

Government
  - Mayor (2024–2028): Corneliu Constantin Ghelase-Armencea (PSD)
- Area: 104.6 km^{2} (40.4 sq mi)
- Elevation: 187 m (614 ft)
- Population (2021-12-01): 2,905
  - Density: 27.77/km^{2} (71.93/sq mi)
- Time zone: UTC+02:00 (EET)
  - Summer (DST): UTC+03:00 (EEST)
- Postal code: 607325
- Area code: +(40) 0234
- Vehicle reg.: BC
- Website: www.comunamotoseni.ro

Motoșeni (formerly Ursa Motoșeni) is a commune in Bacău County, Western Moldavia, Romania. It is composed of fourteen villages: Bâclești, Chetreni, Chicerea, Cociu, Cornățelu, Fântânele, Fundătura, Gura Crăiești, Motoșeni, Poiana, Praja, Rotăria, Șendrești, and Țepoaia.
