= Victor Spinei =

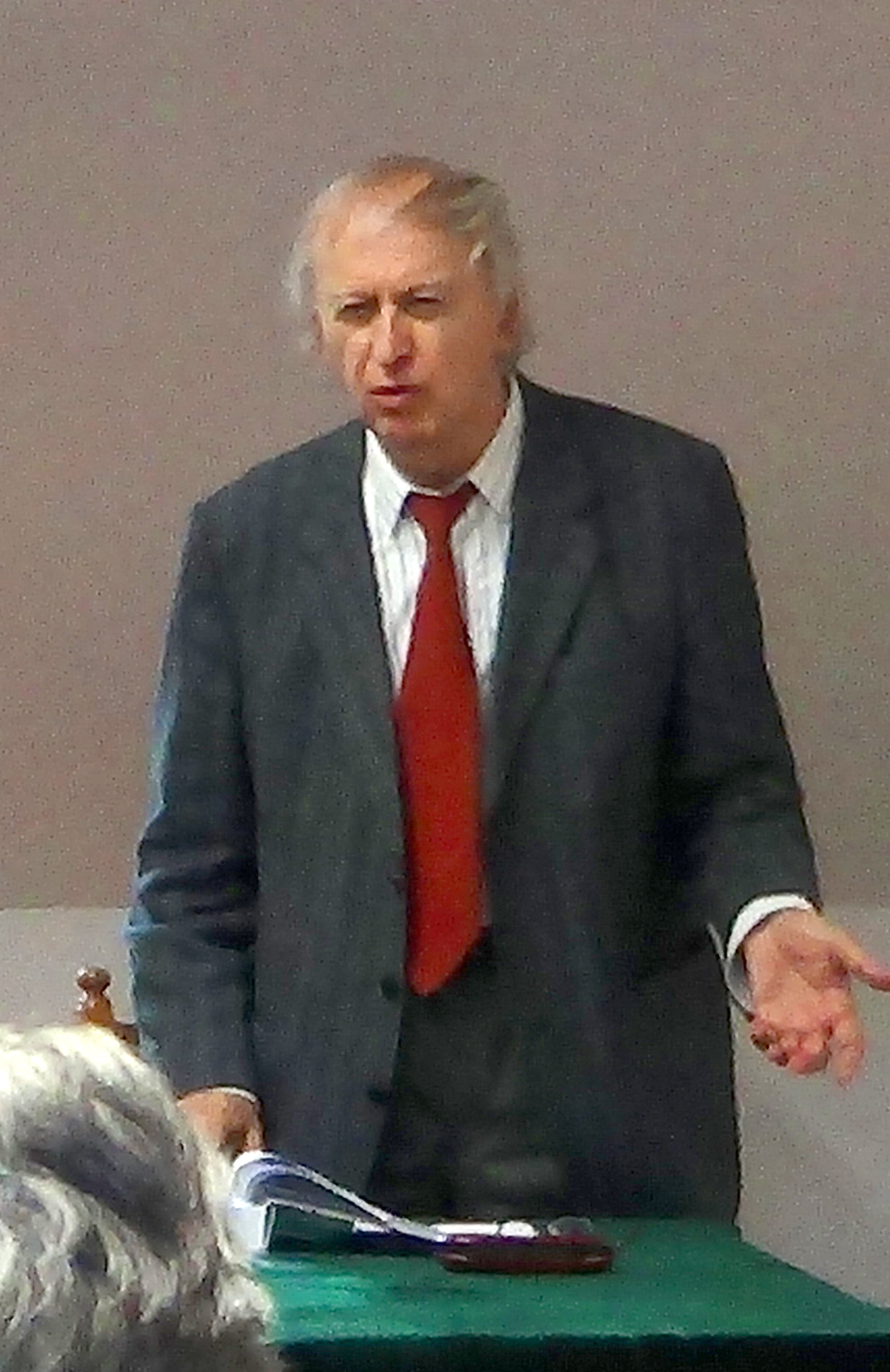
- Victor Spinei in 2013
- Born: October 26, 1943 (age 82); Lozova, Lăpușna County, Kingdom of Romania (now in Moldova)
- Education: Alexandru Ioan Cuza University; University of Bucharest
- Known for: History of Moldavia the Early Middle Ages; History of the Age of Migrations
- Awards: Doctor Honoris Causa of Moldova State University; Order of the Star of Romania, Knight rank
- Scientific career
- Fields: History, Archaeology
- Workplaces: Alexandru Ioan Cuza University
- Doctoral advisors: Ion Nestor; Ștefan Ștefănescu

Victor Spinei (born 26 October 1943) is Emeritus Professor of history and archaeology at the Alexandru Ioan Cuza University and titular member of the Romanian Academy. He is a specialist on the history of Moldavia and the Moldavian people in the Early and High Middle Ages, the history of migratory peoples in Eastern and Southeastern Europe during this period, and the production and circulation of cult objects in Eastern and Southeastern Europe during the Middle Ages.

== Education ==
He was born in Lozova, Lăpușna County, Kingdom of Romania, the son of Alexe Spinei and Nadejda Spinei (née Boțan). In 1961 Spinei graduated from the Costache Negruzzi High School in Iasi. In 1966 he received a Bachelor of Science in History and Philosophy from the Alexandru Ioan Cuza University, after which he specialised at the Institute for Prehistory and Historical Archaeology from Saarland University (1973–1974). In 1977 he earned a PhD from the Nicolae Iorga Institute of History in Bucharest, under Ștefan Ștefănescu (initially under Ion Nestor at the University of Bucharest).

== Career ==
Between 1966 and 1990 Spinei was a researcher at the A.D. Xenopol Institute of History and Archaeology of the Romanian Academy in Iași. The archaeology section split in 1990, forming the Iași Institute of Archaeology (likewise under the aegis of the Romanian Academy), in which Spinei continued his work until 2012. He was the director of the Iași Institute of Archaeology between 2003 and 2011, and has been an Honorary Director since 2014. Since 2015 he has been a corresponding member of the German Archaeological Institute.

Since 1990 he has been a faculty member at Alexandru Ioan Cuza University in Iași. He has also lectured as guest professor at the Free University of Berlin (Institut für Prähistorische Archäologie), the University of Mainz (Historisches Seminar), the University of Konstanz (Fachbereich: Geschichte und Soziologie), the University of Freiburg (Institut für Archäologische Wissenschaften / Fachbereich: Frühgeschichtliche Archäologie und Archäologie des Mittelalters), and Moldova State University in Chișinău.

Between 2001 and 2015 Spinei was a corresponding member of the Romanian Academy; he became a titular member of the Academy on July 5, 2015, and was elected vice president on November 27, 2015.

He is member of several editorial boards, including Arheologia Moldovei, Dacia, Historia Urbana, Studii și Cercetări de Istorie Veche și Arheologie, Res Historica, and Acta Euroasiatica; he also founded and coordinates several academic book series published by the Alexandru Ioan Cuza University and the Romanian Academy.

Since 2012 he has been a member of the Commission for History and Cultural Studies of the Romanian National Council for Attesting Titles, Diplomas and University Certificates.

== Honors and awards (selected) ==
- Nicolae Iorga Award of the Romanian Academy (1982)
- Doctor Honoris Causa of Moldova State University, Chișinău (2012)
- Professor Emeritus of the Alexandru Ioan Cuza University of Iași (2012)
- Order of the Star of Romania, Knight rank (2017)

== Selected works ==
=== Monographs ===
==== In Romanian ====
- Moldova în secolele XI-XIV, Editura Științifică și Enciclopedică, Bucharest, 1982.
- Spinei, Realități etnice și politice în Moldova Meridională în secolele X-XIII. Români și turanici, Editura Junumea, Iași, 1985.
- Marile migrații din estul și sud-estul Europei în secolele IX-XIII, Editura Institutului European, Iași, 1999.

==== In English ====
- Moldavia in the 11th-14th Centuries, Editura Academiei Române, București, 1986.
- The Great Migrations in the East and South East of Europe from the Ninth to the Thirteenth Century, first edition: Romanian Cultural Institute, Cluj-Napoca, 2003, ISBN 9789738589452; second edition: Hakkert Publisher, Amsterdam, 2006, ISBN 90-256-1207-5 (volume 1) and ISBN 90-256-1214-8 (volume 2).
- The Romanians and the Turkic Nomads North of the Danube Delta from the Tenth to the Mid-Thirteenth Century, Brill, Leiden–Boston, 2009, ISBN 978-90-04-17536-5.

==== In French ====
- Les Princes Martyrs Boris et Gleb. Iconographie et Canonisation, Archaeopress, Oxford, 2011, ISBN 978-1-4073-0902-6.
- Mongolii și românii în sinteza de istorie ecleziastică a lui Tholomeus din Lucca / Les Mongols et les Roumains dans la synthèse d’histoire ecclesiastique de Tholomeus de Lucca, Editura Universității "Al. I. Cuza", Iași, 2012, ISBN 978-973-703-737-4.
