= Romanian Academy in Rome =

Coordinates: 41°55′0.79″N 12°28′46.25″E

- Established: 1920
- Location: Rome, Italy
- Type: Research center
- Website: Official website

The Romanian Academy in Rome (Romanian: Școala română din Roma, Italian: Accademia di Romania in Roma) is a research institution under the aegis of the Romanian Academy, founded in 1920 by an initiative of archaeologist Vasile Pârvan and historian Nicolae Iorga. The site of the Romanian Academy in Rome is on the Pincio (Pincian Hill), near the Villa Borghese gardens, in Rome, Italy. The villa housing the Romanian Academy in Rome dates from 1933 and was designed by Petre Antonescu.

== See also ==
- American Academy in Rome
- British School at Rome
- Deutsche Akademie Rom Villa Massimo
- Romanian Academy
- Nicolae Iorga Institute of History
- Vasile Pârvan Institute of Archaeology
- Iași Institute of Archaeology
- Institute of Archaeology and Art History, Cluj-Napoca
- Romanian Cultural Institute
