= Archaeology of Romania =

The archaeology of Romania began in the 19th century with the establishment of the Vasile Pârvan Institute of Archaeology in Bucharest in 1834 (since 1866 as part of the Romanian Academy). The institute has been publishing the journal Dacia since 1924. The National Museum of Antiquities, established in the 19th century, was merged into the Institute in 1956.

The journal Arheologia Moldovei ("Archaeology of Moldavia") was founded in 1961 in Iași, and has been published there ever since. The Iași Institute of Archaeology, founded in 1990 as part of the Romanian Academy, has taken over its publication. That same year, the Institute of Archaeology and Art History, Cluj-Napoca was founded as well.

Archaeological looting in Romania has been a recurring issue in the early 21st century.

In the 20th and 21st centuries, increasing numbers of women have entered the profession of archaeologists.

== Archaeologists ==
- Alexandru Odobescu (1834—1895)
- Grigore Tocilescu (1850–1909)
- Vasile Pârvan (1882–1927)
- Constantin Daicoviciu (1898–1973)

living

- Gheorghe I. Cantacuzino (b. 1938)

== Institutes ==
- Institute of Archaeology and Art History in Cluj-Napoca
- Vasile Pârvan Institute of Archaeology in Bucharest

== Museums ==
- Archaeology Museum Piatra Neamț
- Iron Gates Region Museum
- Museum of Dacian and Roman Civilisation
- National Museum of Romanian History
- National Museum of Transylvanian History

== Sites ==
- Acidava (Enoşeşti) – Dacian, Roman
- Apulon (Piatra Craivii) – Dacian
- Apulum (Alba Iulia) – Roman, Dacian
- Argedava (Popeşti) – Dacian, possibly Burebista's court or capital
- Argidava (Vărădia) – Dacian, Roman
- Basarabi (Calafat) – Basarabi culture (8th - 7th centuries BC), related to Hallstatt culture
- Boian Lake – Boian culture (dated to 4300–3500 BC)
- Callatis (Mangalia) – Greek colony
- Capidava – Dacian, Roman
- Cernavodă – Cernavodă culture, Dacian
- Coasta lui Damian (Măerişte)
- Dacian Fortresses of the Orăştie Mountains
- Drobeta – Roman
- Giurtelecu Şimleului
- Histria – Greek colony
- Lumea Noua (near Alba Iulia) – middle Neolithic to Chalcolithic
- Napoca (Cluj-Napoca) – Dacian, Roman
- Peștera cu Oase – the oldest early modern human remains in Europe
- Porolissum (near Zalău) – Roman
- Potaissa (Turda) – Roman
- Sarmizegetusa Regia – Dacian capital
- Sarmizegetusa Ulpia Traiana – Roman capital of province of Dacia
- Trophaeum Traiani/Civitas Tropaensium (Adamclisi) – Roman
- Tomis (Constanţa) – Greek colony
- Ziridava/Şanţul Mare (Pecica) – Dacian, Pecica culture, 16 archaeological horizons have been distinguished, starting with the Neolithic and ending with the Feudal Age

== Cultures ==
- Basarabi culture
- Boian culture
- Bug-Dniester culture
- Bükk culture
- Cernavoda culture
- Chernyakhov culture
- Coțofeni culture
- Cucuteni-Trypillian culture
- Danubian culture
- Dudeşti culture
- Globular Amphora culture
- Gumelniţa-Karanovo culture
- Hamangia culture
- La Tène culture
- Linear Pottery culture
- Lipiţa culture
- Otomani culture
- Pecica culture
- Tiszapolgár culture
- Usatovo culture
- Vinča culture
- Wietenberg culture
- Getae
- Dacians
- Roman

== Literature ==
- Alexandru Odobescu, Istoria arheologiei, 1877

== Publications ==
- Dacia by Vasile Pârvan Institute of Archaeology, published continuously since 1924

== See also ==
- List of Romanian archaeologists
- History of Romania
- Prehistory of Transylvania
- Bronze Age in Romania
- Archaeological looting in Romania
- Thracology
  - Dacology
    - Dacianism
