= Dacia (disambiguation) =

Dacia is a historic region in southeastern Europe.

Dacia may also refer to:

== Places ==
=== Historical ===
- Roman Dacia/Dacia Traiana, Dacia Felix (106–271/75), ancient Roman province north of the Danube; also there: Dacia Superior, Dacia Inferior/Dacia Malvensis, Dacia Apulensis, Dacia Porolissensis
- Dacia Aureliana (271/75-280s), ancient Roman province south of the Danube
- Dacia Ripensis (c. 283-586), ancient Roman province in the northern part of partitioned Dacia Aureliana
- Dacia Mediterranea (320s – c. 602), ancient Roman province in the southern part of partitioned Dacia Aureliana
- Diocese of Dacia (c. 337 – c. 602), Late Roman/Byzantine administrative province south of the Danube
- Dacia (Scandinavia), a medieval Latin name for Denmark or the Nordic region in general

=== Modern ===
- Dacia, neighbourhood of Bălți town, Moldova
- Dacia village, part of Doba commune, Satu Mare County, Romania
- Dacia village, Brașov County, Romania
- Dacia village, part of Nicșeni commune, Botoșani County, Romania
- Diocese of Dacia Felix, the Romanian Orthodox diocese of the Romanians in Serbia

== Literature ==
- Dacia (journal), a Romanian academic journal of archaeology
- Dacia: An Outline of the Early Civilization of the Carpatho-Danubian Countries, book by V. Pârvan
- Editura Dacia, a Romanian publisher

== People ==
- Dacia Arcaráz (born 1967), Mexican actress
- Dacia Grayber (fl. from 2020), American firefighter and politician
- Dacia Maraini (born 1936), Italian writer
- Dacia Valent (1963–2015), Somali-born Italian politician and Member of the European Parliament

== Sport ==
- FC Dacia Chișinău, or simply Dacia, a former Moldovan football team
- Orășenesc Stadium (Mioveni), formerly Dacia Stadium, in Romania
- Stadionul Dacia (Orăștie), a football stadium in Romania

== Other uses ==
- Automobile Dacia, commonly known as Dacia, a Romanian car manufacturer
- Dacia Hotel, in Satu Mare, Romania

== See also ==
- Dacian (disambiguation)
- Dacicus (disambiguation)
- Dacia Literară, an 1840 Romanian literary and political journal
- Dacorum, district (borough) in England
