= Tahsin Gemil =

Romanian historian, diplomat, and politician

Tahsin or Tasin Gemil (Dobrujan Tatar: Tahsin Ğemil; born September 21, 1943) is a Romanian historian, translator, diplomat, and politician. He served as a member of the Chamber of Deputies between 1990 and 1996, and was Ambassador to Azerbaijan (1998–2003) and Turkmenistan (since 2004). The author of over 100 works on the Ottoman Empire and Romanian history, he has translated into Romanian documents written in Ottoman Turkish. Gemil is also a professor at the Ovidius University in Constanța, Romania (its Prorector since 2004).

== Life and career ==
Born in Medgidia to an ethnic Tatar Muslim family, Gemil completed primary and secondary studies in his native town, and graduated from the Faculty of History and Philosophy at the University of Iași (1965), where he later received a PhD. He was employed by the A.D. Xenopol Institute of History within the University of Iași, and later by the Nicolae Iorga Institute of History in Bucharest. A native speaker of Crimean Tatar and Romanian, Gemil has studied Ottoman and Modern Turkish, Turkmen, and Azerbaijani, as well as having a grasp of English, French, Uzbek, Kazakh and Kyrgyz.

In the months following the 1989 Revolution, Gemil joined the new provisional governing authority, CPUN, created around the National Salvation Front. After the 1990 legislative election, he represented Constanța County in the Chamber, sitting with the Turkish Democratic Union (UDTR) group, serving on the Committee for Education, Science, Youth and Sport, as well as on the Committee on Human Rights, Religious Affairs and National Minority Issues. He was among the founding members of the Democratic Union of Turco-Islamic Tatars of Romania (UDTTR), and its first president, being reelected for the same constituency in the 1992 suffrage (after which Gemil was Secretary of the Education Committee). He was among the members of Parliament on the delegation sent to the Organization of the Black Sea Economic Cooperation.

He is married to Nafiye Gemil, and has fathered a daughter (born in 1970).
