= Căpotești =

Căpoteşti may refer to several places in Romania:

- Căpoteşti, a village in Huruiești Commune, Bacău County
- Căpoteşti, a village in Pădureni Commune, Vaslui County
