= List of monumente istorice in Romania =

Romania's major historical sites, known as monumente istorice ("Historic monuments"), are listed in the National Register of Historic Monuments in Romania, which was created between 2004 and 2005. As of 2015, 30,148 Heritage sites are entered in the National Cultural Heritage of Romania. The list is maintained by the Romanian National Institute of Historical Monuments, part of the Ministry of Culture and National Patrimony Romania.

== List by County ==
=== Alba County ===
| Number | LMI code | Site Name | Town/City | Popular Name/Address | Period |
|---|---|---|---|---|---|
| 1 | AB-I-s-A-00001 | Archaeological site of Alba Iulia | Alba Iulia | Entire territory | 2nd – 4th century |
| 2 | AB-I-m-A-00001.01 | Legio XIII Gemina's Castrum | Alba Iulia | Central zone of the Vauban fortifications | 2nd – 4th century, Roman era |
| 3 | AB-I-m-A-00001.02 | Civilian settlement | Alba Iulia | Near Roman fort | 2nd – 4th century, Roman era |
| 4 | AB-I-s-A-00002 | Ancient city of Apulum | Alba Iulia | Partoș neighbourhood | Roman era |
| 5 | AB-I-s-B-00003 | Inhumation and cremation necropolis | Alba Iulia | "Podei", south of the Citadel, above the Orthodox cemetery | 2nd – 3rd century, Roman era |
| 6 | AB-I-s-B-00004 | Cemetery | Alba Iulia | "Sf. Mihail", located near Roman-Catholic Cathedral in Zone V | 11th — 15th century, Medieval era |
| 7 | AB-I-m-A-00005 | "Lumea Nouă" neolithic settlement | Alba Iulia | "Lumea Nouă", approx. 300m northeast of the Olympic pool | Neolithic |
| 8 | AB-I-s-B-00006 | Roman fortification | Abrud | "Cetățeaua" ("Citadel") | 2nd – 3rd century, Roman era |
| 9 | AB-I-s-B-0007 | Aiud archaeological site | Aiud | Entire territory | |
| 10 | AB-I-m-B-00007.01 | Settlement | Aiud | Entire territory | Latène culture. |
| 11 | AB-I-m-B-00007.02 | Settlement | Aiud | Micro-district III, approx. 100m south of the CFR Aiud train station | Hallstatt culture. |
| 12 | AB-I-m-B-00007.03 | Settlement | Aiud | Micro-district III, approx. 100m south of the CFR Aiud train station | Bronze Age, Wietenberg culture. |
| 13 | AB-I-m-B-00007.04 | Settlement | Aiud | Micro-district III, approx. 100m south of the CFR Aiud train station | Bronze Age, Coțofeni culture. |
| 14 | AB-I-m-B-00007.05 | Settlement | Aiud | Micro-district III, approx. 100m south of the CFR Aiud train station | Eneolithic era, Tiszapolgár culture. |
| 15 | AB-I-s-B-00008 | "Tinoasa" architectural site of Aiud | Aiud | "Tinoasa" or "Cetățuie" | |
| 16 | AB-I-s-B-00008.01 | Settlement | Aiud | "Tinoasa" or "Cetățuie", approx. 500m south-east of CFR area | 4th — 6th century, migration era |
| 17 | AB-I-s-B-00008.02 | Settlement | Aiud | "Tinoasa" or "Cetățuie", approx. 500m south-east of CFR area | 3rd — 4th century, Roman era |
| 18 | AB-I-s-B-00008.03 | Settlement | Aiud | "Tinoasa" or "Cetățuie", approx. 500m south-east of CFR area | Latène |
| 19 | AB-I-s-B-00008.04 | Settlement | Aiud | "Tinoasa" or "Cetățuie", approx. 500m south-east of CFR area | Hallstatt |
| 20 | AB-I-s-B-00008.05 | Settlement | Aiud | "Tinoasa" or "Cetățuie", approx. 500m south-east of CFR area | Neolithic |
| 21 | AB-I-s-B-00008.07 | Settlement | Aiud | "Tinoasa" or "Cetățuie", approx. 500m south-east of CFR area | Bronze Age |
| 22 | AB-I-s-B-00009 | Roman city Brucla | Aiud | Entire city, except for Aiudul de Sus (South Aiud) | 2nd — 3rd century, Roman era |
| 23 | AB-I-s-B-00010 | Settlement | Ampoița village, Meteș | "La Pietrii", approx. 1 km northwest of Alba Iulia-Zlatna intersection | Bronze Age |
| 24 | AB-I-s-B-00011 | Settlement | Ampoița village, Meteș | "Piata boului" or "Stogurile popii", approx. 1 km southeast of the village | Bronze Age |
| 25 | AB-I-s-B-00012 | Rustic village | Băcăinți village, Șibot | "Obreje" | Roman era |
| 26 | AB-I-s-B-00013 | Necropolis | Bărăbanț | "Tabla Grofului", near CFR railway towards Zlatna | Roman era |

=== Bucharest ===
- Tudor Arghezi House

=== Caraș-Severin County ===
- Reșița Steam Locomotive Museum

=== Cluj County ===
Matthias Corvinus Monument

=== Constanța County ===
- Constanța Casino
- Genoese Lighthouse

=== Giurgiu County ===
- Giurgiu Clocktower

=== Neamț County ===
- Ion Creangă House

=== Prahova County ===
- George Enescu House

=== Suceava County ===
- Vatra Dornei Casino

== See also ==
- National Register of Historic Monuments in Romania
- List of heritage registers
- List of museums in Romania
- List of castles in Romania
- List of religious buildings in Romania
- UNESCO World Heritage Sites in Romania
- List of ancient cities in Thrace and Dacia
- Romanian archaeology
- Archaeological cultures in Romania
- Archaeological sites in Romania
- Culture of Romania
