= George Enescu House =

Home of George Enescu, Romania

- Casa memorială George Enescu (Romanian)
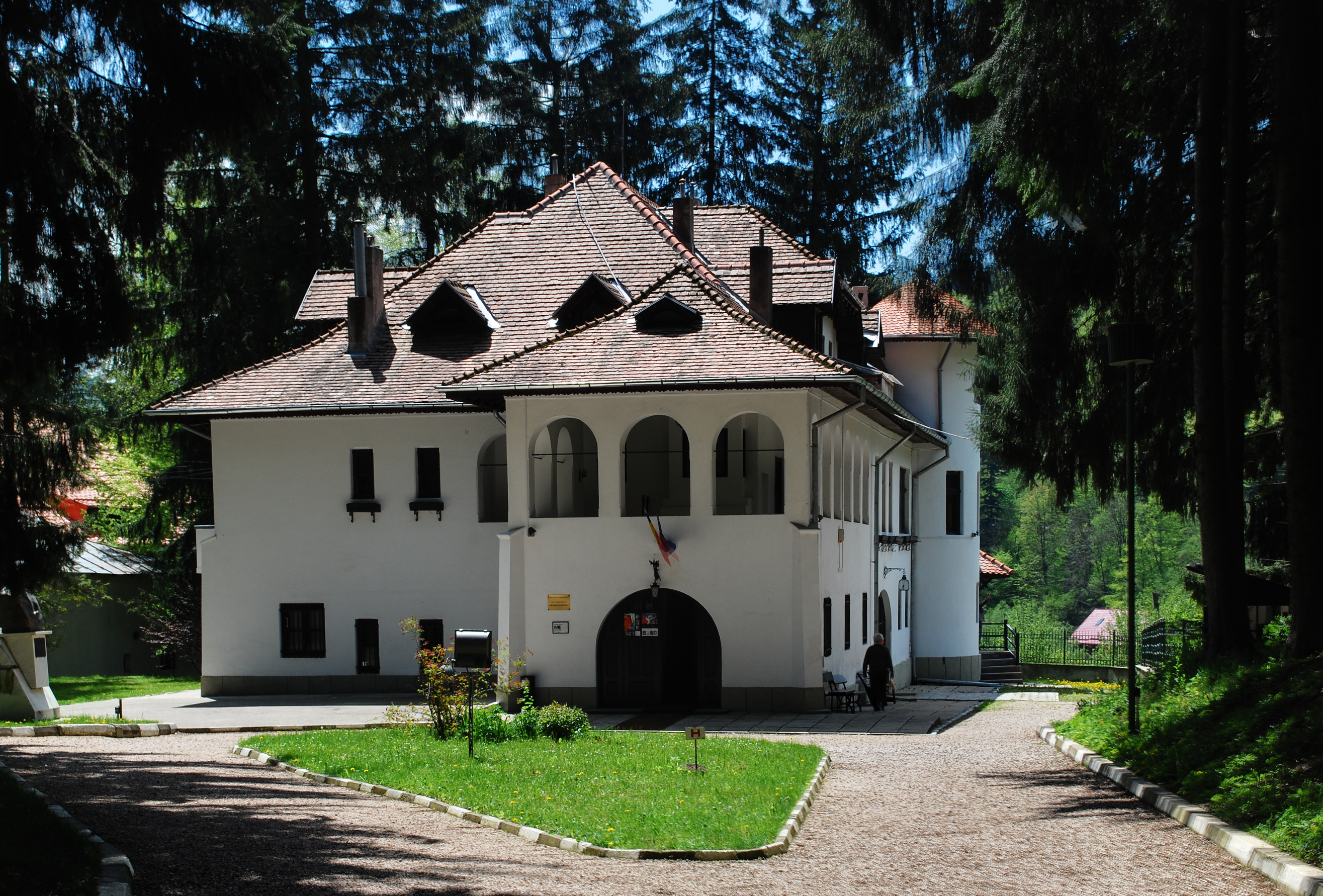
- Enescu's house
- Interactive map of George Enescu House
- 45.3669°N 25.5483°E
- Location: 2 Yehudi Menuhin Street, Sinaia, Romania

History
- Built: 1923–1926
- Built for: George Enescu

Site notes
- Architect: Radu Dudescu
- Architectural style: Romanian revival
- Governing body: Ministry of Culture and National Patrimony (Romania)
- Website: George Enescu Museum Website

Monument istoric
- Type: Architectural Monument of National Interest
- Designated: 1995
- Part of: National Register of Historic Monuments (Romanian: Lista Monumentelor Istorice (LMI))
- Reference no.: PH-II-m-A-16695

The Memorial House of George Enescu also known as Vila Luminiș is a Historic Monument located in Sinaia, Romania. The building was the home of Romanian composer George Enescu from 1926 until his emigration to Paris in 1946.

== History ==
The mansion was built between 1923 and 1926 in the Romanian revival architectural style and was designed by architect Radu Dudescu. The famous Romanian composer George Enescu lived and composed here from 1926 until he emigrated to Paris in 1946. Through an act of donation, he inherited the villa to the Romanian state to serve as a rest home for people of culture and art.

In this house, Enescu composed the Romanian Rhapsodies, quartet no. 1 for piano, violin sonatas, viola and cello no. 1 in D Major and part of the opera Oedipus. The composer's piano, an "Ibach" made in France in Lausanne, is still kept in the saloon.

Enescu's memorial house museum hosted in this villa was opened in September 1995, following the efforts of another master of the violin, Yehudi Menuhin, who was considered the best student of Enescu. It had been renovated and consolidated in the early 1990s, based on a project financially supported by the National Ministry of Culture and the European Cultural Center in Sinaia. Starting in 2007, it became a section of the "George Enescu" National Museum in Bucharest.

A marble bust of the George Enescu made by Romanian sculptor Ion Irimescu was placed at the entrance to the villa. The property is featured in the List of historical monuments in Prahova county at position number 789, at address "Aleea Menuhin Yehudi no. 2", Sinaia, with LMI code PH-II-m-A-16695.

== See also ==
- List of monumente istorice in Romania
