= Vasile Pârvan =

Romanian historian and archaeologist (1882–1927)

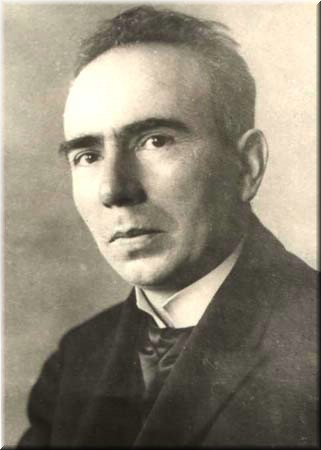
- Vasile Pârvan
- Born: 28 September 1882; Perchiu, Huruiești, Bacău County, Kingdom of Romania
- Died: 26 June 1927 (aged 44); Bucharest, Kingdom of Romania
- Resting place: Bellu Cemetery, Bucharest
- Citizenship: Romanian
- Education: University of Bucharest; University of Breslau
- Known for: Getica, research on Dacia
- Scientific career
- Fields: History, Archaeology
- Workplaces: Romanian Academy
- Thesis: The nationality of merchants in the Roman Empire (1908)
- Doctoral advisor: Conrad Cichorius

Vasile Pârvan (Romanian pronunciation: [vaˈsile pɨrˈvan]; 28 September 1882 – 26 June 1927) was a Romanian historian and archaeologist.

== Biography ==
Pârvan was born in Perchiu, Huruiești commune, Bacău County. He came from a modest family, being the first child of the teacher Andrei Pârvan (with ancestors from Bessarabia) and of Aristița Chiriac (from Dobrenii Neamțului). He received the first name Vasile, as well as his uncle, Vasile Conta (his mother being the philosopher's cousin).

In 1913 Pârvan married Silvia Cristescu, niece of Ioan Bogdan, his former teacher. During World War I, he took refuge in Iași (in 1916) and then in Odessa (in 1917), where his wife died in childbirth.

Passionate about the work on site, Pârvan ignored the appendicitis he suffered from. He finally arrived on the operating table, but it was too late to save his life; he died in Bucharest at age 45, in full creative power.

=== Education ===
He attended primary education in Berești and high school studies at the Gheorghe Roșca Codreanu National College in Bârlad (1893–1900). He then studied at the Faculty of Letters and Philosophy of the University of Bucharest (1900–1904), having as professors Nicolae Iorga, Ioan Bogdan, and Dimitrie Onciul.

In 1904 he left with a scholarship from the University of Bucharest (from the "Hillel Fund") on a troubled study trip to Germany, following the courses of three universities (Jena, Berlin, and Breslau) and often having financial problems and health issues. In Breslau he obtained the title of Doctor cum laudae, under the direction of Conrad Cichorius, with thesis The nationality of merchants in the Roman Empire (1908, in German), considered by specialists as one of the best studies on the development of trade in classical antiquity. German colleagues called him "the little Mommsen", which — given that the "great" Theodor Mommsen had recently been awarded (in 1902) the Nobel Prize for his monumental History of Ancient Rome — suggested the research interests of Pârvan. He became professor at the University of Bucharest, and was elected member of the Romanian Academy.

== Professional activity ==
=== Publishing activity ===
In 1900 he made his debut in journalism at the "Noua revistă română". From 1902 he started collaborating with "Convorbiri Literare" and in the following year with "Voința națională", "Tribuna Poporului", "Luceafărul" etc. In 1906 he joined as a "soldier of the right cause" in the Brotherhood of the Good Romanians (Frăția Bunilor Români) (organization created by Nicolae Iorga), starting to write for "Sămănătorul" and "Neamul Românesc". From 1907 he started the collaboration with "Viața Românească" and "Gazeta generală a învățământului".

=== Teaching and research activity ===
He was a professor at the University of Bucharest from 1909 (tenured since 1913), where he succeeded Grigore Tocilescu (immediately after his death). In 1910 he became a corresponding member of the Romanian Academy, and three years later, a full member. In 1919 he was appointed professor of ancient history at the University of Cluj. He has also been a member of several academies and scientific societies abroad; among others, he was an associate professor at the Sorbonne (from 1926) and a member of the International Committee of Historical Sciences (Geneva).

In order to solve the problems related to the history of Dacia, he organized a series of systematic excavations, especially in the archeological resorts from the second Iron Age. Based on the partial results of the excavations, Getica (1926) wrote – his most important work – a vast historical-archaeological synthesis, through which he brought to the forefront of historical research the political and cultural role of the Dacians; some shortcomings and exaggerations (including the emphasis on the role of the Scythians and Celts in the development of Geto-Dacian culture) do not detract from the value of this work.

He was particularly concerned with archeology, prehistory and the history of Greco-Roman civilization. He organized numerous archeological sites, the most important of which is the one in Histria and published numerous studies, archeological reports and monographs, including a vast, valuable and useful documentary material. He led the archeological site of Histria until 1926. Of the 12 years when Pârvan, as director of the National Museum of Antiquities, led the archaeological excavations in Histria, only during nine years (1914–1916; 1921–1926) normal campaigns took place.

The relatively small proportions of his work are explained by the intense organizational activity of this headmaster, and by the aridity and lack of information of the areas on which he focused his activity. Mircea Gheorghe notes:

" Getica was part of a projected trilogy that the great scientist failed to finish. This was to be followed by another work, Roman Dacia and then a third, Protohistory of the Slavs. Posthumously, the unfinished work Dacia. The ancient civilizations from the Carpatho-Danubian regions, which would have been part of the trilogy, if Vasile Pârvan had had time to develop it. [...] The fundamental objective of the trilogy was the analysis of the process of formation of the Romanian people through the Daco-Roman synthesis and through the assimilation of the Slavs and other allogens facing a strong rural Romanianness. His thesis was clear: the Romans took root through their agricultural occupations and formed a strong community, which the coming of other nations could not join".

His conception was that the only real object of history is culture, the spiritual life, the other aspects of life being useful insofar as it helps to understand the evolution of the human spirit. Through his idealistic historical conception, exposed in the sociological study The Fundamental Ideas of Contemporary Social Culture and in essays (volumes of Ideas and Historical Forms and Memorials) he managed to make a synthesis of neohegelianism and Neo-Kantianism and declared himself an opponent of chauvinism and cosmopolitanism. In "Parentalia", he wrote: "The man is, above all, the son of the Woman".

=== Representative works ===
- Stephen the Great's relations with Hungary (1905)
- M. Aurelius Verus Caesar and L. Aurelius Commodus (1909)
- Epigraphic contributions to the history of Daco-Roman Christianity (1911)
- Tropaeum Fortress (1912)
- Historical Ideas and Forms (1920)
- Memorial (1923)
- The beginnings of Roman life at the mouth of the Danube (1923)
- Getica. A protohistory of Dacia. (1926)
- Dacia: An Outline of the Early Civilization of the Carpatho-Danubian Countries (1928, in English, translated in Romanian as Dacia. Civilizațiile antice din regiunile carpato-danubiene 1937, 1957, 1958, and 1967, Editura Științifică)

=== Managerial activity ===
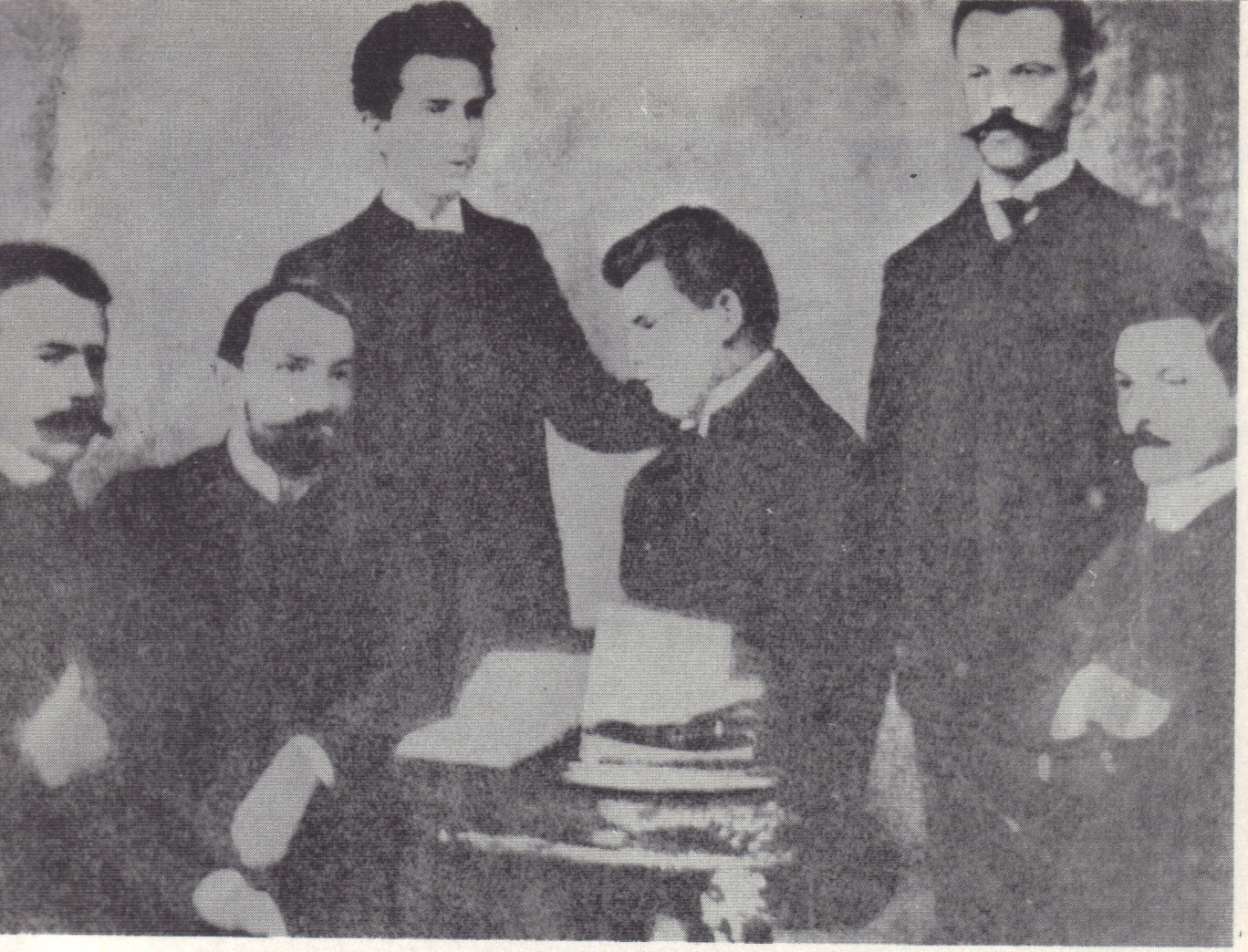
Ion Scurtu, Ilarie Chendi, Vasile Pârvan, Mihail Sadoveanu, Alexandru I. Lapedatu and Ștefan Octavian Iosif (from left to right)

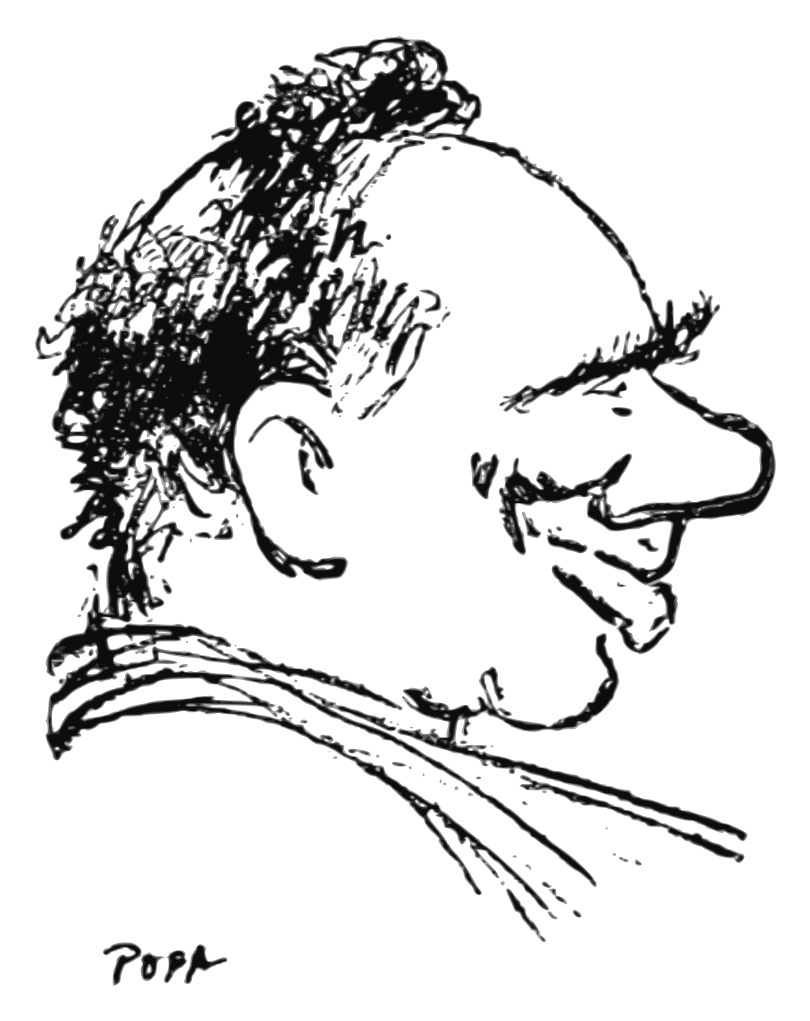
Vasile Pârvan as seen by Victor Ion Popa. In fact, the two posthumously "share" the building of the theater/museum in Bârlad.

Between 1910 and 1926 he was director of the National Museum of Antiquities. In 1919 he founded the Institute of Antiquities in Cluj, and a year later the publishing house "Cultura națională", where he cared for several collections.

He was vice-president of the Romanian Academy (1921–1922), and from 1923 he worked as general secretary until his death in 1927.

Vasile Pârvan had a special role in the creation of the new Romanian school of archeology. Thus, in 1914 he was one of the founders of the Institute of Southeast European Studies. He later organized (1921) the Romanian Academy in Rome, an institution of which he was director until his death. The purpose of this institution was the refreshing trainings the young archaeologists and historians; also in this institution he initiated and led the publication of the yearbooks "Ephemeris Dacoromana" and "Diplomatarium Italicum", as well as the first series of the magazine "Dacia".

He contributed to the formation of the historians Hortensia Dumitrescu, Vladimir Dumitrescu, Ecaterina Dunăreanu Vulpe, Ion Nestor, Dionisie M. Pippidi, Dorin Popescu, Gheorghe Ștefan, and Radu Vulpe, who continued his activity.

== Echoes ==
The scientist Nicolae Iorga wrote:

"No one will be found to unite the gifts gathered in the one who so quickly leaves a glorious career: archaeological and historical knowledge of immense wealth, an endless zeal with the most systematic work, care for the smallest detail, with of the audacity of the highest hypothesis. All of them made him an archaeologist looked as equal to anyone in the most cultured abode."

In turn, George Călinescu noted:

"Neither Pârvan's style, nor his preoccupation are to be imitated, they being the unique and non-reproducible personal elements; but the form of his action, that religion of construction, that ferocity of the thought which does not give way ... heroic determination, a noble longing for the monument, for the permanent expression and rehabilitation of the genius, which is a Michelangelo dome, over high and thick walls of toil and meditation."

== In memoriam ==
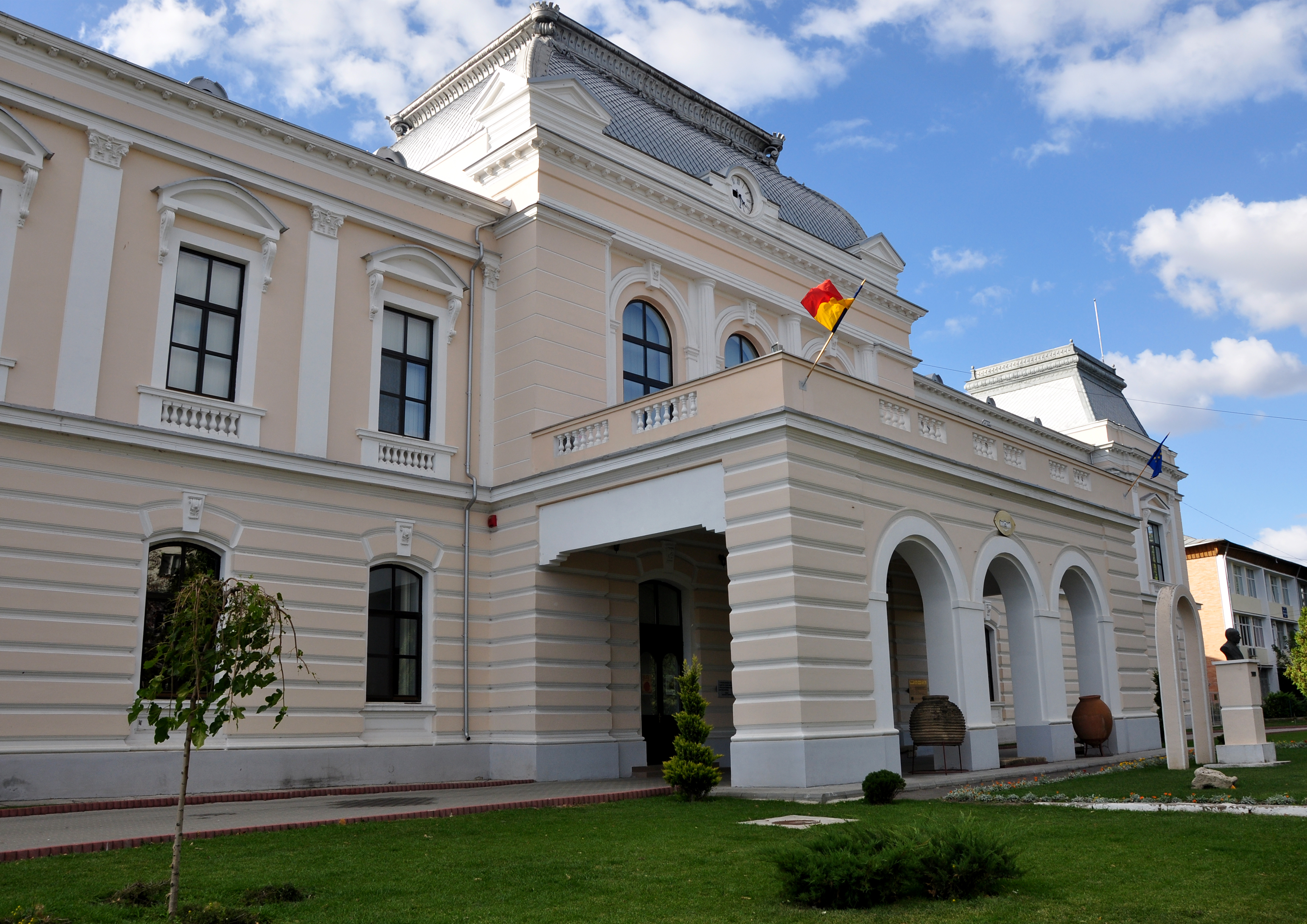
The façade of the County Museum "Vasile Pârvan" from Bârlad. At the main entrance is the bust of the scientist

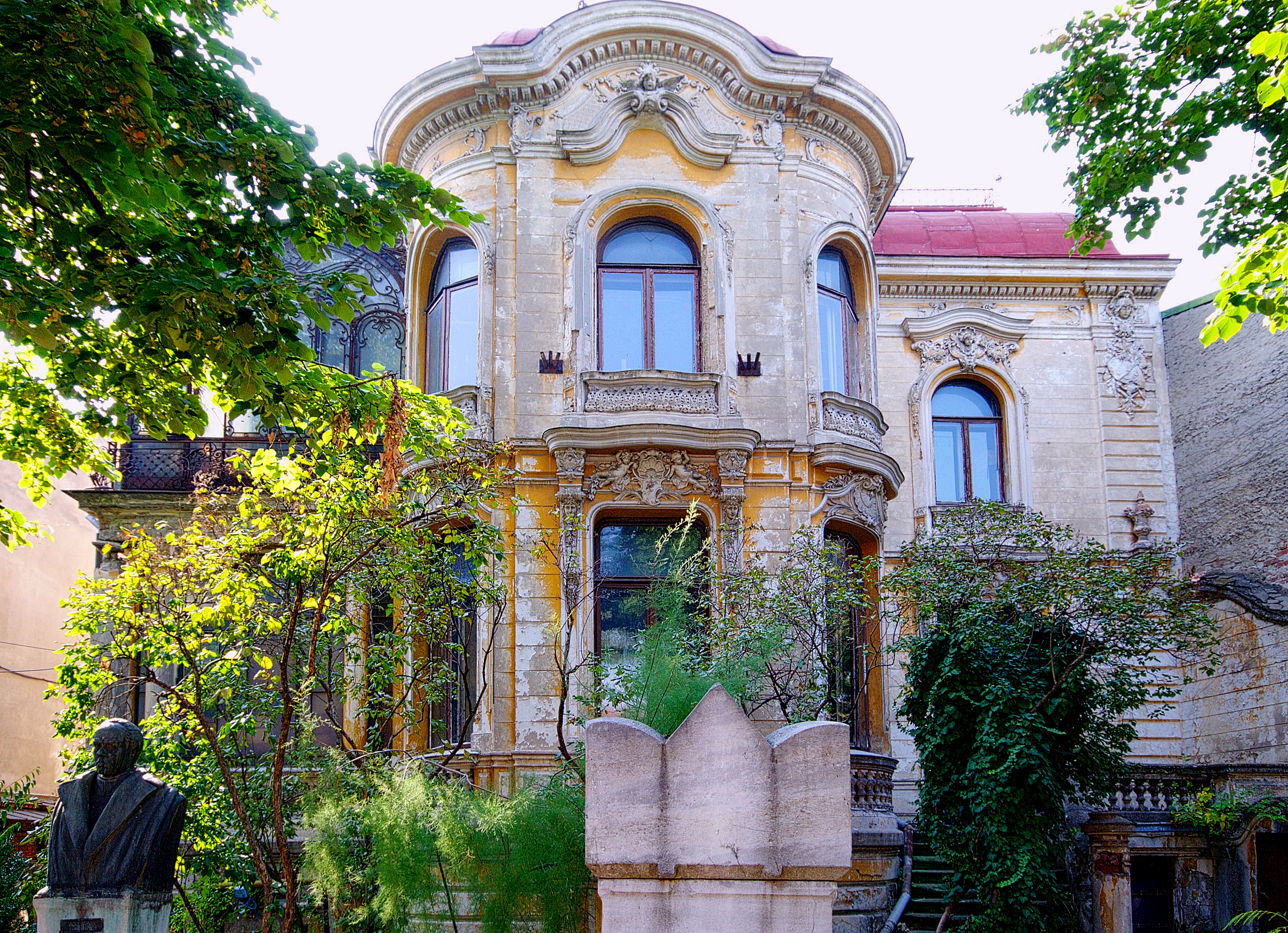
Façade of the "Vasile Pârvan" Institute of Archeology (Macca house) in Bucharest. The bust of the scientist is placed in the yard

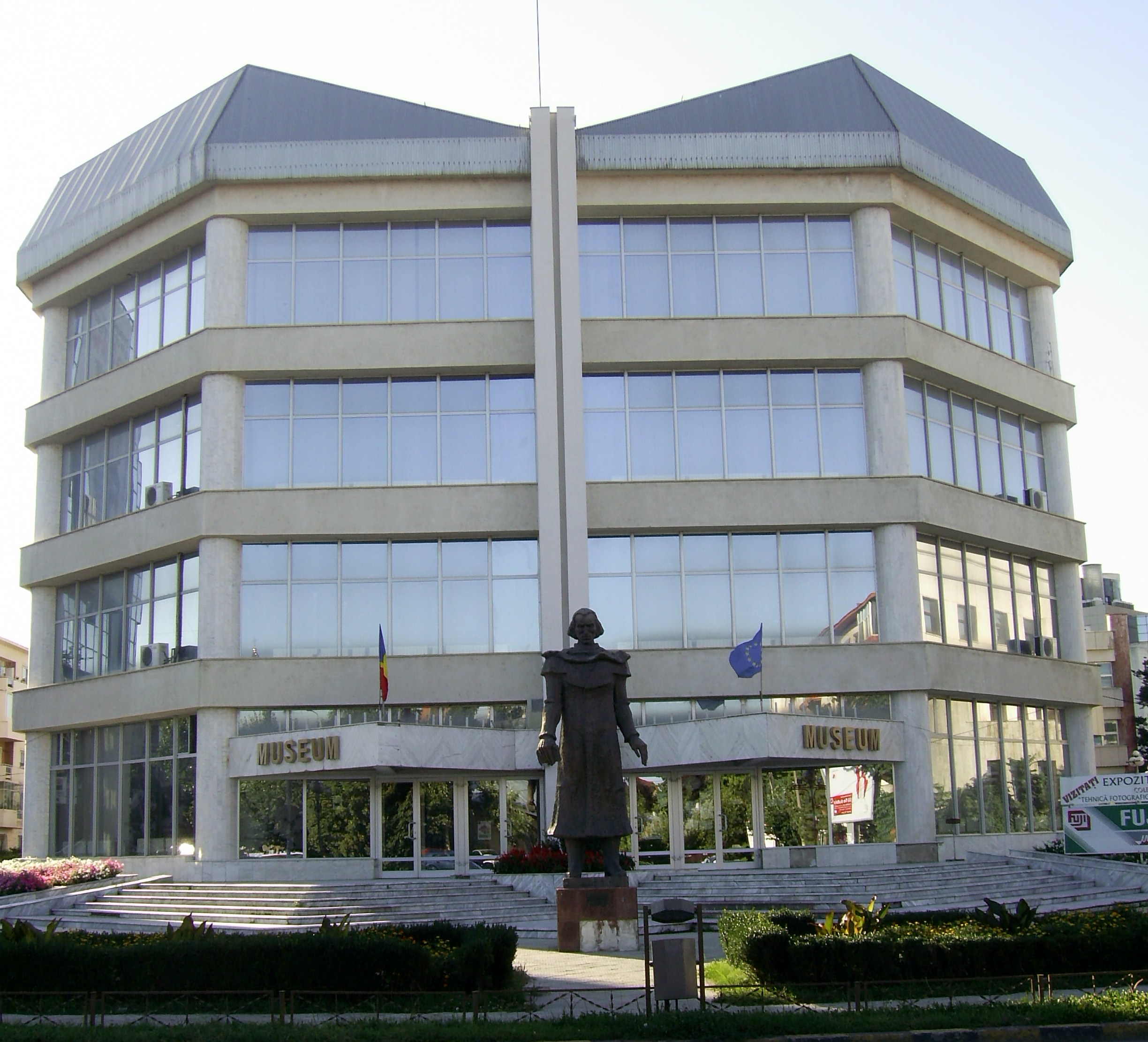
The statue in front of the "Iulian Antonescu" Museum Complex in Bacău

- The Institute of Archeology in Bucharest and the County Museum in Bârlad were named in honor of the scientist, in recognition of his merits in the field.
- The "Vasile Pârvan" memorial house in Perchiu village is closed and is in an advanced state of degradation.
- One of the annual awards of the Department of Historical Sciences and Archeology of the Romanian Academy is named in his honor.
- The "Vasile Pârvan" postgraduate and postdoctoral research and training scholarships at the Romanian Academy in Rome, were established by Government Decision no. 101/2002, amended and supplemented by Government Decision no. 918/2011.
- The "Vasile Pârvan" National Symposium is organized annually by the "Iulian Antonescu" Museum Complex in Bacău, in partnership with the Bacău National Archives.
- His figure appears on a stamp of 1962 (with a face value of 35 bani) and on a postcard in 1963.
- Nichita Stănescu dedicated to him the second elegy, Getica.
- Several schools (for example in Bârlad) and high schools (for example in Constanța and in Gotești, Moldova), streets and boulevards (for example in Bucharest, Tecuci, Timișoara, etc.), squares (for example in Suceava), amphitheaters (University of Bucharest) are named after the great scientist.
- He is buried at Bellu Cemetery in Bucharest.
- The bust of Vasile Pârvan from Constanța.
- The statue of the historian Vasile Pârvan made by the sculptors Geta Caragiu and Alexandru Gheorghiță, located in front of the County Museum of History in Bacău.

== See also ==
- Dacia
- List of Romanian archaeologists
