= Alexander Rubel =

German historian of Graeco-Roman history (born 1969)

- Born: December 27, 1969 (age 56)
- Occupation: Historian

Alexander Rubel (b. 27 December 1969) is a German-Romanian historian of the Antiquity.

Alexander Rubel studied History, Germanistics and Philosophy at the University of Konstanz. He was a researcher at the Department of Ancient History of the University of Konstanz. In 2000 he relocated to Iași, Romania, as Director of the Iași branch of the Goethe-Institut. He became a DAAD lecturer at the Alexandru Ioan Cuza University. He is presently the director of the German Cultural Center in Iași., researcher at and Director of the Iași Institute of Archaeology.

== Selected works ==
- Stadt in Angst. Religion und Politik in Athen während des Peloponnesischen Krieges, Wissenschaftliche Buchgesellschaft, Darmstadt 2000, ISBN 3-534-15206-9
- Rumänien in Europa. Geschichte, Kultur, Politik, Hartung-Gorre & Editura Univ. „Alexandru Ioan Cuza“, Konstanz-Iași 2002, ISBN 3-89649-771-5 und ISBN 973-8243-42-4
- With Cătălin Turliuc: Totalitarism. Ideologie şi realitate socială în România şi RDG = Totalitarismus, Editura Univ. „Alexandru Ioan Cuza“, Iași 2006, ISBN 978-973-703-141-9 und ISBN 973-703-141-5
- With Andrei Corbea-Hoişie: „Czernowitz bei Sadagora“. Identitäten und kulturelles Gedächtnis im mitteleuropäischen Raum, Hartung-Gorre & Editura Univ. „Alexandru Ioan Cuza“, Konstanz-Iași 2006, ISBN 978-3-86628-070-0, ISBN 3-86628-070-X, ISBN 978-973-703-175-4 and ISBN 973-703-175-X
- Friedrich Schiller zwischen Historisierung und Aktualisierung. Akten eines Kolloquiums in Jassy anlässlich des 250. Geburtstags des Dichters am 10. November 2009, Hartung-Gorre & Editura Univ. „Alexandru Ioan Cuza“, Konstanz und Iași 2011, ISBN 978-3-86628-344-2 und ISBN 978-973-703-598-1
- Die Griechen. Kultur und Geschichte in klassischer und archaischer Zeit, Marix Verlag, Wiesbaden 2012, ISBN 978-3-86539-964-9
- With Iulia Dumitrache, Imperium und Romanisierung. Neue Forschungsansätze aus Ost und West zu Ausübung, Transformation und Akzeptanz von Herrschaft im Römischen Reich', Konstanz, Hartung-Gorre Verlag 2013, ISBN 978-3-86628-467-8
- Fear and Loathing in Ancient Athens. Religion and Politics during the Peloponnesian War, Durham, Acumen Publishing 2014, ISBN 978-1-84465-570-0
- Religion und Kult der Germanen, Kohlhammer Verlag, Stuttgart 2015, ISBN 978-3-17-029266-6
