= Nicolae Iorga Institute of History =

Coordinates: 44°27′20″N 26°05′07″E

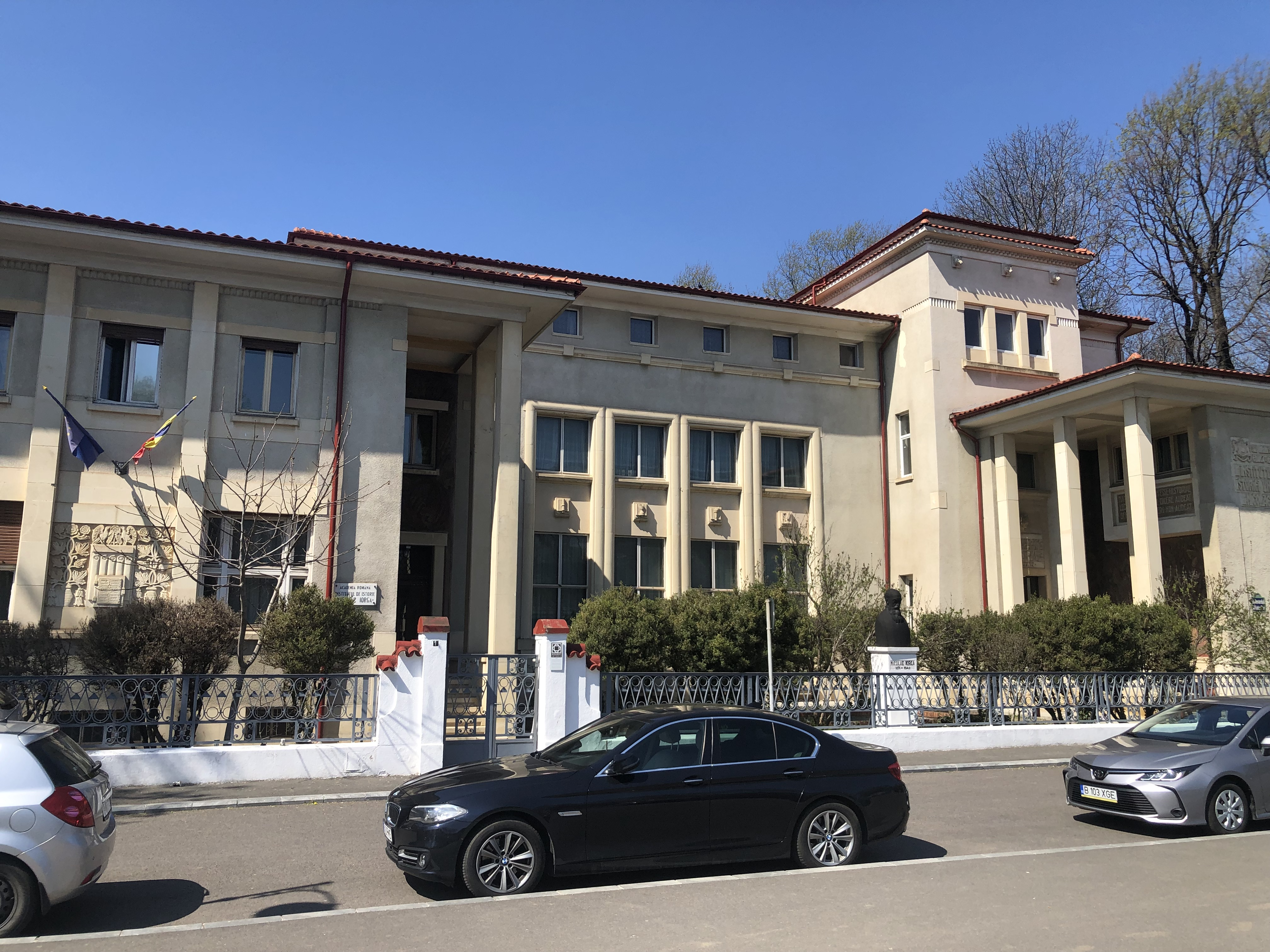
The Nicolae Iorga Institute of History in Bucharest

The Nicolae Iorga Institute of History (Romanian: Institutul de Istorie „Nicolae Iorga”; abbreviation: IINI) is an institution of research in the field of history under the auspices of the Romanian Academy. The institute is located at 1 Bulevardul Aviatorilor in Sector 1 of Bucharest, Romania.

== History ==
Founded on 1 April 1937 by Romanian historian and its first director, Nicolae Iorga, it was first named the Institute for the Study of Universal History. In 1948, it was renamed the History Institute of the Romanian People's Republic; it acquired the present name in 1965.

The building, inaugurated on 16 December 1939, was designed by architect Petre Antonescu, with frescoes painted by Olga Greceanu.

== Directors of the institute ==
- Nicolae Iorga (1937–1940)
- Gheorghe I. Brătianu (1940–1947)
- Andrei Oțetea (1947–1948)
- Petre Constantinescu-Iași (1948–1953)
- Victor Cheresteșiu (1953–1956)
- Andrei Oțetea (1956–1970)
- Ștefan Ștefănescu (1970–1989)
- Șerban Papacostea (1990–2001)
- Ioan Scurtu (2001–2006)
- Eugen Denize (2006–2007)
- Ovidiu Cristea (2007–2023)
- Mioara Anton (2023–present)

== See also ==
- Romanian Academy
- Vasile Pârvan Institute of Archaeology
- Iași Institute of Archaeology
