= Alexandru Vulpe =

Romanian historian and archaeologist (1931–2016)

- Born: Alexandru Vulpe; June 16, 1931; Bucharest, Kingdom of Romania
- Died: February 9, 2016 (aged 84); Bucharest, Romania
- Occupations: Historian; archaeologist
- Awards: Order of the Star of Romania, Commander rank

Academic background
- Education: University of Bucharest
- Thesis: Necropola hallstattiană de la Ferigile: Monografie arheologică (1968)
- Doctoral advisor: Ion Nestor

Alexandru Vulpe (June 16, 1931 – February 9, 2016) was a Romanian historian and archaeologist, member of the Romanian Academy and director of the Vasile Pârvan Institute of Archaeology.

== Life ==
Vulpe was born in 1931 in Bucharest, the son of archaeologists Radu Vulpe and Ecaterina Dunăreanu-Vulpe. He graduated from the Faculty of History of the University of Bucharest in 1954, where he studied ancient history and classical philology.

In 1965, he became a scientific researcher at the Vasile Pârvan Institute of Archaeology, and in 1968 earned his doctorate in history for Necropola hallstattiană de la Ferigile: Monografie arheologică (The Hallstattian necropolis of Ferigile: Archaeological monograph), supervised by Ion Nestor. Beginning in 1976, Vulpe was correspondent member of the German Archaeological Institute and member of the permanent council of the International Union for Prehistoric and Protohistoric Sciences (IUPPS).

In 2000, Vulpe was made a commander of the Order of the Star of Romania. In 2009, he was elected a titular member of the Romanian Academy.
