= Archaeological looting in Romania =

Archaeological looting in Romania refers to illegal digging and removal of ancient artifacts from archaeological sites in Romania in order to be sold on the black market of antiquities in Western Europe and the United States.

Notable among the treasure looted are two dozen Dacian bracelets which were dug up and stolen around 1999–2001 from the archeological site at Sarmizegetusa Regia. Twelve of which were recovered by the Romanian state and at least another twelve are still missing.

== Looting groups ==
In Romania, unauthorized digs are illegal around the areas designated archeological sites. Some looters use flocks of sheep in order to justify their presence in the area: they camp near the archeological sites and use donkeys to carry their equipment.

In 2009, twelve looters (among which Iulian Ceia) were convicted to between 7 and 12 years in jail for looting Dacian bracelets and selling them on the international black market; they have however appealed and the trial is still ongoing.

In 2012, four looters (Liviu Darius Baci, Mircea Mihăilă, Florin Sebastian Zvîncă, Romică Hîndorean) were sent to trial for looting from Sarmizegetusa Regia between 1998 and 2009. They looted 3,600 Greek coins (estimated at €3,794,550), a necklace (estimated at €100,000) and 35 Roman denarii (from Dâncu Mare).

== Artifacts looted ==
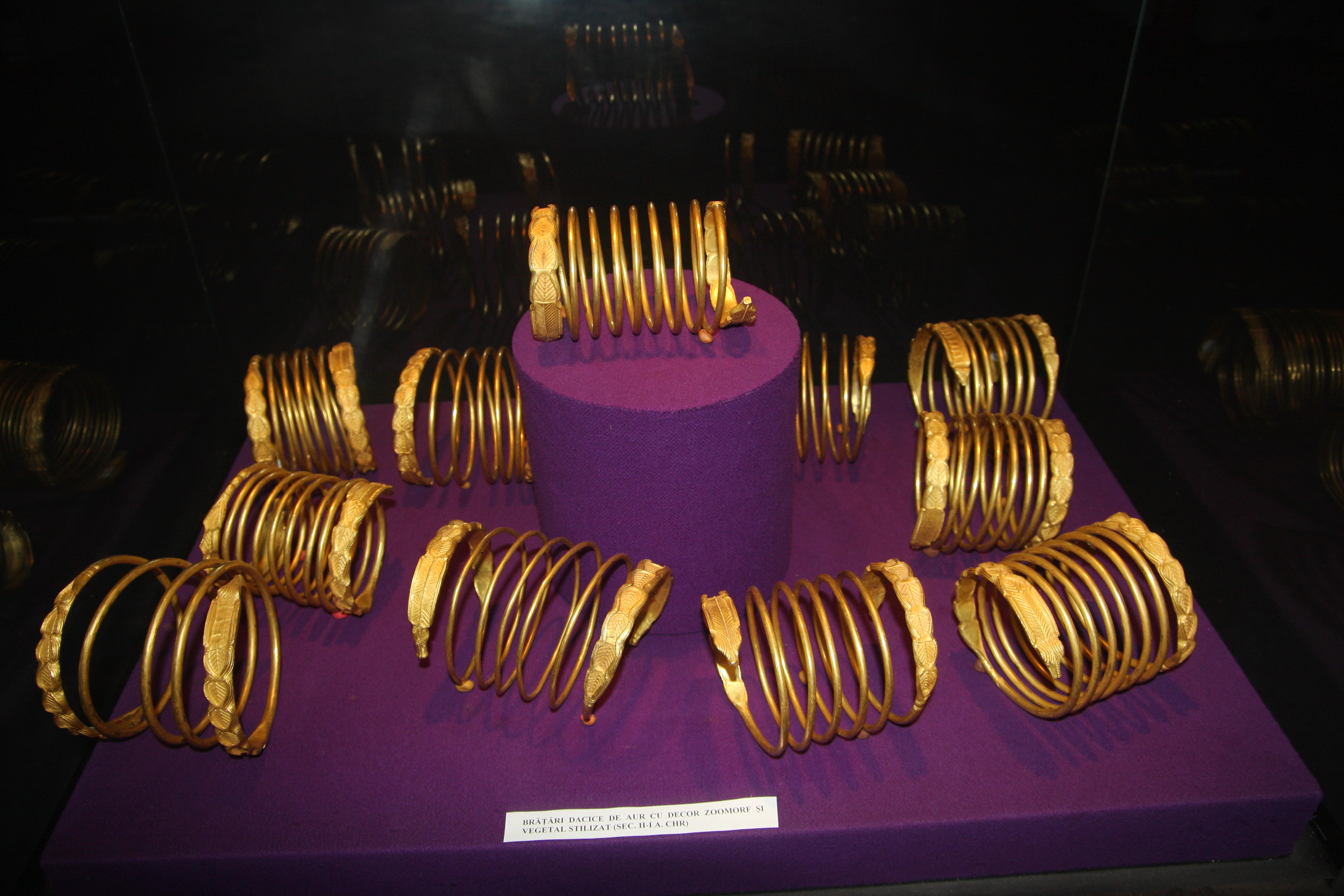
Dacian Gold Bracelets at the National History Museum of Romania

=== Dacian bracelets ===
The golden bracelets, weighing between 800 and 1200 grams each, were discovered by looters in the Sarmizegetusa Regia Dacian fortress (a UNESCO World Heritage Site) in the Orăștie Mountains and they were illegally exported. They were recovered by the Romanian authorities from the international market through a collaboration with the German authorities.

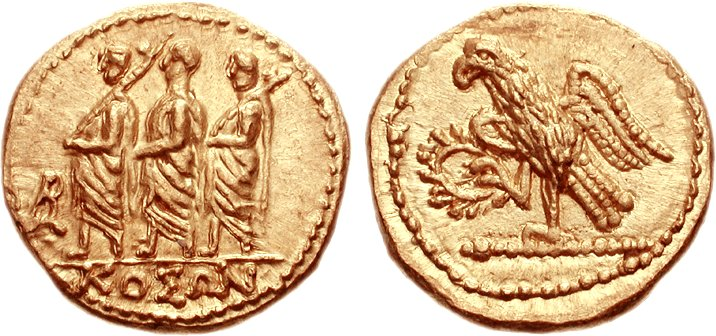
A Koson Dacian coin

=== Dacian coins ===
Following the looting, gold Koson coins have been dispersed around the world, being sold at coin auctions. The Romanian police began an international investigation which resulted in seizures in Hamburg and London (2010) and Dublin (2011), the source of the two coins seized in the Dublin auction being a New York auction. Such coins have an estimated value of €800 each. The Romanian authorities have so far, recovered 700 gold Kosons and 202 silver Kosons.

A treasure containing 3,600 Greek coins (bearing the names of Lysimachus, Pharnakes and Asander) weighing 30 kg (66 lb) was looted in August 1998 from the Șesu Căprăreței site in Sarmizegetusa Regia. It was taken illegally out of the country and sold on the Triton III auction (November/December 1999) in the United States.

The Romanian authorities recovered only 28 Lysimachus coins.

On 21 May 2013, three Lysimachus coins minted on Tomis and Callatis were recovered from looters among other Roman and medieval coins.

=== Other artifacts ===
In 2009, the Romanian authorities recovered from Germany an ancient golden necklace with pendants that has been looted around 2002–2003 from the archeological site of Dacian fortress of Căpâlna. The authorities also recovered three royal Dacian iron shields.
