= Dacian =

Dacian may refer to:

== Relating to "Dacia" ==
- of or relating to Dacia in southeastern Europe
  - Dacians, the ancient Indo-European inhabitants of the cultural region of Dacia
  - Dacian language
- of or relating to one of the other meanings of Dacia

== Given name ==
- Dacian or Dacianus, 4th-century Roman prefect who persecuted Christians
- Dacian Cioloș (born 1969), Romanian agronomist, politician and former prime minister
- Dacian Varga (born 1984), Romanian footballer
