= Petre Antonescu =

Romanian architect (1873–1965)

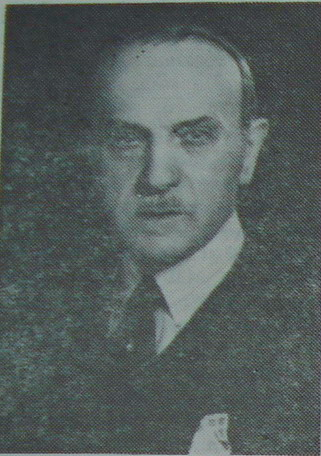
Petre Antonescu

Petre Antonescu (June 29, 1873 – April 22, 1965) was a Romanian architect. Over the course of a career that spanned the first half of the 20th century, he established himself as a leader in the field within his country, helping define a national style of neo-Romanian architecture.

== Biography ==
Born in Râmnicu Sărat, he completed high school in Bucharest and entered the law faculty of the University of Bucharest. While there, he became close to important artists who were then grappling with the problem of how to define a specific Romanian art. By 1893, his new passion led Antonescu to abandon law and head to Paris to study architecture. In 1899, he obtained a degree in the field from the École des Beaux-Arts. He obtained six medals while a student and drafted the plan for a Romanian pavilion at the 1900 Exposition Universelle.

In 1900, Antonescu was made honorific professor at Bucharest's School of Architecture, rising to full professor in 1903. He taught the history of architecture from 1900 to 1938, and was the school's rector from 1931 to 1938. According to a former student, he drew beautifully and spoke in short, clear, carefully chosen phrases. Antonescu was active in the realm of conserving and restoring historic monuments, participating in numerous projects during the interwar period. Together with Gheorghe Balș and Nicolae Ghica-Budești, he formed part of the historic monuments committee, helping create a scientific template for restorations.

In 1912 and again from 1919 to 1921, Antonescu was president of the Romanian Architects' Society; he also led the Society of Professional Architects from 1926 to 1932. Elected an honorary member of the Romanian Academy in 1936, he was raised to titular status in 1945. In 1948, the new communist regime stripped him of Academy membership. He was granted the State Prize in 1952 for rebuilding and expanding the Bucharest City Hall, and in 1958 was awarded the Order of the Star of the Romanian People's Republic, first class. In 1927, he was made a corresponding member of the Accademia di San Luca in Rome.

== Achievements ==
Sinaia Casino, designed by Antonescu

Together with his predecessor Ion Mincu, Antonescu helped define the existence of a national style in Romanian architecture, becoming a dominant force in the field during the first half of the 20th century. His most representative works are in Bucharest: the City Hall, the Marmorosch‐Blank Bank Palace, the Brătianu complex, the Oprea Soare House, the Law Faculty Palace, the Student's Culture House, the Crețulescu Palace, the Politehnica Society Palace (today the General Association of Romanian Engineers' headquarters), the Nicolae Iorga Institute of History, and Arcul de Triumf. Other works include the Craiova Administrative Palace, the Galați Orthodox Cathedral (together with Ștefan Burcuș), the Sinaia Casino and Hotel Palace, and the Palaces of Justice in Botoșani and Buzău.

Passionate about architecture, Antonescu designed over forty projects, most of which are historic monuments today. A student of Julien Guadet and a disciple of Mincu's, he helped shape the classical form of the national style. He sought and discovered valuable old monuments, recalling them in collections of sketches, watercolors and studies. Like Mincu, he believed that the past creations of Romanians could serve as a vast reservoir of inspiration, and drew on this as his main professional preoccupation. While training under Guadet and Edmond Paulin, he began his career in the classically oriented academicism prevailing at their school, designing several important works in this spirit. Near the end of his life, Antonescu divided his own work into classical and Romanian architecture. He was the first to apply the neo-Romanian style at a monumental scale, for multilevel buildings with complex functions, defining his efforts as the start of a "local original style".

The first book in which Antonescu presented his work was the 1913 Clădiri. Studii. Case. Biserici. Monumente. Palate. Încercări de arhitectură românească și clasică. His monumental 1963 Clădiri, construcții, proiecte și studii is an ample presentation of his architectural record. Renașterea Arhitecturii Românești. Stilul Regele Carol al II‐lea appeared in 1939, under the National Renaissance Front regime. In Biserici nouă – proiecte și schițe (1942, re-edited 1943), he presented theories on the history of church architecture and the foundations of the Byzantine style.
