= Dacicus (disambiguation) =

Dacicus is a Latin word for "Dacian". It may also mean one of the following:

- Dacicus, a Roman gold coin
- CSM Dacia Orăștie, a Romanian football team that used to be named "CS Dacicus Orăștie"
- Murus Dacicus, Dacian defensive wall construction method
- Ludus Dacicus, an ancient Roman gladiator training school
- A specific epithet used in biology for some species found in Romania:
  - Allogamus dacicus: a caddis-fly in the Stenophylacini
  - Centromerus dacicus
  - Hercostomus dacicus
  - Hyloniscus dacicus
  - Lithobius dacicus
  - Temnostethus dacicus
- Dacicus or Dacicus Maximus, Roman victory titles used by some Roman emperors

== See also ==
- Dacia (disambiguation)
