= Dacia (Pârvan) =

Dacia: An Outline of the Early Civilization of the Carpatho-Danubian Countries
- Author: Vasile Pârvan
- Language: English
- Genre: History
- Publisher: The University Press
- Publication date: 1928

Dacia: An Outline of the Early Civilization of the Carpatho-Danubian Countries is a history book by the Romanian historian and archaeologist Vasile Pârvan (1882–1927). The book, published post-mortem in 1928, resulted from a series of lectures that Pârvan gave at Cambridge University. Similar to his major work, Getica (1926), Dacia covers the ancient history of Carpatho-Danubian region. In both books, Pârvan presented Dacia as a great kingdom with a homogeneous ethnic base, an advanced civilization, and a well-defined political and national identity.

== See also ==
- Dacia
- Vasile Pârvan
