= Archaeology Museum Piatra Neamț =

Archeology museum in Piatra Neamț, Romania

Coordinates: 46°55′41″N 26°22′10″E

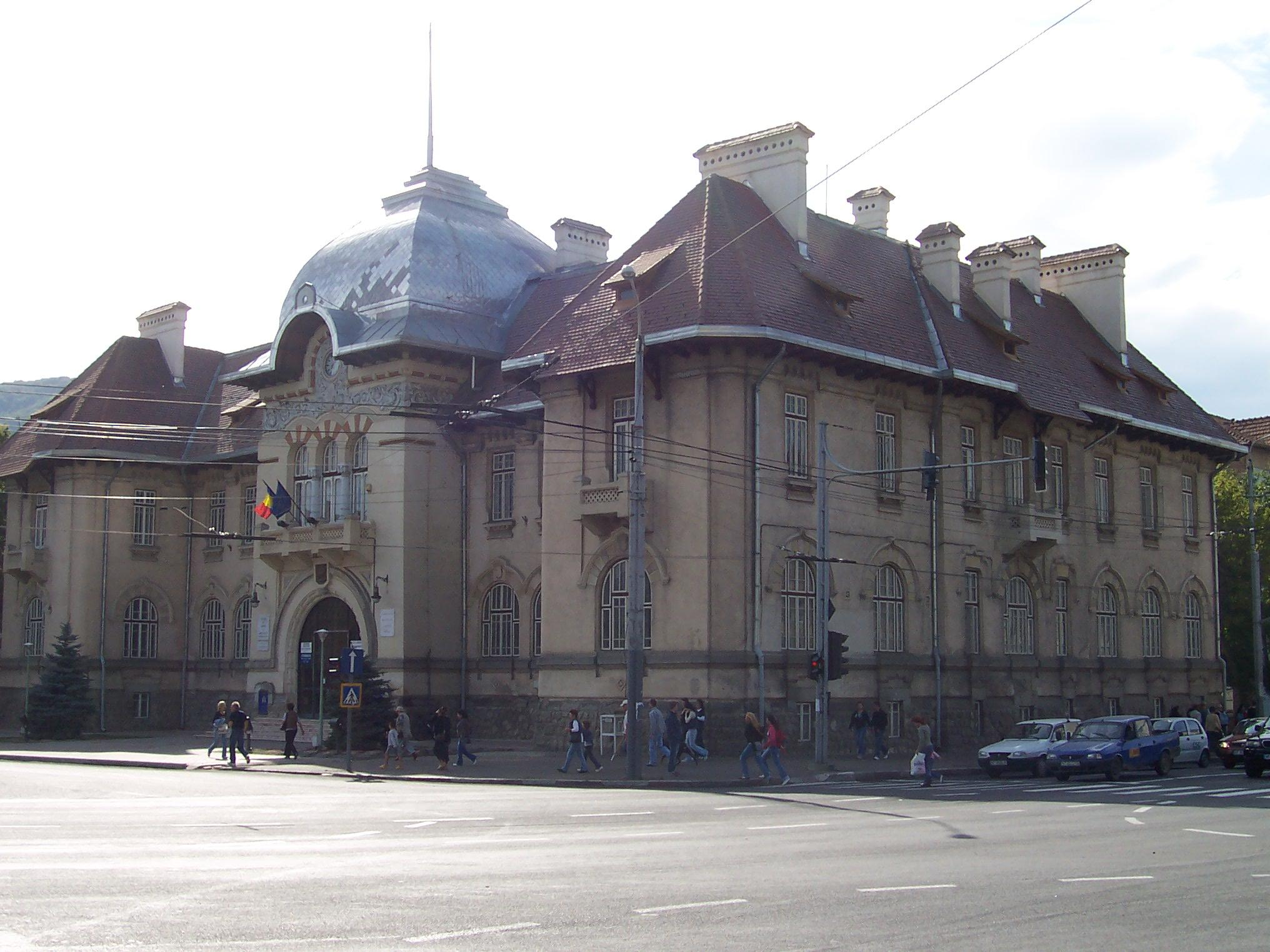
Muzeul de Istorie și Arheologie

The History & Archaeology Museum in Piatra Neamț, Romania, was founded at the beginning of the 20th century by Constantin Matasă, a minister and amateur archaeologist.

The museum houses the most important collection of Cucuteni culture artifacts and it is the home of the Cucuteni Research Centre. The famous piece, Hora de la Frumuşica ("The Frumuşica Dance," the symbol of Cucuteni culture), can be found on the museum website.

== Gallery ==
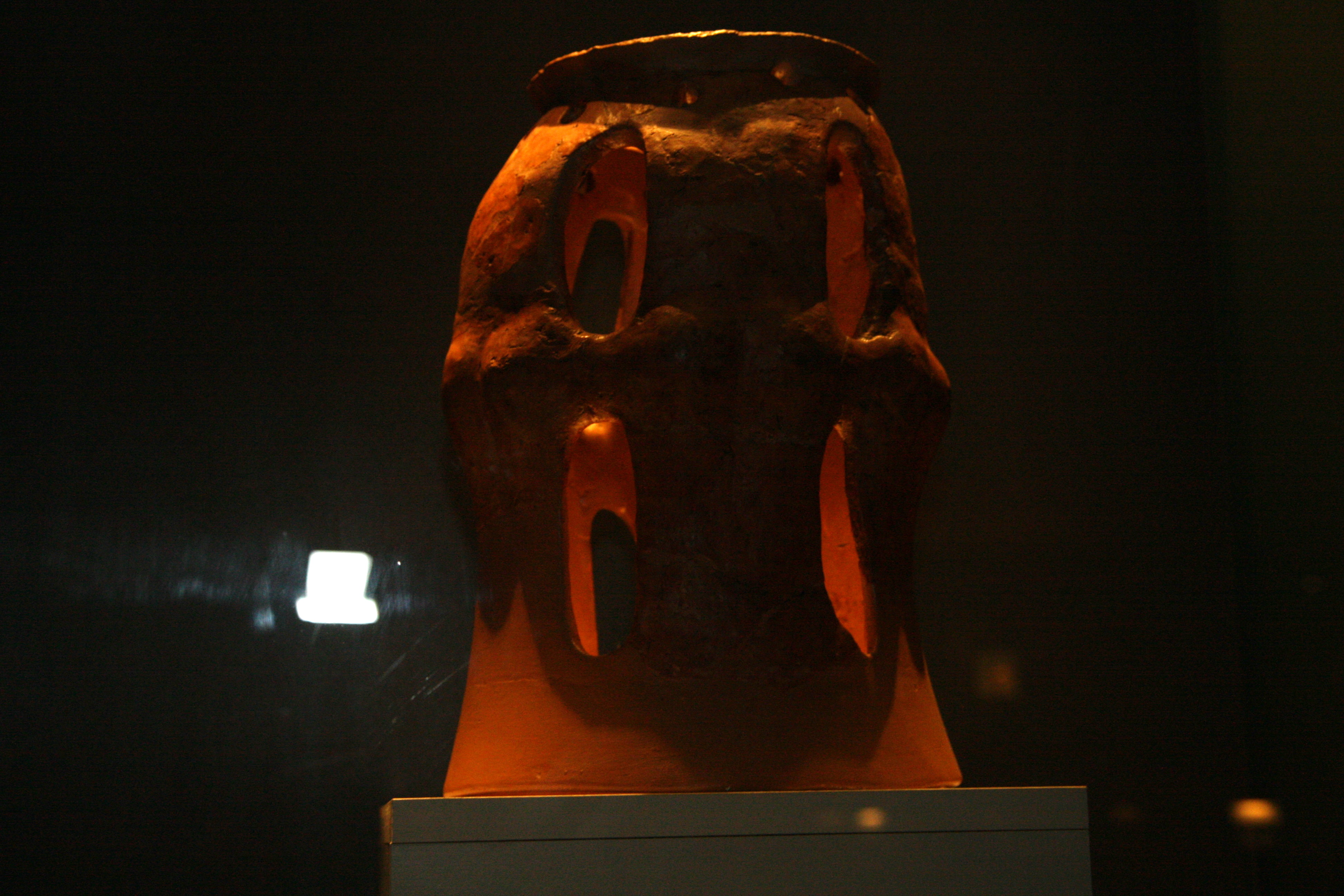
The Frumușica Dance

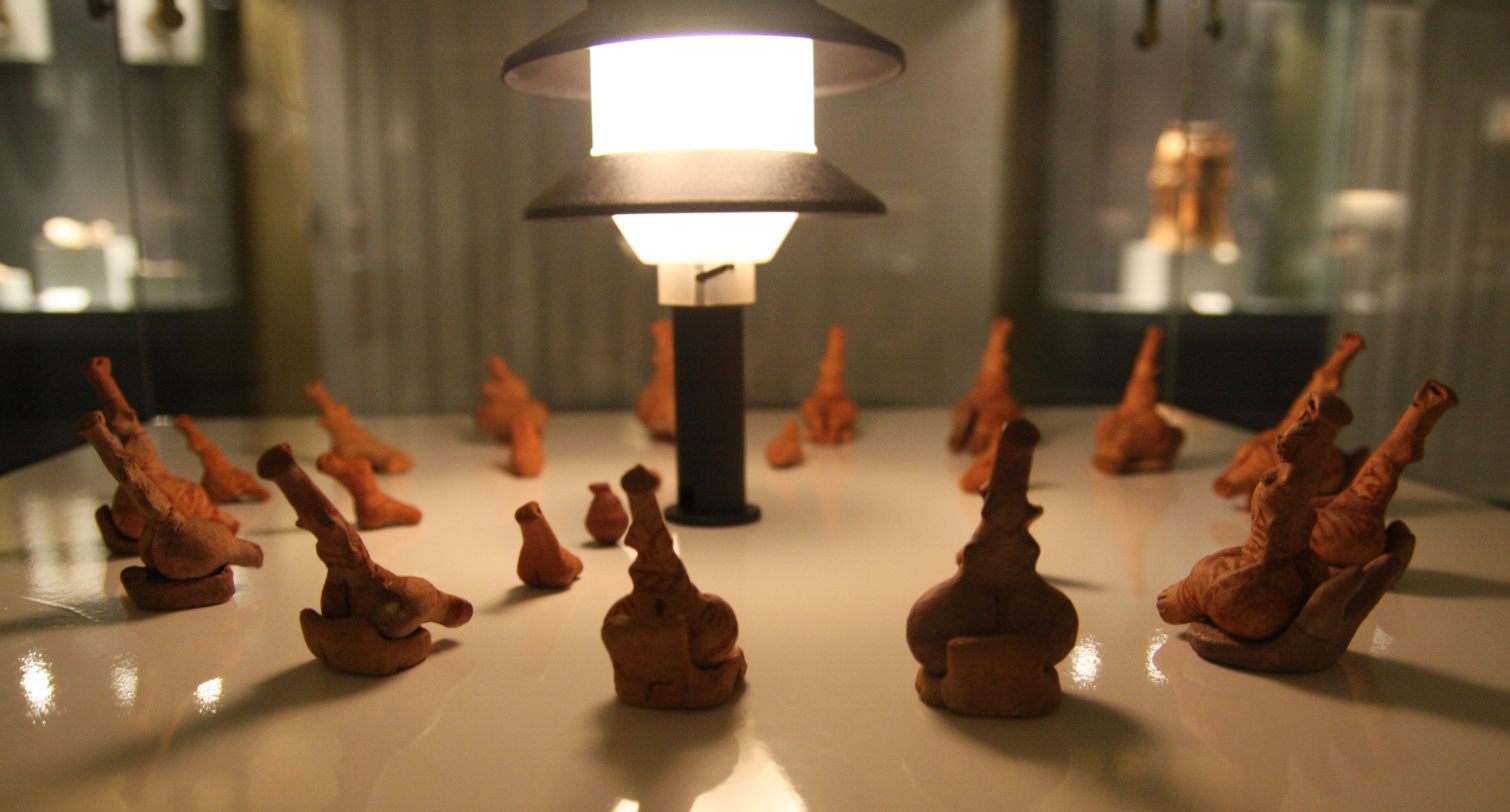

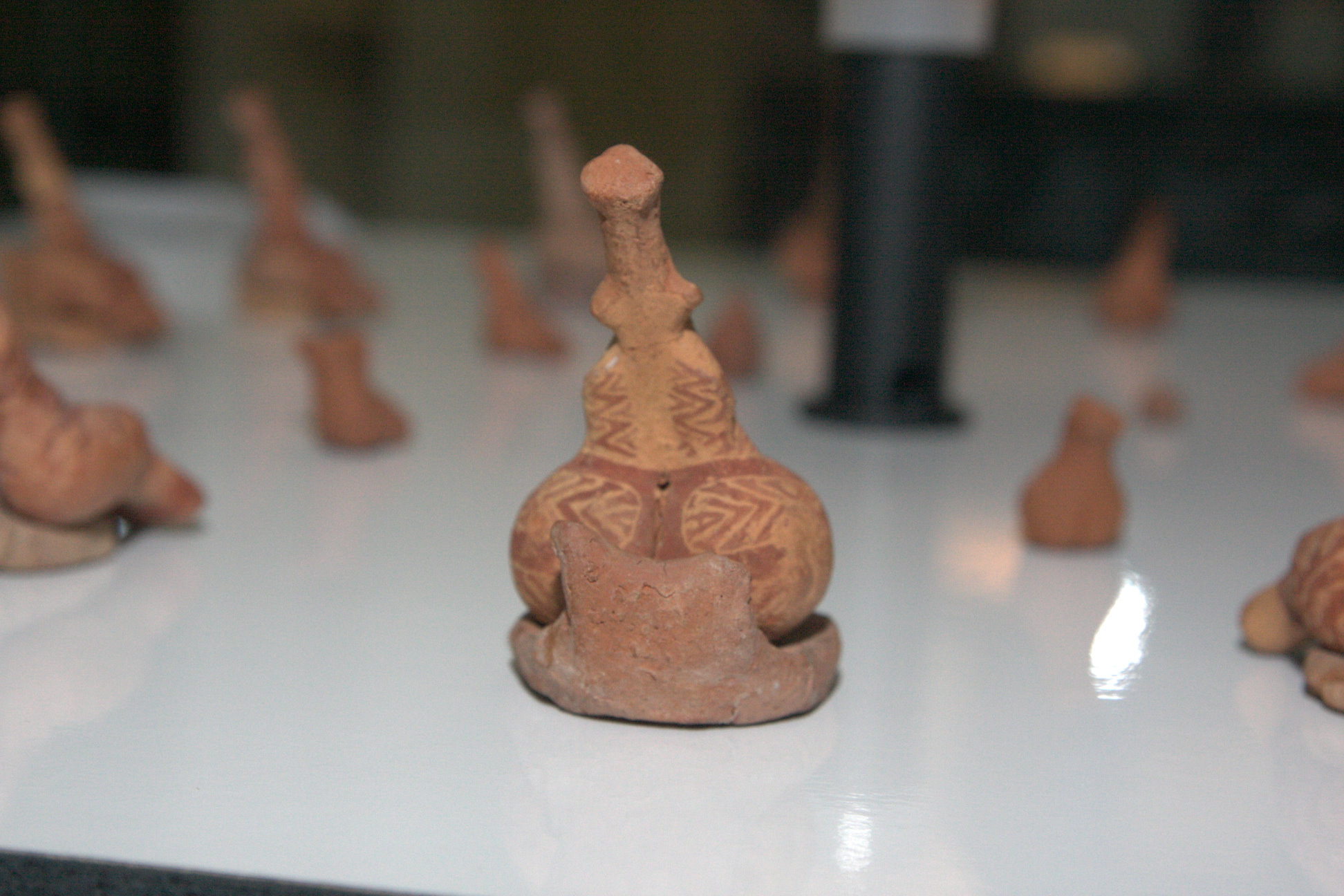

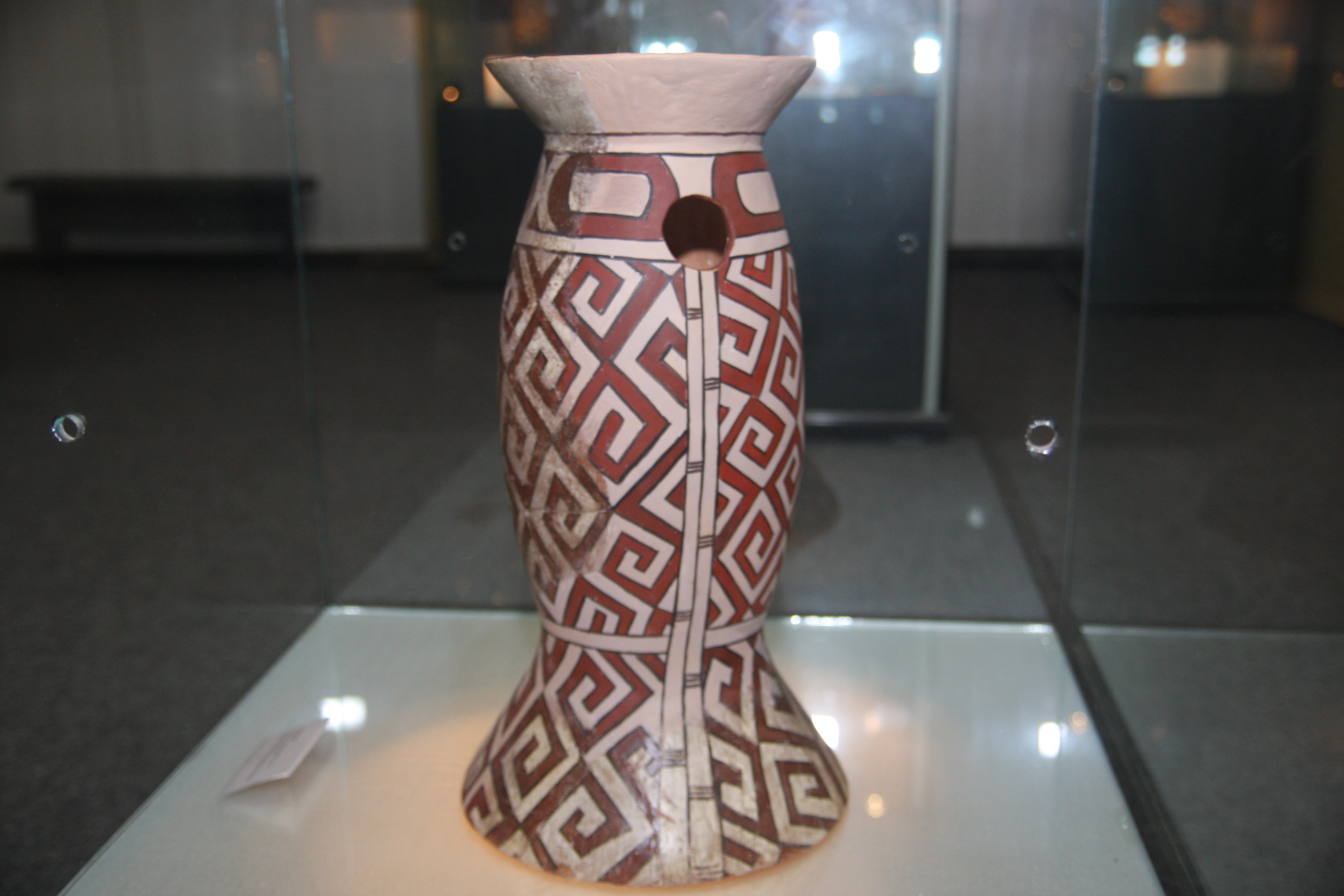

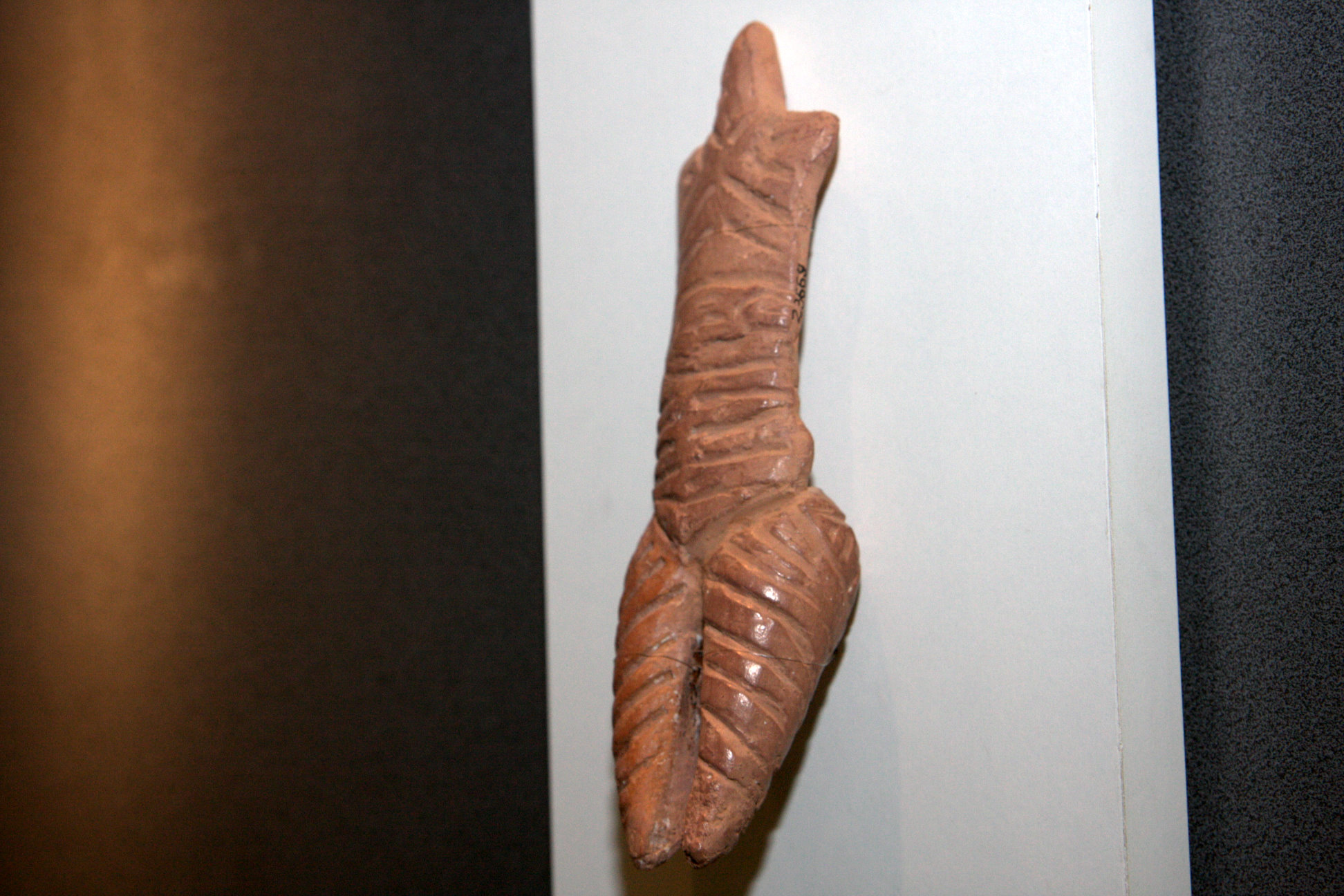

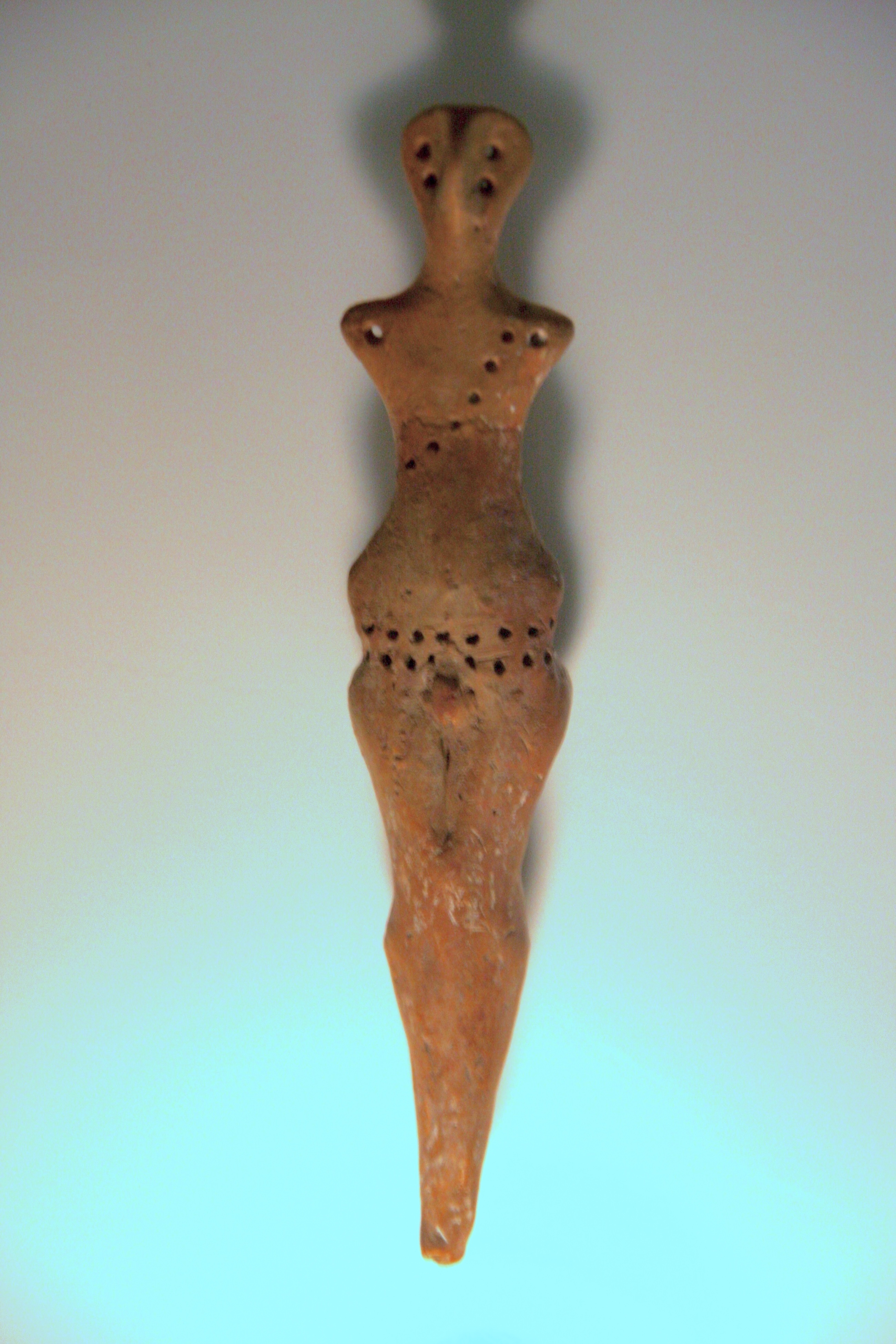

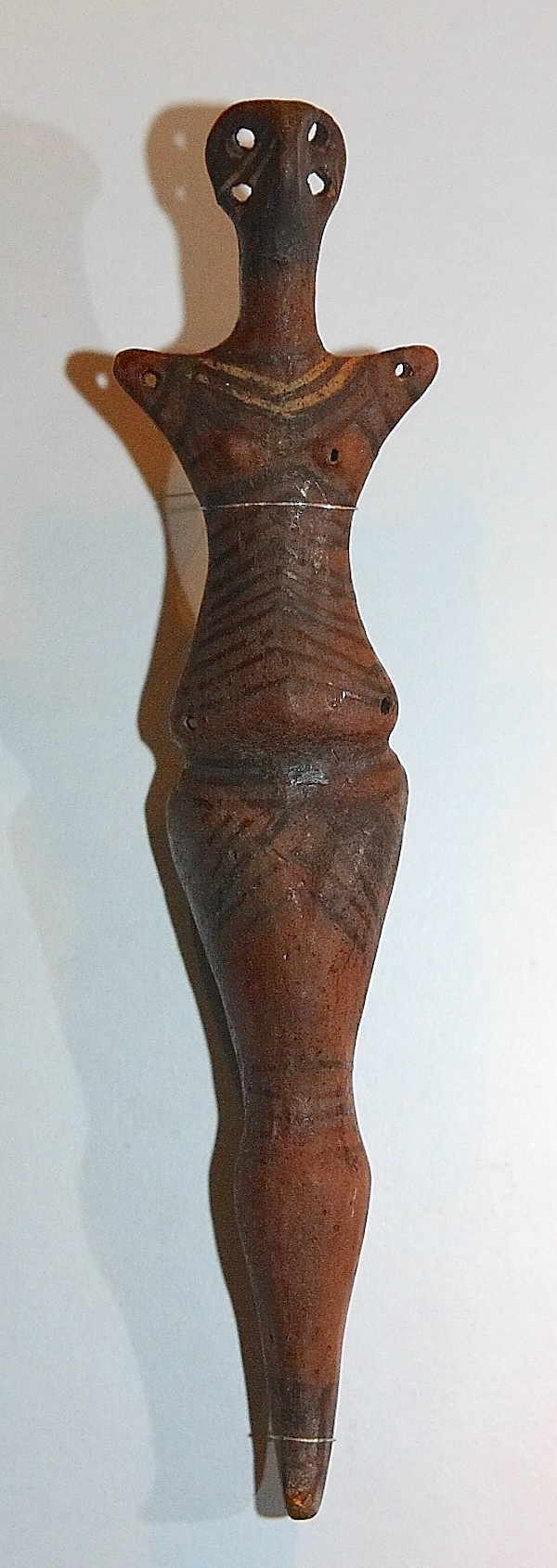

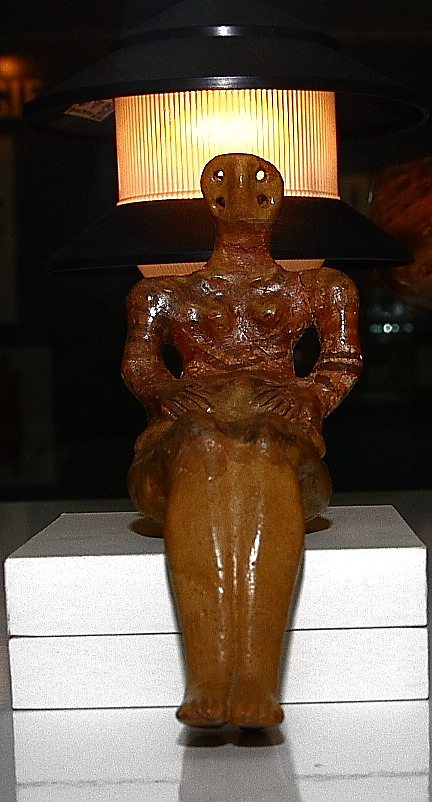

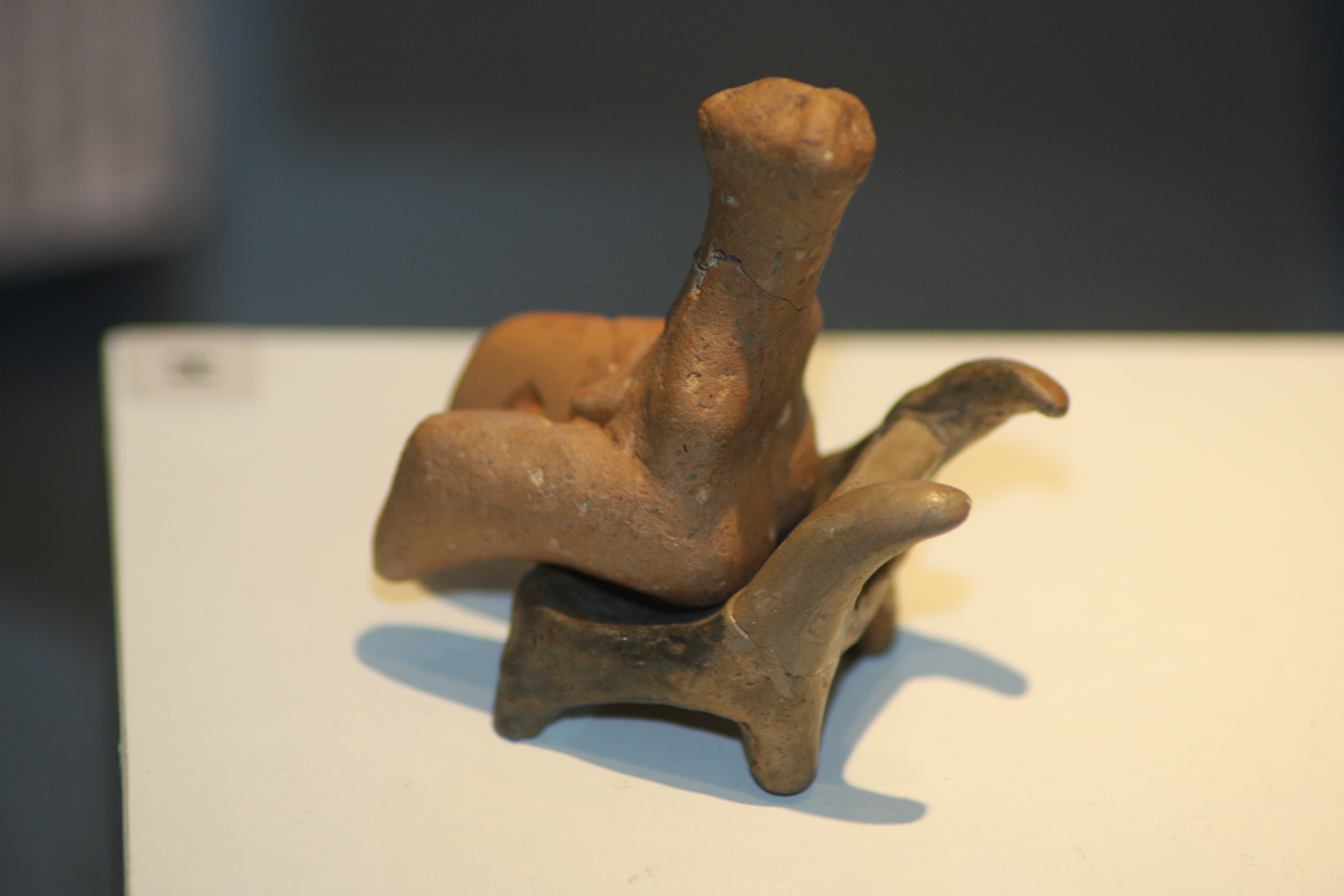

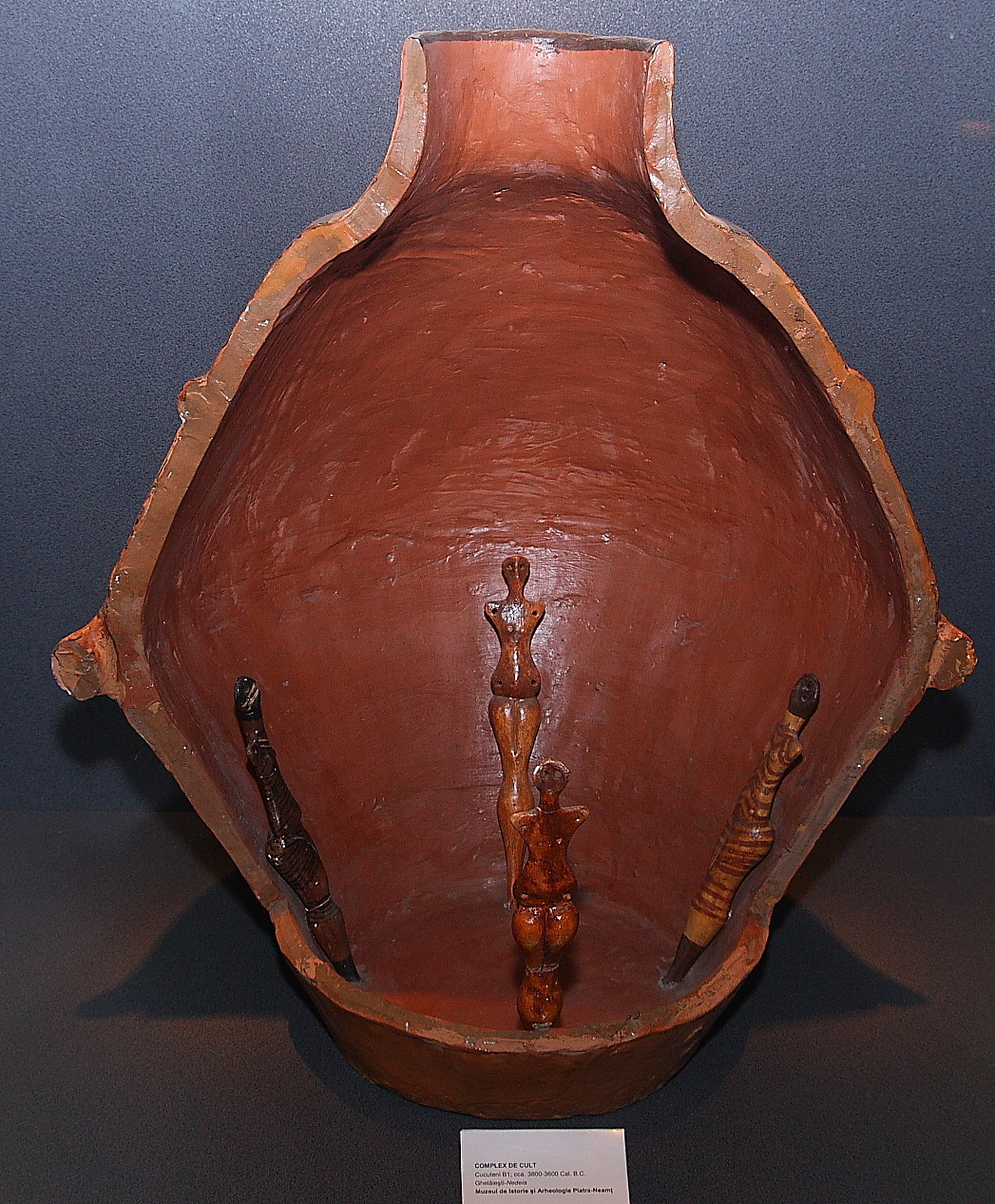

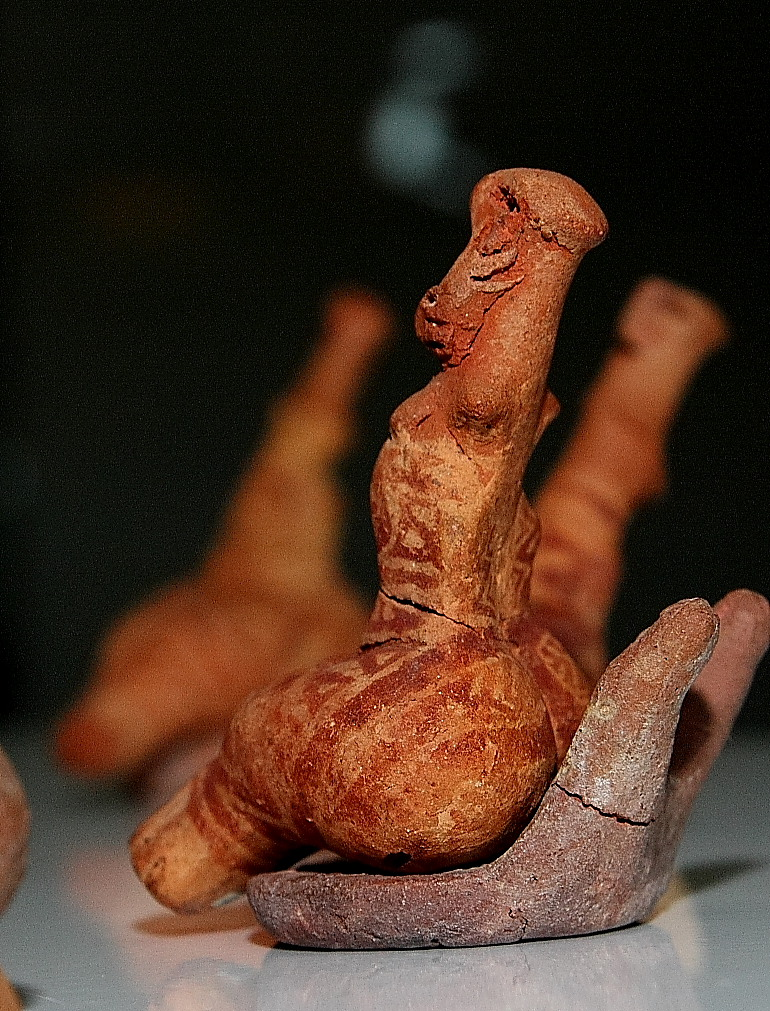

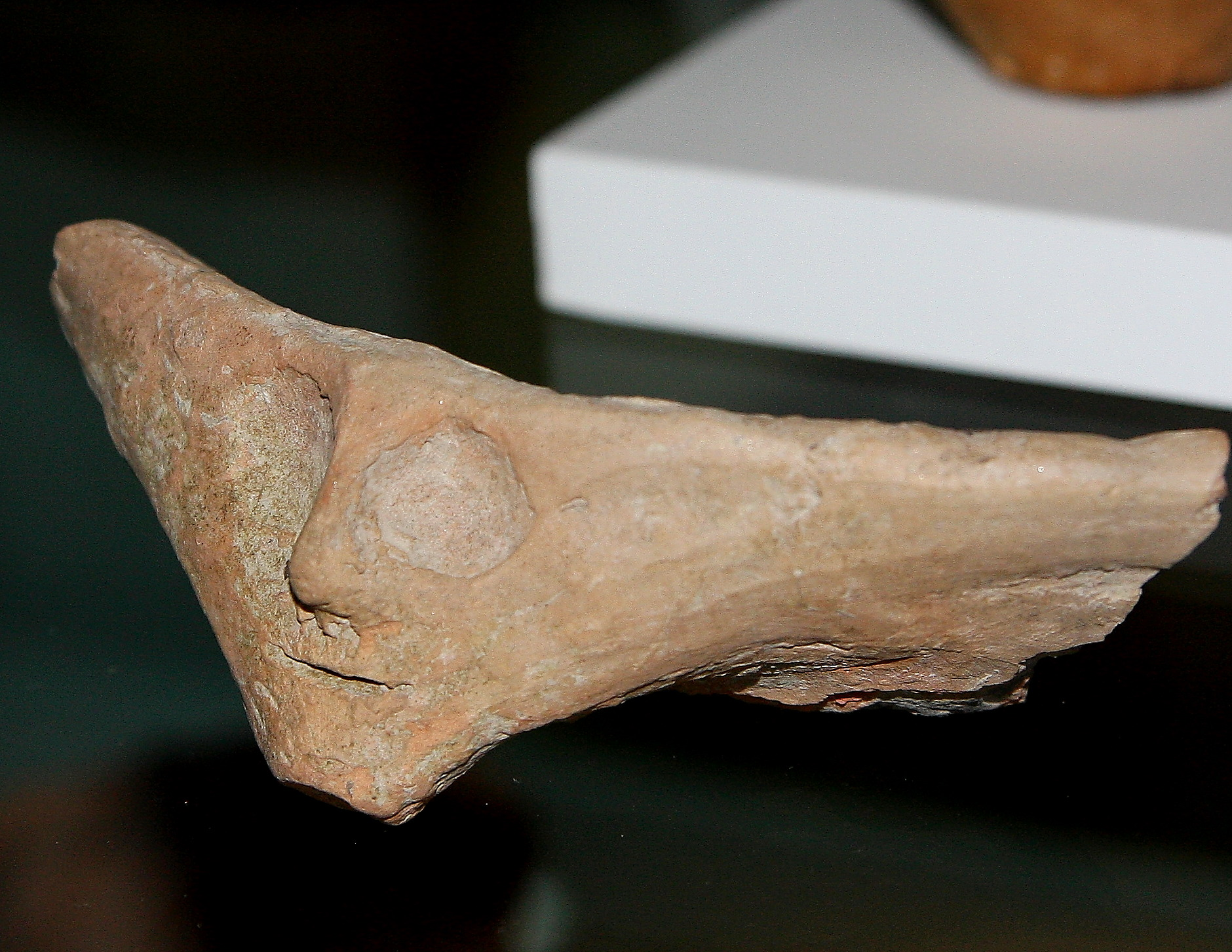
