= Dacia (journal) =

Romanian academic journal

Dacia Revistă arheologică și de istorie veche
- Discipline: Archaeology
- Language: Romanian, French, English, German, Russian

Publication details
- Former name: Dacia: Recherches et découvertes archéologiques en Roumanie
- History: 1924-present
- Publisher: Vasile Pârvan Institute of Archeology (Romania)
- Frequency: annual

Standard abbreviations
- ISO 4: Dacia

Indexing
- ISSN: 0070-251X

Links
- Journal homepage; online access

Dacia: Revistă arheologică și de istorie veche is a Romanian academic journal, the professional publication of Vasile Pârvan Institute of Archaeology, institute of the Romanian Academy. The magazine, active for over 84 years, was founded in 1924 by archaeologist and Romanian historian Vasile Pârvan, in whose honour the institute was appointed. It has identical subsections in four languages: French, English, German and Russian, having quality content and graphic presentation, Dacia quickly became a name to watch in the world of archaeology.

== History ==
There are two series, conventionally called the "old series" and the "new series", whose interruption, between 1948 and 1957, was generated by obviously political reasons, which had been typical of hard times through which Romania had passed during those years.

=== Old series ===
The original title of the archaeology magazine when it was founded was Dacia: Recherches et découvertes archéologiques en Roumanie, with identical subtitles in English and French, inviting the publication of articles in these languages of international circulation. This series, which ceased publication in 1948, stopped at issues XI-XII.

=== New series ===
The new series began its appearance in 1957, commemorating 75 years since the birth of the great Romanian historian and archaeologist Vasile Pârvan (September 28 1882, Perchiu, Bacău County). Currently the magazine is called Dacia - Archaeological and Ancient History Magazine, with identical subtitles in four circulation languages: French, English, German and Russian. From this series there have appeared, until 2011, fifty-five issues, numbered in Roman numerals, from I to LV, and a recent supplement.

== See also ==
- Romanian archaeology
