= Ion Nestor =

Romanian historian and archaeologist

- Born: 25 August 1905
- Died: 29 November 1974 (aged 69)

Academic background
- Education: University of Bucharest; Philipps University of Marburg

Academic work
- Discipline: history; archaeology

Ion Nestor (25 August 1905, Focșani – 29 November 1974, Bucharest) was a Romanian historian and archaeologist. In 1955, he became a corresponding member of the Romanian Academy.

== Biography ==
After attending Unirea High School in Focșani, he pursued his studies at the University of Bucharest, taking courses at the Faculty of Letters and Philosophy, Department of Classical Philology. In 1926, he obtained a degree in classical philology and secondary archaeology. His interest in education facilitated his specialisation in 1928–1932 in Berlin and Marburg (Lahn), while participating in the archaeological research that revealed the Neolithic culture of Goldberg (ordlingen). Because of his stay in Berlin he also got acquainted with some materials preserved kept at the Museum of Archeology, at the prehistoric section, coming from the Romanian territory, collected in the previous decades. When he got familiar with these materials it allowed him to make the records for those from the Cucuteni, Sărata Monteoru, Cernavodă, and other cultures.

Nestor was, together with Sorin Pavel and Petre Pandrea, author of the Manifestul "Crinului Alb" (White Lily Manifesto), published in the no. 8-9 editions (August–September) of 1928 of the magazine "Gândirea" (The Thinking). He became, according to critic Zigu Ornea, a follower of the racist ideology of the German philosopher Oswald Spengler.

=== Career ===
In 1932 he submitted his PhD thesis at the Philipps University of Marburg, with a relevant analysis of the state of research in the field of Romanian prehistory. The examination commission, highly appreciating the researcher's contribution, recommended him to undertake further research to allow the writing of an extensive paper that would provide a wide range of data on the evolution of human life in the Carpatho–Danubian–Pontic territory in ancient times. The historiographical and archaeological term Thraco-Cimmerian was first introduced by Nestor during this study. This work, which through the completions made became a laborious synthesis, was published in 1933 in German (Der Stand der Vorgerschichtsforschung in Rumänien) and was awarded the "Vasile Pârvan" Award by the Romanian Academy.

The passionate researcher considered that of his duty to deepen the problems by corroborating the information already acquired, hoarded in museum collections. Thus, on 13 February 1934, Nestor, assistant at the National Museum of Antiquities, informed the leadership of the Ministry of Instruction, Cults and Arts that he published in Berlin, under the auspices of the German Archaeological Institute, a synthesis of Romanian prehistory. Considering that it is necessary to complete the documentation based on visits to museums and taking photographs, he requested material support from the ministry. The Minister's resolution of 13 February 1934 requested the academician Ioan Andrieșescu, director of the National Museum of Antiquities in Bucharest, to report on this issue. Prompt answer was received on 18 February 1934 from Andrieșescu, who gave a warm recommendation to Nestor.

The PhD in History, archaeologist, with an intense activity within the National Museum of Antiquities and the Institute of Archeology in Bucharest, he coordinated during the years of activity the researches on the archaeological sites from Glina, Sărata Monteoru, Zimnicea, Glăvăneștii Vechi, Corlăteni, Suceava, Dridu, Bratei, and Păcuiul lui Soare.

From 1945 he carried out at the same time a prestigious didactic career as a professor at the University of Bucharest, contributing to the formation of disciples (such as noted archaeologist Alexandru Vulpe) who, through what they achieved, proved that they properly received what was invested by their mentor, Ion Nestor. Through the studies undertaken, Ion Nestor contributed to the substantiation of the formation process of the Romanian people, constituting at the same time a valuable methodological guide for the younger collaborators through the way of analysis, synthesis, and support of the stated theses.

Nestor had major contributions in the field of periodisation of Neolithic and Eneolithic cultures of the transition period that led to the metal age. His contributions were integrated in the treatise Istoria României, vol. I, 1960 and in Istoria poporului român, 1970.

A pedantic publicist, those entrusted to the press constitute a permanent methodological guide. The appreciation from foreign researchers was also materialised by entrusting the mission of being editor for Romania of the contributions integrated in the Archaeological Inventory and Prähistorische Bronzefunde, as well as by his election as a member of the German Archaeological Institute, the Yugoslav Archaeological Society, the Permanent Council of the International Union for Prehistoric and Protohistoric Sciences, and the International Union of Slavic Archeology. On 2 July 1955, he was elected a corresponding member of the Romanian Academy.

As a trainer for future researchers, Ion Nestor has paid a lot of attention to the way of stating the findings by each of participant on the site, intervening, when he considered it necessary, with connections that allowed a clarification of the problem in question. Pedantic to detail, he asked the collaborators to pay attention to every detail encountered during the excavation, the immediate recording of what was observed, then allowing an analysis whose purpose was to understand the evolution of the way of life of the creators of material and spiritual culture.

== Awards ==
Ion Nestor was a Laureate of the Romanian People's Republic State Award (1962).
