= A.D. Xenopol Institute of History =

Romanian research institute

Coordinates: 47°10′23.63″N 27°34′26.49″E

The A.D. Xenopol Institute of History (Romanian: Institutul de Istorie „A.D. Xenopol”) in Iași is an institution of research in the field of history under the auspices of the Romanian Academy. The institute was named in honour of Romanian historian Alexandru Dimitrie Xenopol.

The institute was founded in 1941 by Professor Ilie Minea as the "A.D. Xenopol Institute for the History of Romanians" within the Alexandru Ioan Cuza University, and became an independent entity in 1943, as the "A.D. Xenopol Institute of National History". In 1970 it was renamed the "A.D. Xenopol Institute of History and Archaeology", and placed under the authority of the Academy of Social and Political Sciences of the Socialist Republic of Romania.

After the fall of the Communist regime and the disbandment of the Academy of Social and Political Sciences, the Institute passed under the aegis of the Romanian Academy. The archaeology section split off, forming the Iași Institute of Archaeology, and the institute acquired its present name.

== See also ==
- Romanian Academy
- Iași Institute of Archaeology
