= Huruiești =

- Commune
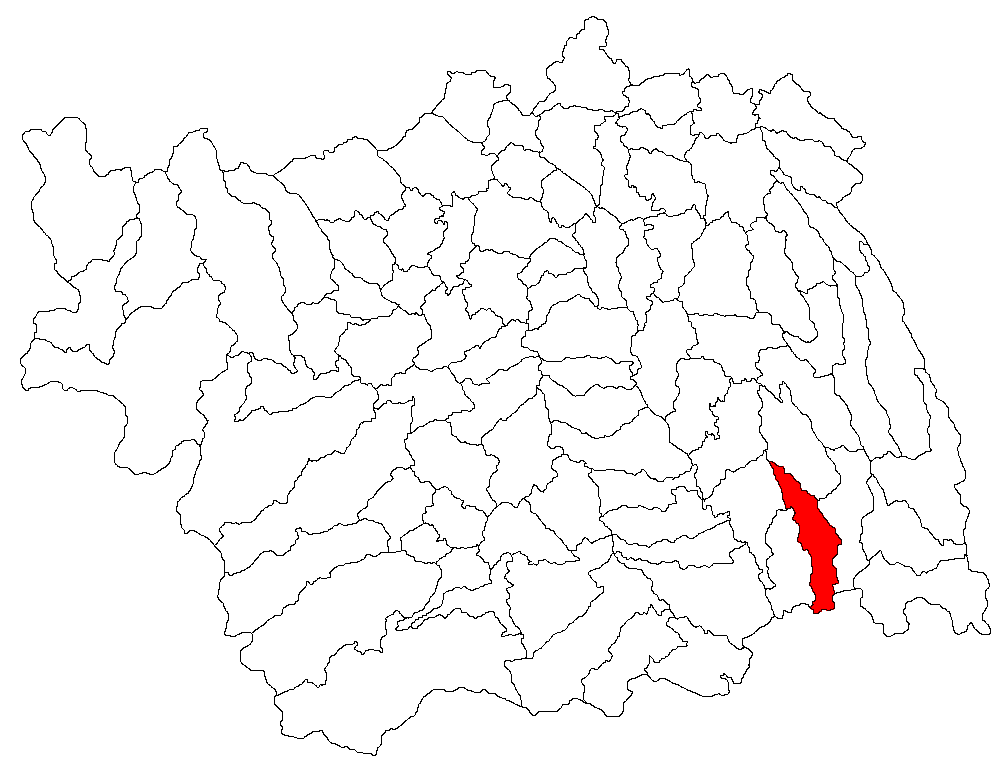
- Location in Bacău County

- Location in Romania
- Coordinates: 46°16′N 27°15′E
- Country: Romania
- County: Bacău

Government
  - Mayor (2024–2028): Marian Zăbrăuțanu (PSD)
- Area: 55.37 km^{2} (21.38 sq mi)
- Elevation: 202 m (663 ft)
- Population (2021-12-01): 2,029
  - Density: 36.64/km^{2} (94.91/sq mi)
- Time zone: UTC+02:00 (EET)
  - Summer (DST): UTC+03:00 (EEST)
- Postal code: 607250
- Area code: +(40) 0234
- Vehicle reg.: BC
- Website: huruiesti.ro

Huruiești is a commune in Bacău County, Western Moldavia, Romania. It is composed of seven villages: Căpotești, Florești, Fundoaia, Huruiești, Ocheni, Perchiu, and Prădaiș.

== Natives ==
- Vasile Pârvan (1882–1927), historian and archaeologist
