= Ștefan Ștefănescu =

Romanian historian (1929–2018)

Ștefan Ștefănescu (24 May 1929 – 29 December 2018) was a Romanian historian, titular member (since 1992) of the Romanian Academy. He was born in Goicea, Dolj County on 24 May 1929, and died in Bucharest on 29 December 2018, at the age of 89.
