= Institute of Archaeology and Art History, Cluj-Napoca =

Research institute in Romania

The Institute of Archaeology and Art History is an academic research institution in Cluj-Napoca, Romania.

== History ==
In the early days of 1990 began the process of rebirth of the Romanian Academy, a national institution of reference for Romanian culture and science, founded in 1866. Former Romanian Academy research institutes, temporarily affiliated with universities, have returned to the original jurisdiction.

The Institute of Archaeology and Art History of the Romanian Academy, established on March 3, 1990 through a government decision, together with the Institute of History "George Bariț" is continuing the traditions of scientific and research developed in 1920s by the Romanian National Historical Institute, the Romanian Institute of Classical Studies and the Romanian Art History Seminar.

== See also ==
- Lovers of Cluj-Napoca
- Romanian Academy
- Vasile Pârvan Institute of Archaeology
- Iași Institute of Archaeology
