= Vasile Pârvan Institute of Archaeology =

Archaeological institute in Romania

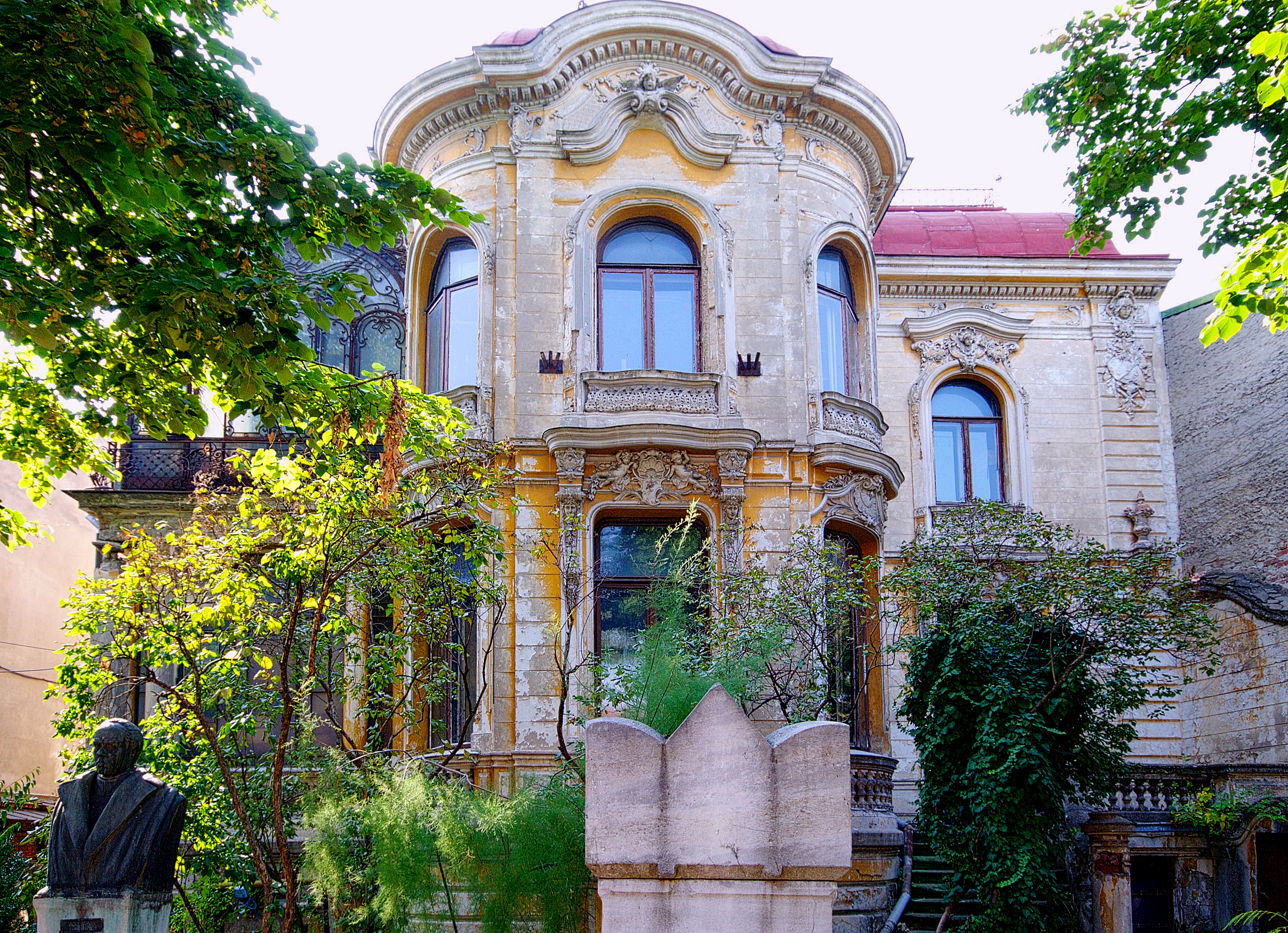
Vasile Pârvan Institute of Archaeology

The Vasile Pârvan Institute of Archaeology (Romanian: Institutul de Arheologie "Vasile Pârvan" ) is an institute of the Romanian Academy, located in Bucharest, Romania and specialized in prehistory, ancient history, classical archeology and medieval history. Since 1999, the director of the institute is the historian and archaeologist Alexandru Vulpe, a member of the Romanian Academy. The institute is located in Macca house, on Henri Coandă street, no. 11, Bucharest.

== History and collections ==
As the oldest research institution in Romania (dating back from 1834), the Vasile Pârvan Institute of Archaeology has a rich archaeological history, being involved in many excavations and studies carried out by Romanian and foreign archaeologists, and participating to international archaeological congresses and exhibitions. The institute has in possession the Romanian archaeological patrimony in numismatics and epigraphy, together with an extremely rich archive bearing on the general and institutional history of archaeology in Romania. This archive contains administrative documents, personal documents of various personalities of Romanian archaeology, reports concerning archaeological findings and research, heritage management, and correspondence with other institutions and personalities from within the country and abroad.

== International projects ==
The institute participates in the ARchives of European Archaeology (AREA) project, with the main research direction concerning the topic of "Archaeology abroad", investigating such aspects as: training of Romanian archaeologists in the western European countries and establishing connections with international museums and archaeologists.

== Publications ==
The institute has a professional publication with a continuous activity for over 80 years, Dacia archaeology journal, founded in 1924 by Romanian historian and archaeologist Vasile Pârvan, in whose honor the institute was named. The original title of the journal was Dacia - Recherches et découvertes archéologiques en Roumanie, and today is called Dacia - Revistă arheologică și de istorie veche, having identical subsections in four languages: French, English, German and Russian.

== See also ==
- Romanian archaeology
- List of Romanian archaeologists
- Romanian Academy
- Vasile Pârvan
- Iași Institute of Archaeology
- Institute of Archaeology and Art History, Cluj-Napoca
