= Iași Institute of Archaeology =

Coordinates: 47°10′45.09″N 27°34′22.19″E

The Iași Institute of Archaeology (Romanian: Institutul de Arheologie Iași; abbreviation: IAI) is an institution of research in the field of archaeology under the auspices of the Romanian Academy. The institute was founded in 1990 in Iași, when the archaeology section of the A.D. Xenopol Institute of History and Archaeology split off.

== Directors ==
- Alexander Rubel (2011–present)
- Victor Spinei (2003-2011)
- Dan G. Teodor (1990-2003)

== See also ==
- Romanian Academy
- Vasile Pârvan Institute of Archaeology
- Institute of Archaeology and Art History, Cluj-Napoca
- Romanian Academy in Rome
