= Composite order =

Architectural order

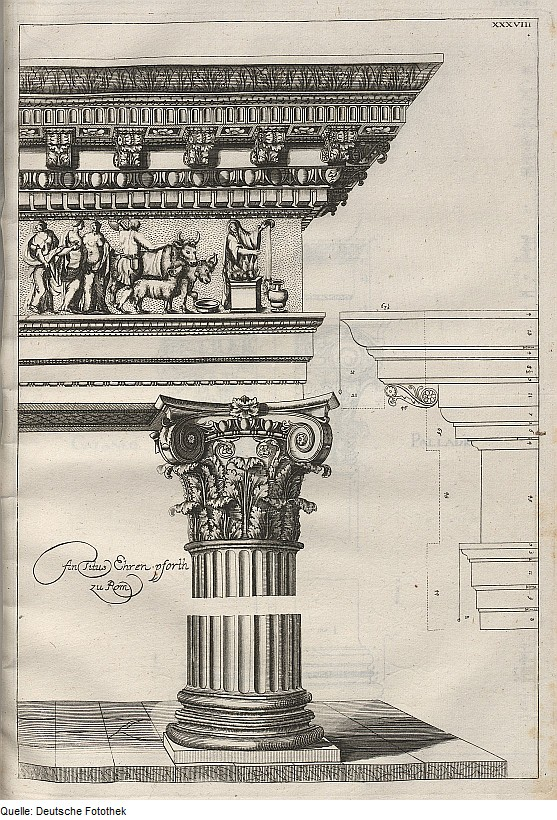
Illustration of the Composite order, made in 1695 and kept in Deutsche Fotothek

The Composite order is a mixed order, combining the volutes of the Ionic order capital with the acanthus leaves of the Corinthian order. In many versions the composite order volutes are larger, however, and there is generally some ornament placed centrally between the volutes. The column of the composite order is typically ten diameters high, though as with all the orders these details may be adjusted by the architect for particular buildings. The Composite order is essentially treated as Corinthian except for the capital, with no consistent differences to that above or below the capital.

The Composite order is not found in ancient Greek architecture and until the Renaissance was not ranked as a separate order. Instead it was considered as an imperial Roman form of the Corinthian order. Though the Arch of Titus, in the forum in Rome and built in 82 AD, is sometimes cited as the first prominent surviving example of a composite order, the order was probably invented "a little before Augustus's reign, and certainly well-developed before his death, the very time when the Roman version of Corinthian was being established."

With the Tuscan order, a simplified version of the Doric order, also found in ancient Roman architecture but not included by Vitruvius in his three orders, the Composite was added by Renaissance writers to make five classical orders. Sebastiano Serlio (1475–1554) published his book I Sette libri dell'architettura in 1537 in which he was the second to mention the Composite order as its own order and not just as an evolution of the Corinthian order as previously suggested by Leon Battista Alberti. Leon Battista Alberti in his De re aedificatoria (English: On the Art of Building) mentions the Composite order, calling it "Italic".

Compared of the Doric, Tuscan, Ionic, Corinthian and Composite orders

== Form of the capital ==
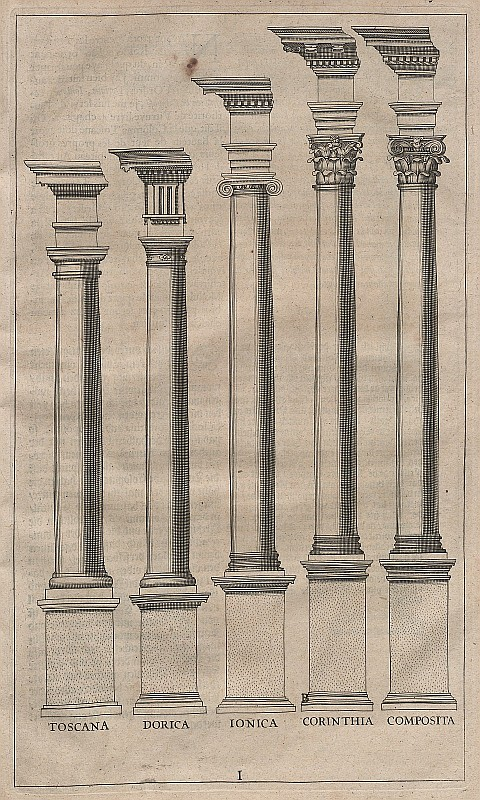
The Five Orders illustrated by Vignola, 1641

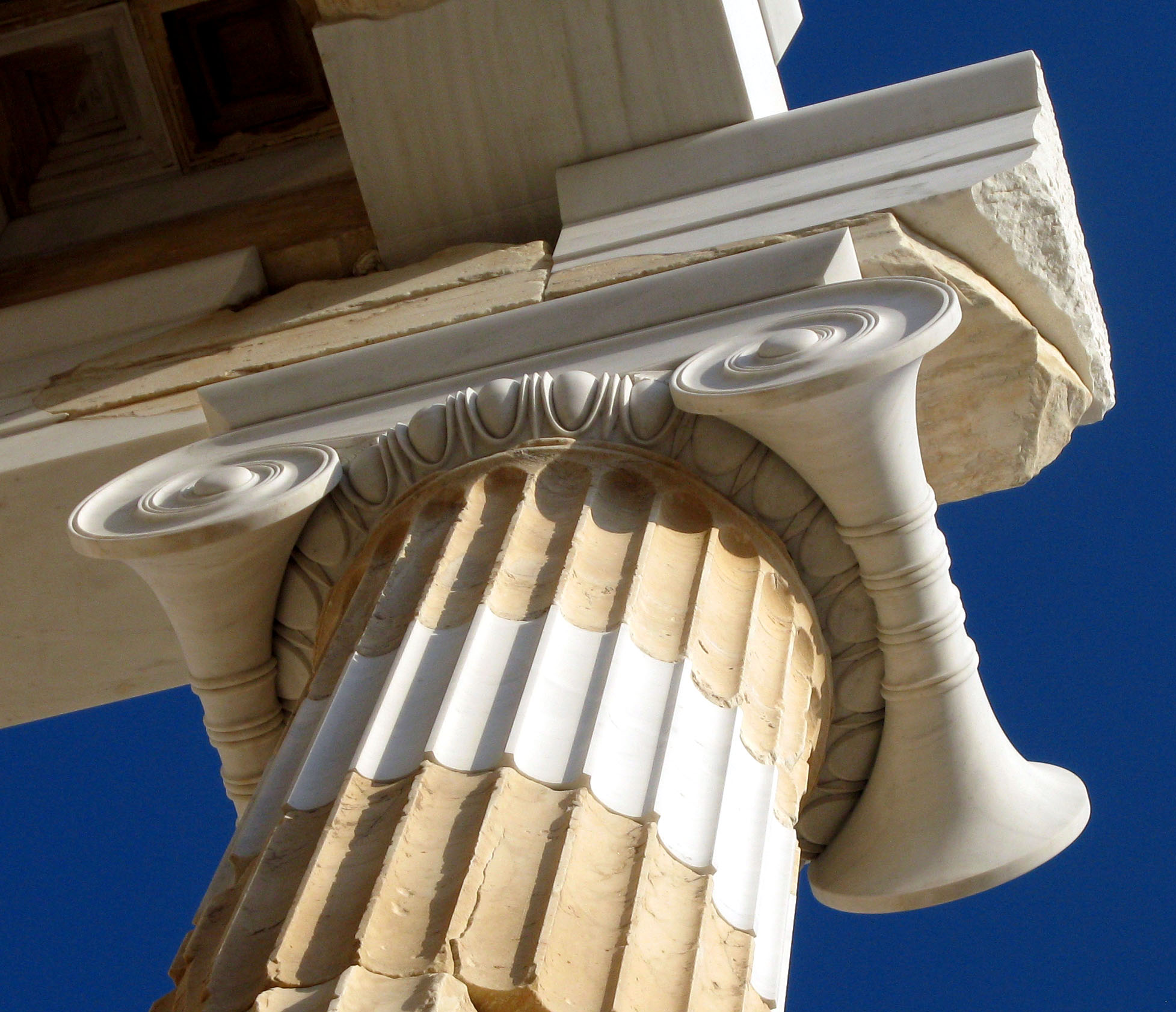
Unlike the Composite capital, this Ionic capital has a different appearance from the front and sides

The Composite is partly based on the Ionic order, where the volutes (seen frontally) are joined by an essentially horizontal element across the top of the capital, so that they resemble a scroll partly rolled at each end. Despite this origin, very many Composite capitals in fact treat the two volutes as different elements, each springing from one side of their leafy base. In this, and in having a separate ornament between them, they resemble the Archaic Greek Aeolic order, though this seems not to have been the route of their development in early Imperial Rome.

Equally, where the Greek Ionic volute is usually shown from the side as a single unit of unchanged width between the front and back of the column, the Composite volutes are normally treated as four different thinner units, one at each corner of the capital, projecting at some 45° to the façade. This has the advantage of removing the necessity to have a different appearance between the front and side views, and the Ionic eventually developed bending forms that also allowed this.

The treatment of details has often been very variable, with the inclusion of figures, heraldic symbols and the like in the capital. The relationship of the volutes to the leaves has been treated in many different ways, and the capital may be distinctly divided into different horizontal zones, or may treat the whole capital as a single zone. The composite order, due to its delicate appearance, was deemed by the Renaissance to be suitable for the building of churches dedicated to The Virgin Mary or other female saints. In general, it has since been used to suggest richness and grandeur.

== Examples ==
Donato Bramante (1444–1514) used the Composite order in the second order of the cloister of Santa Maria della Pace, Rome. For the first order, the Ionic order was used. Francesco Borromini (1599–1667) developed the Composite order in San Carlo alle Quattro Fontane, Rome (1638). The interior of the church has 16 Composite columns. The load-bearing columns placed underneath the arches have inverted volutes. This choice was highly criticised at the time, thinking it was a lack of knowledge of the Vittruvian orders that led him to his decision.

The inverted volutes can also be seen in Borromini's Oratorio dei Filippini in the lower order. There the controversy was even higher, considering that Borromini also removed the acanthus leaves, leaving a bare capital.

Roman

- Arch of Titus, Rome
- Arch of Septimius Severus, Rome
- Santa Costanza, Rome, interior, mid-4th century

Modern

- Ospedale degli Innocenti, Florence, 1421, Filippo Brunelleschi
- Palazzo Valmarana, Vicenza, 1565, Andrea Palladio
- Palazzo del Capitaniato, Vicenza, 1571–1572, Andrea Palladio
- Lescot Wing, Louvre Palace, Paris
- Church of the Gesù, Rome
- Easton Neston, England, c. 1700
- Palazzo Madama, Turin, c. 1720, Filippo Juvarra
- Archbasilica of St. John Lateran
- Somerset House, London, 1776, William Chambers
- Narva Triumphal Arch, Saint Petersburg, 1814
- Ethnographic Museum (former Palace of Justice), Budapest
- Alabama Governor's Mansion, 1907
- Akasaka Palace, Tokyo, 1909, Katayama Tokuma

== Gallery ==
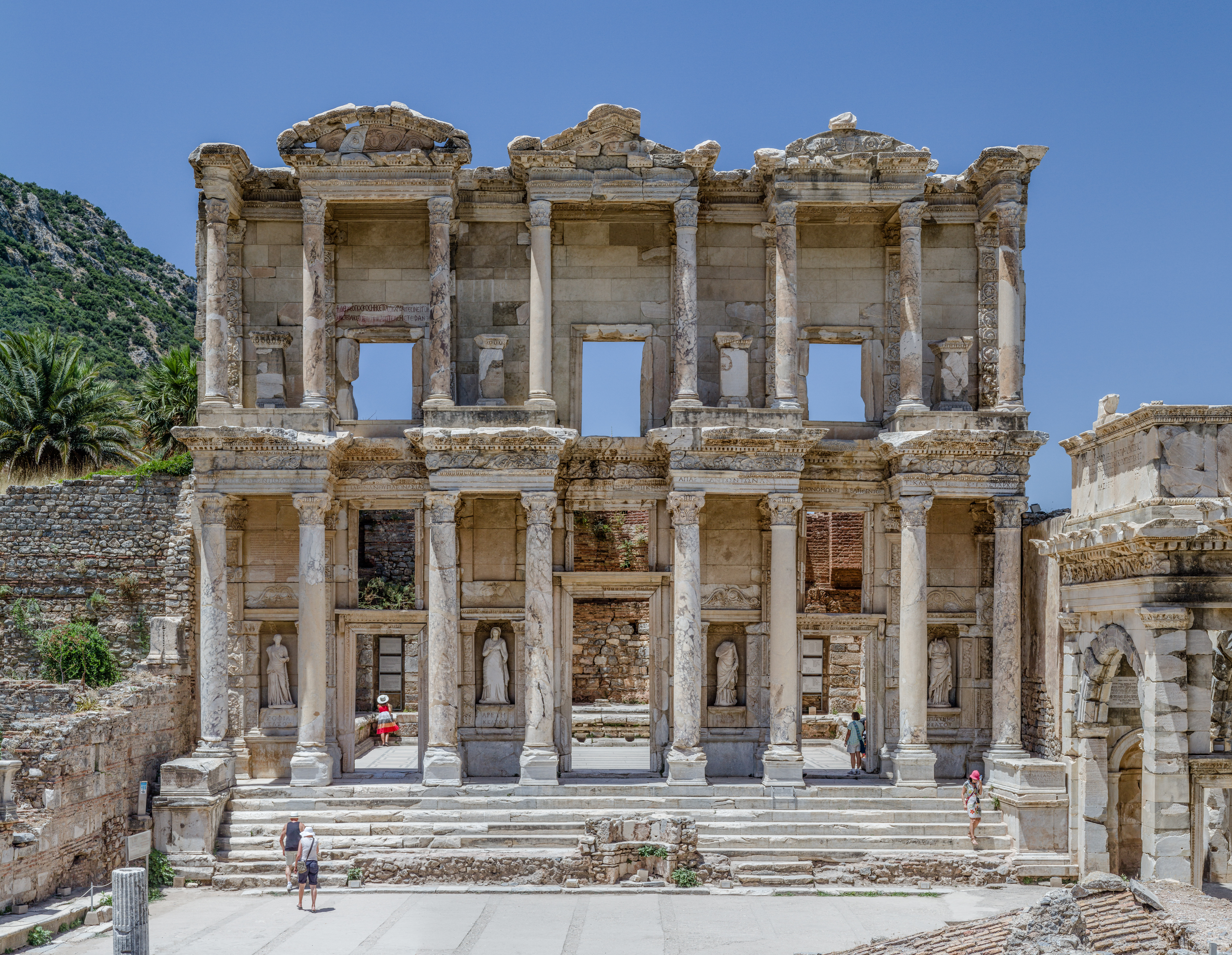
Roman Composite columns of the Library of Celsus, Ephesus, Turkey, unknown architect, c.110 AD

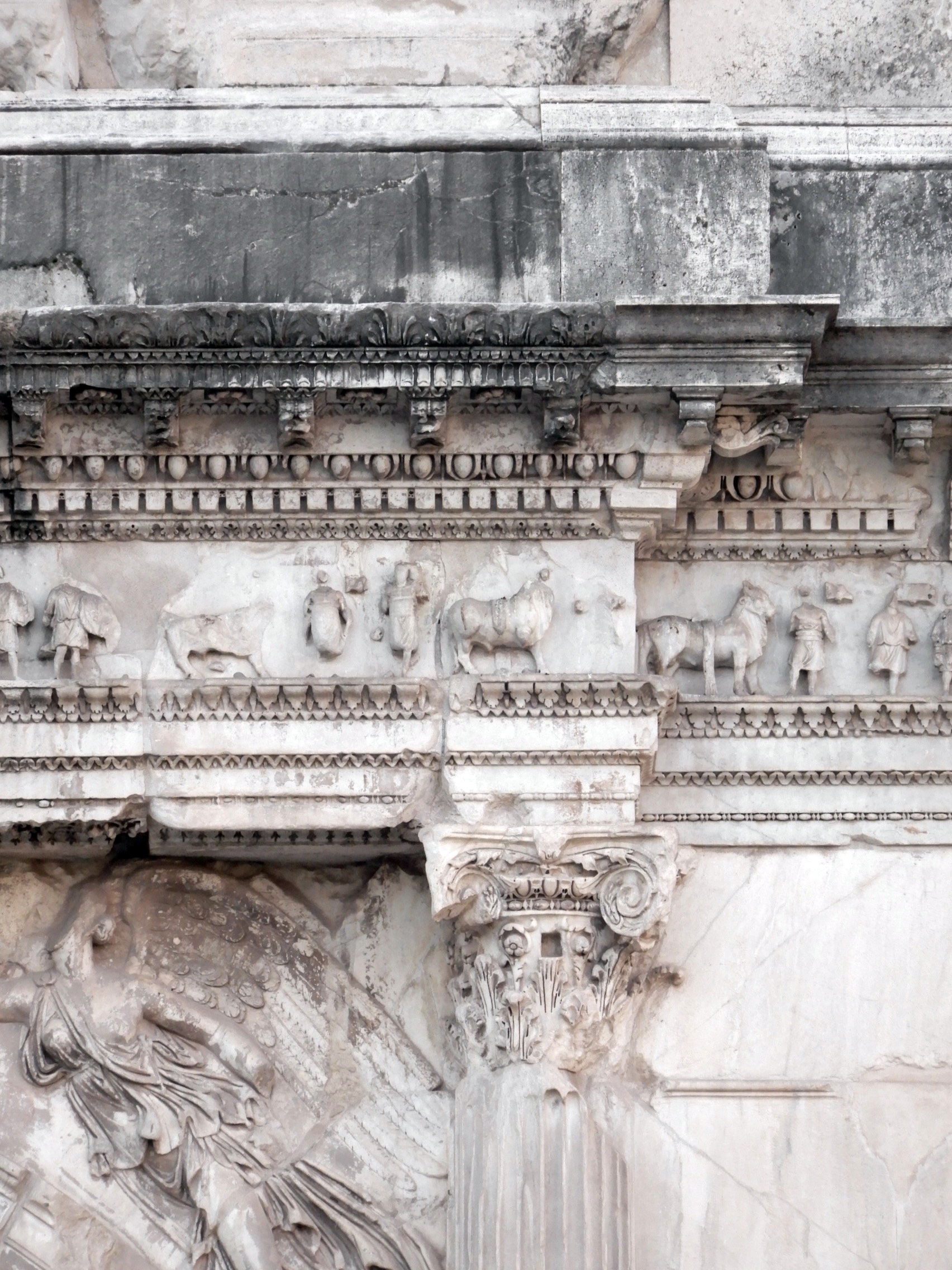
Roman Composite capital of the Arch of Titus, with a highly decorated entablature, Rome, unknown architect, 1st century

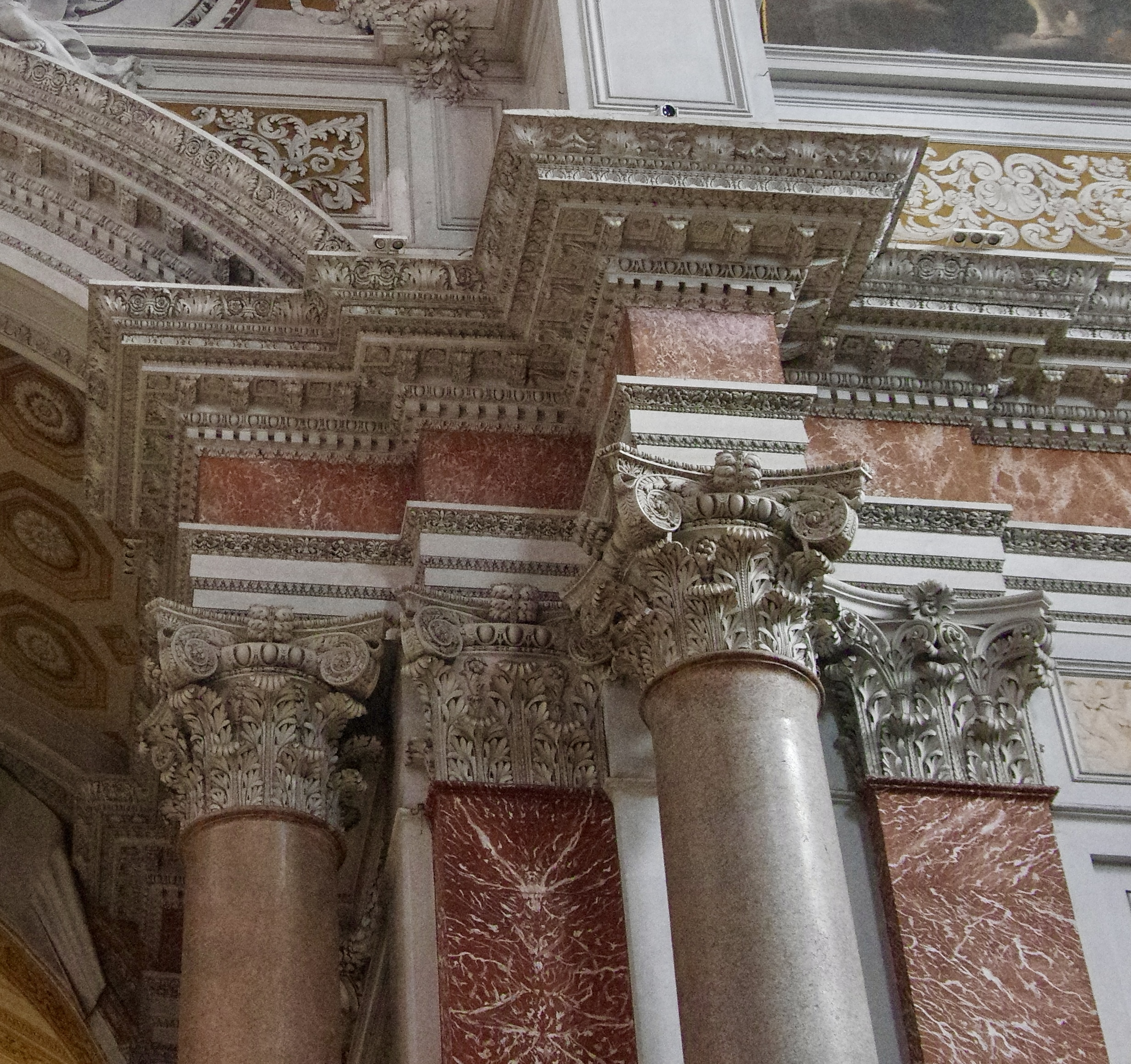
Roman Composite columns (not the pilasters) in the former Baths of Diocletian, Rome, now Santa Maria degli Angeli e dei Martiri, unknown architect, c.4th century

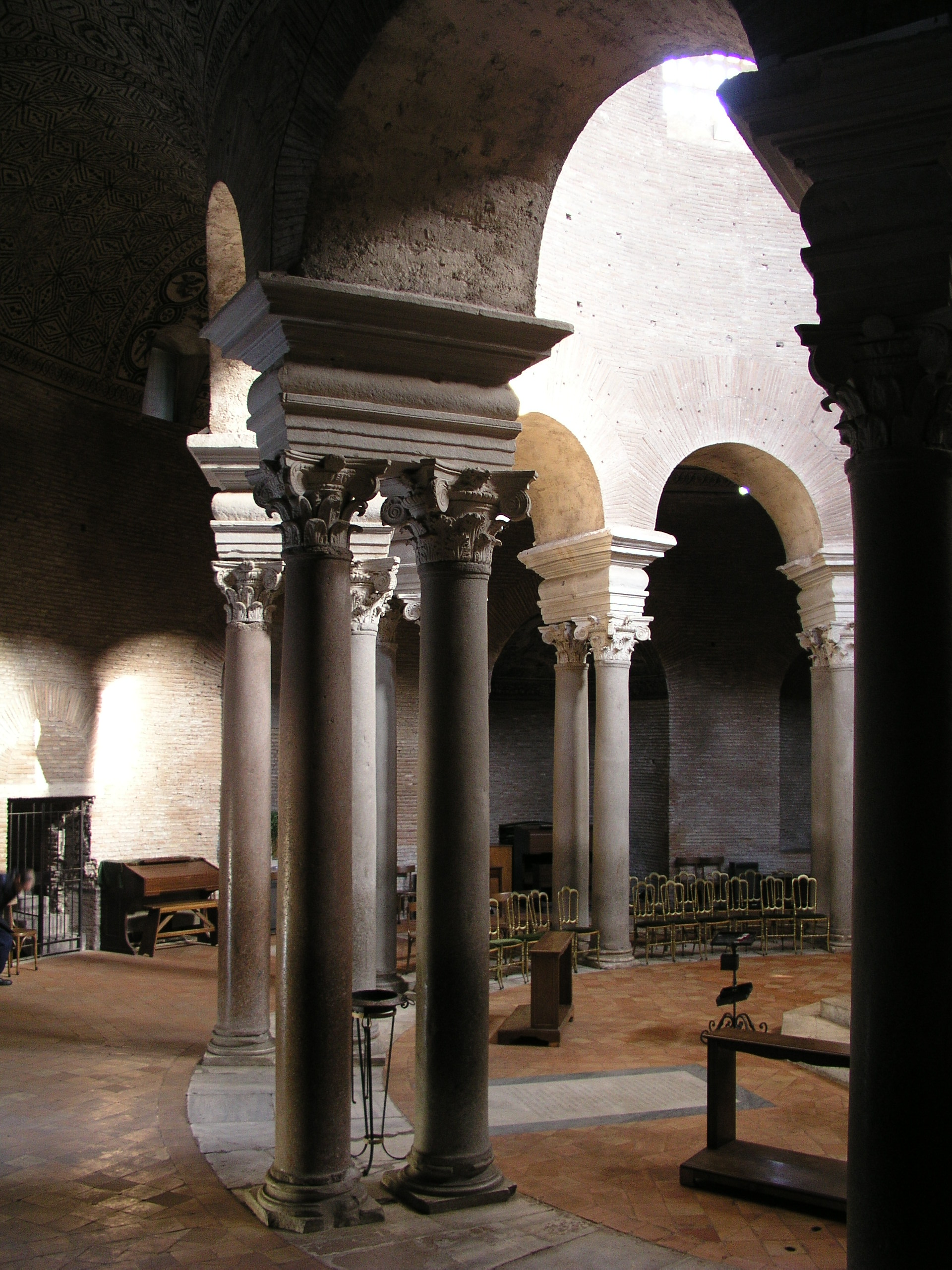
Roman Composite columns of the Church of Santa Costanza, Rome, originally built as a mausoleum to house the tomb of Constantina, daughter of Roman emperor Constantine the Great, unknown architect, 2nd quarter of the 4th century

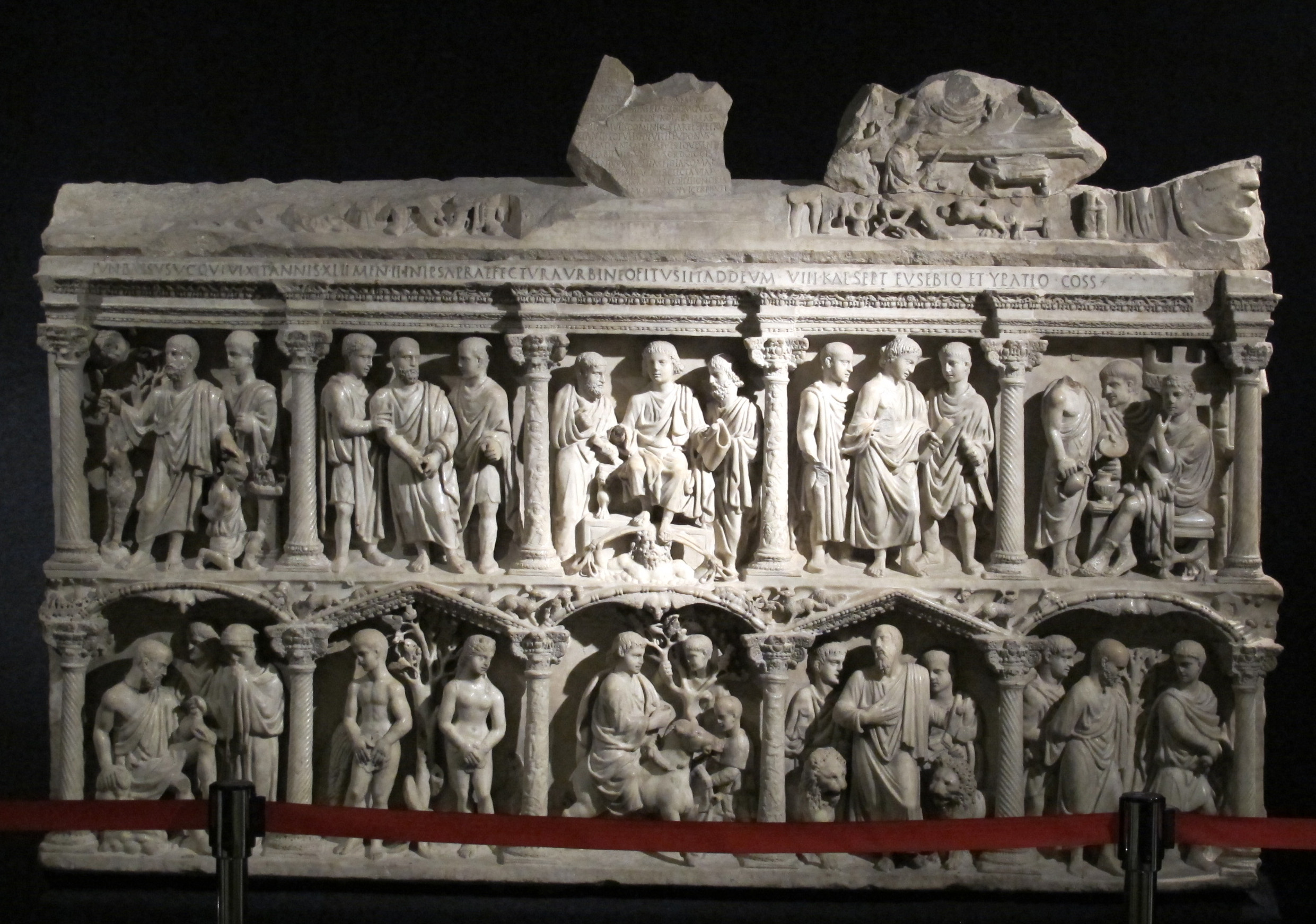
Roman Composite columns on the Sarcophagus of Junius Bassus, 359, marble, treasury of St. Peter's Basilica, Rome

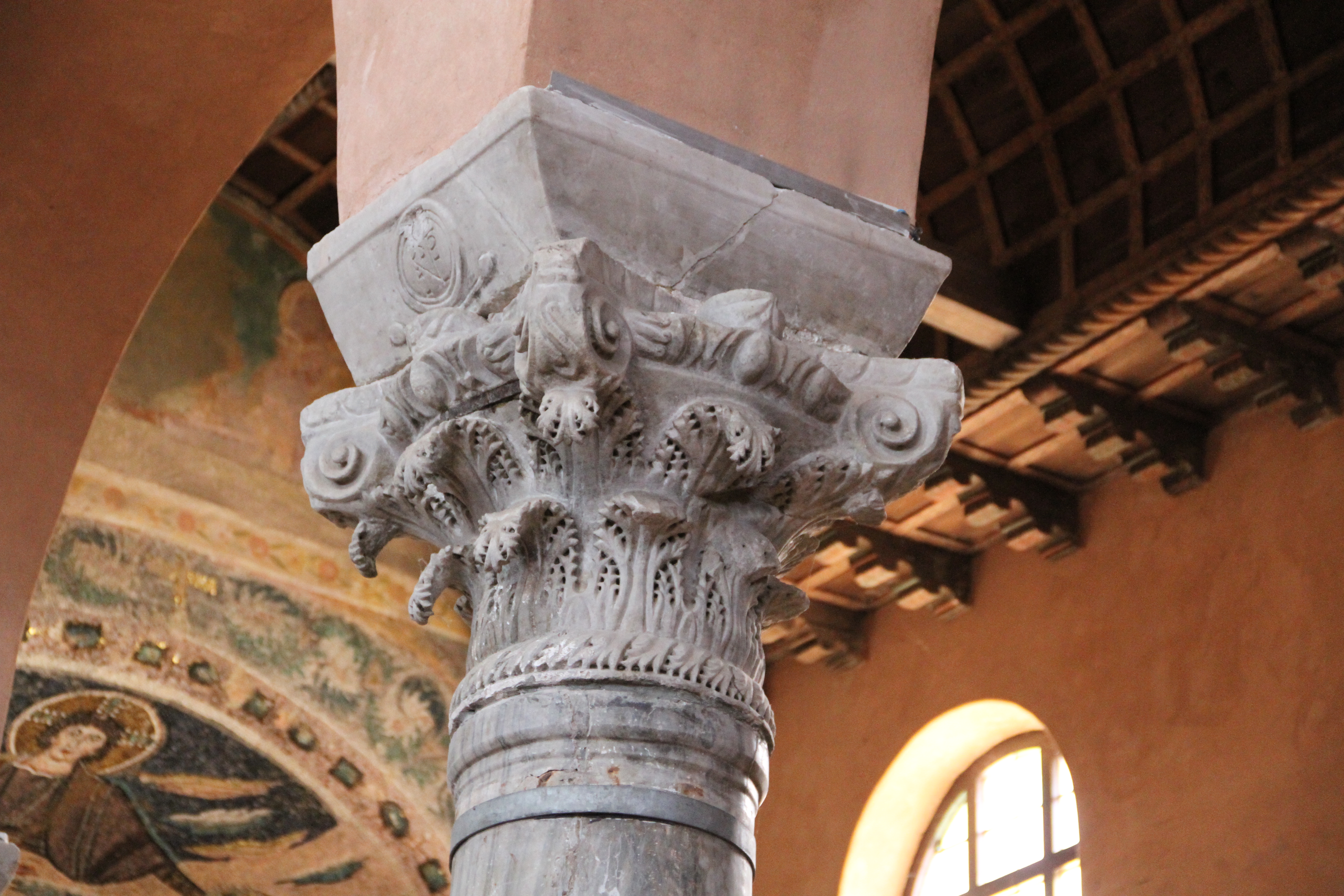
Byzantine Composite capital in the Euphrasian Basilica, Poreč, Croatia, unknown architect, 6th century

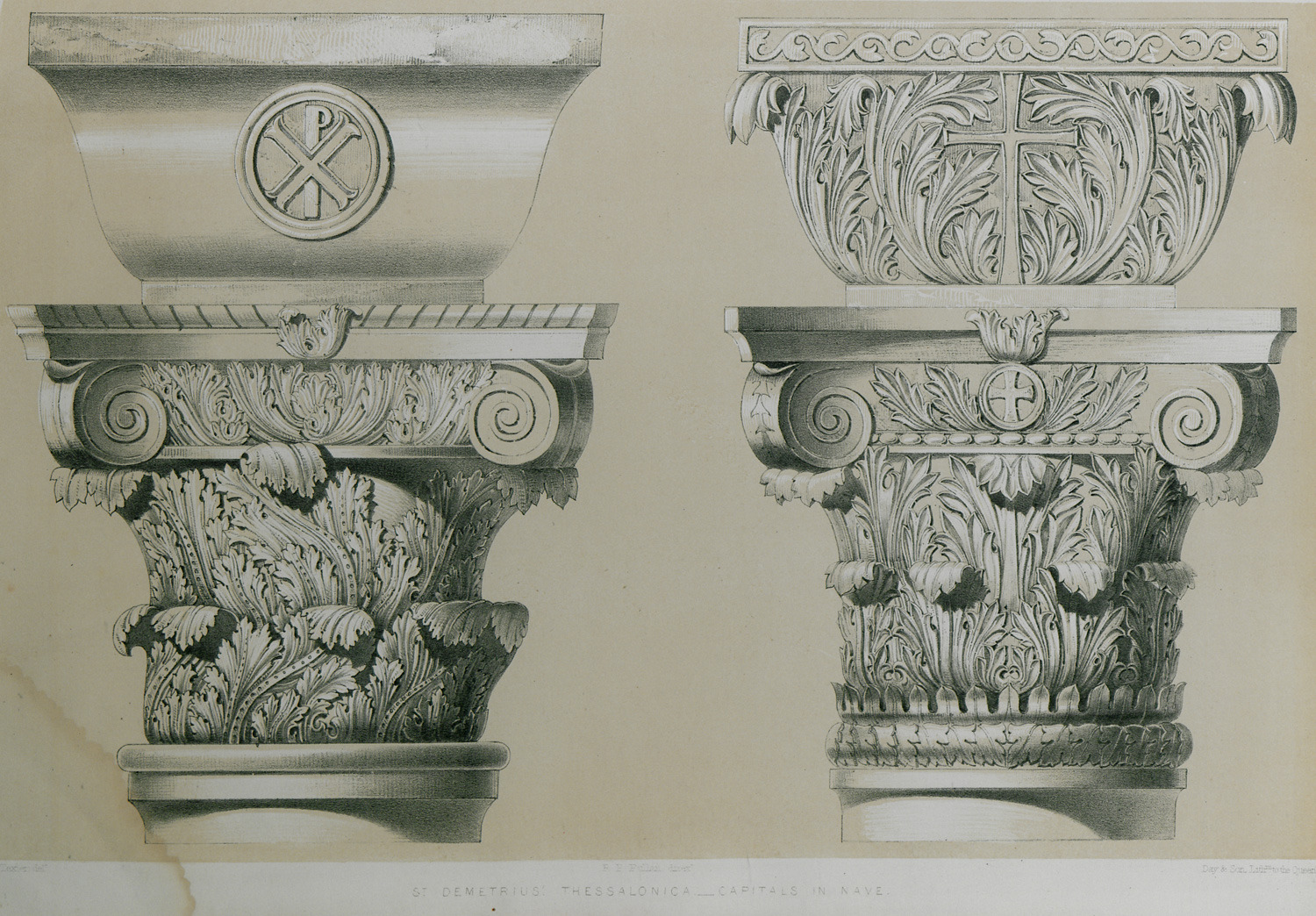
Byzantine reinterpretations of the Composite order in the Hagios Demetrios, Thessaloniki, Greece, unknown architect, 629–634

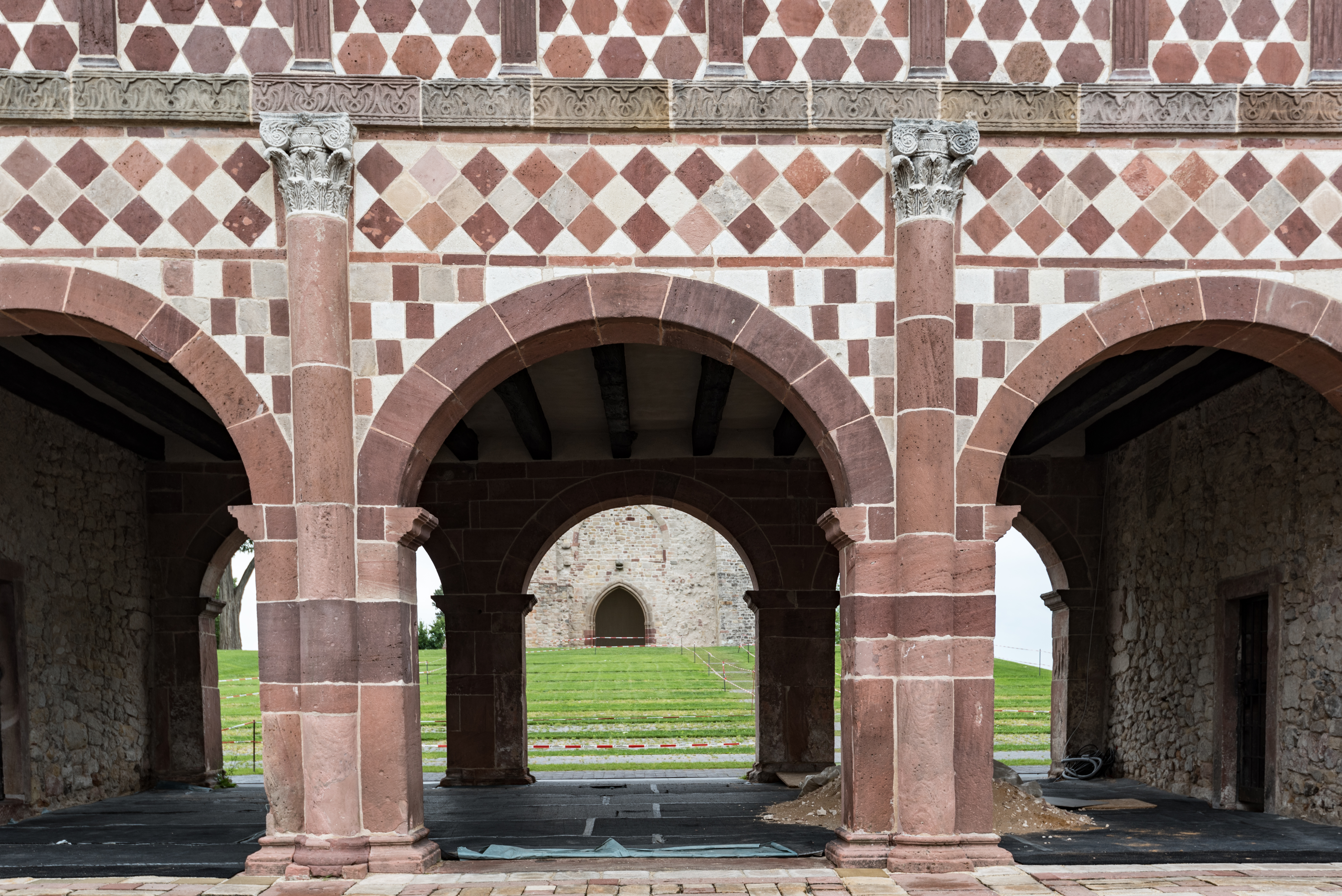
Carolingian Composite columns of the Lorsch Abbey gatehouse, Lorsch, Germany, unknown architect, c.800

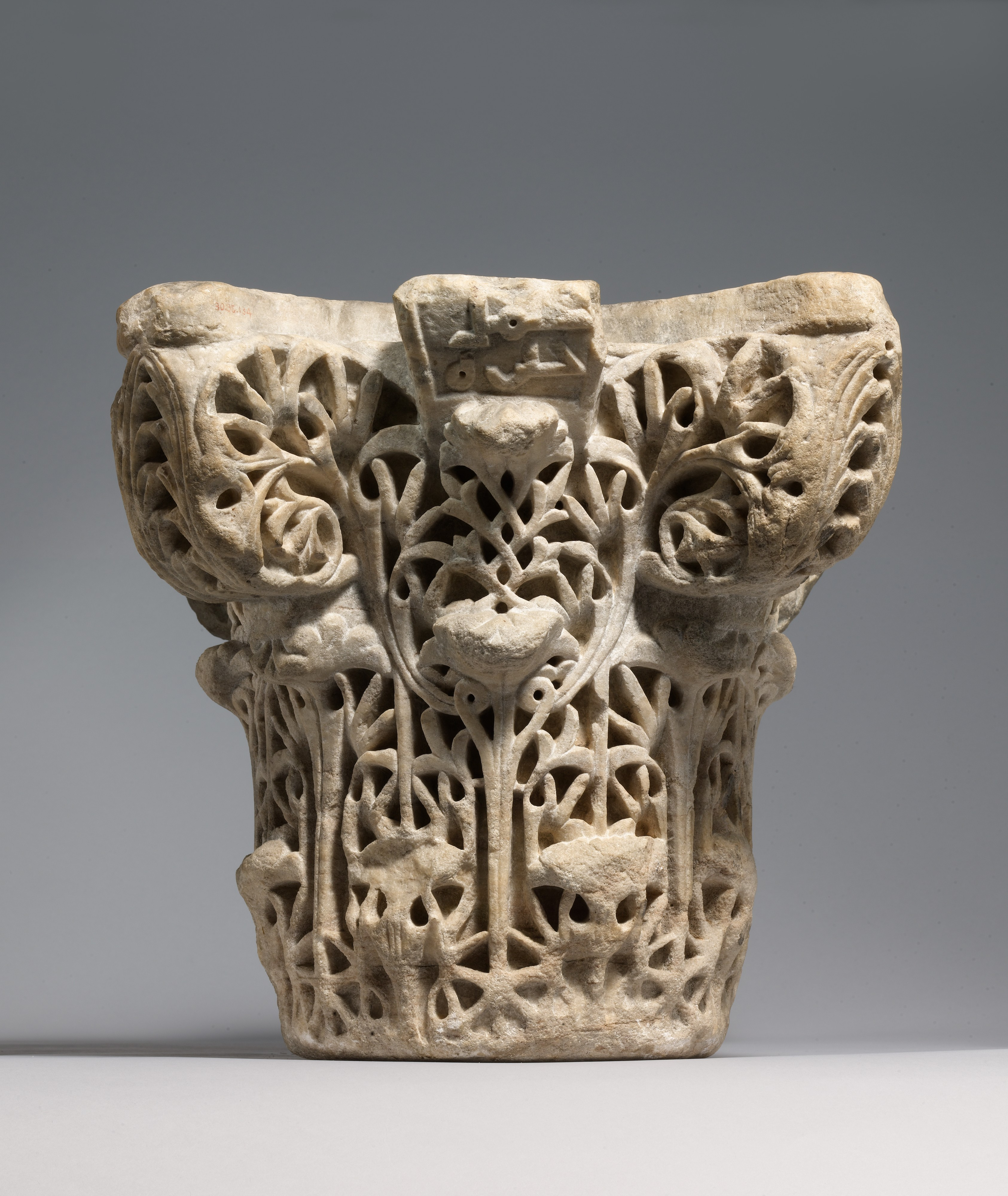
Islamic Composite capital with Arabic-inscribed abacus, probably from Medina Azahara in the Umayyad Caliphate of Córdoba, 10th century, marble, Metropolitan Museum of Art, New York

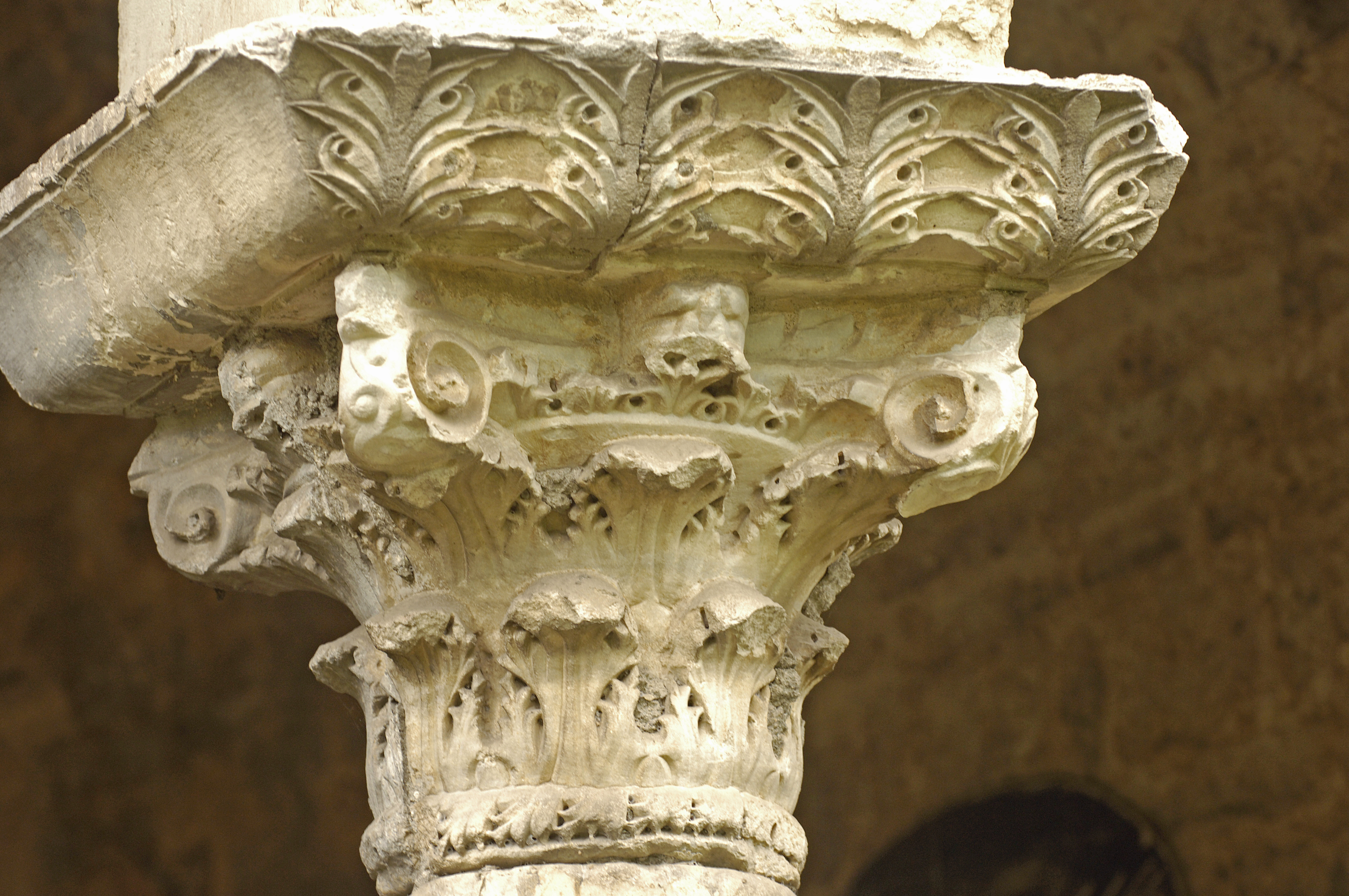
Byzantine reinterpretations of the Composite order in the Hagia Sophia, Trabzon, Turkey, unknown architect, 13th century

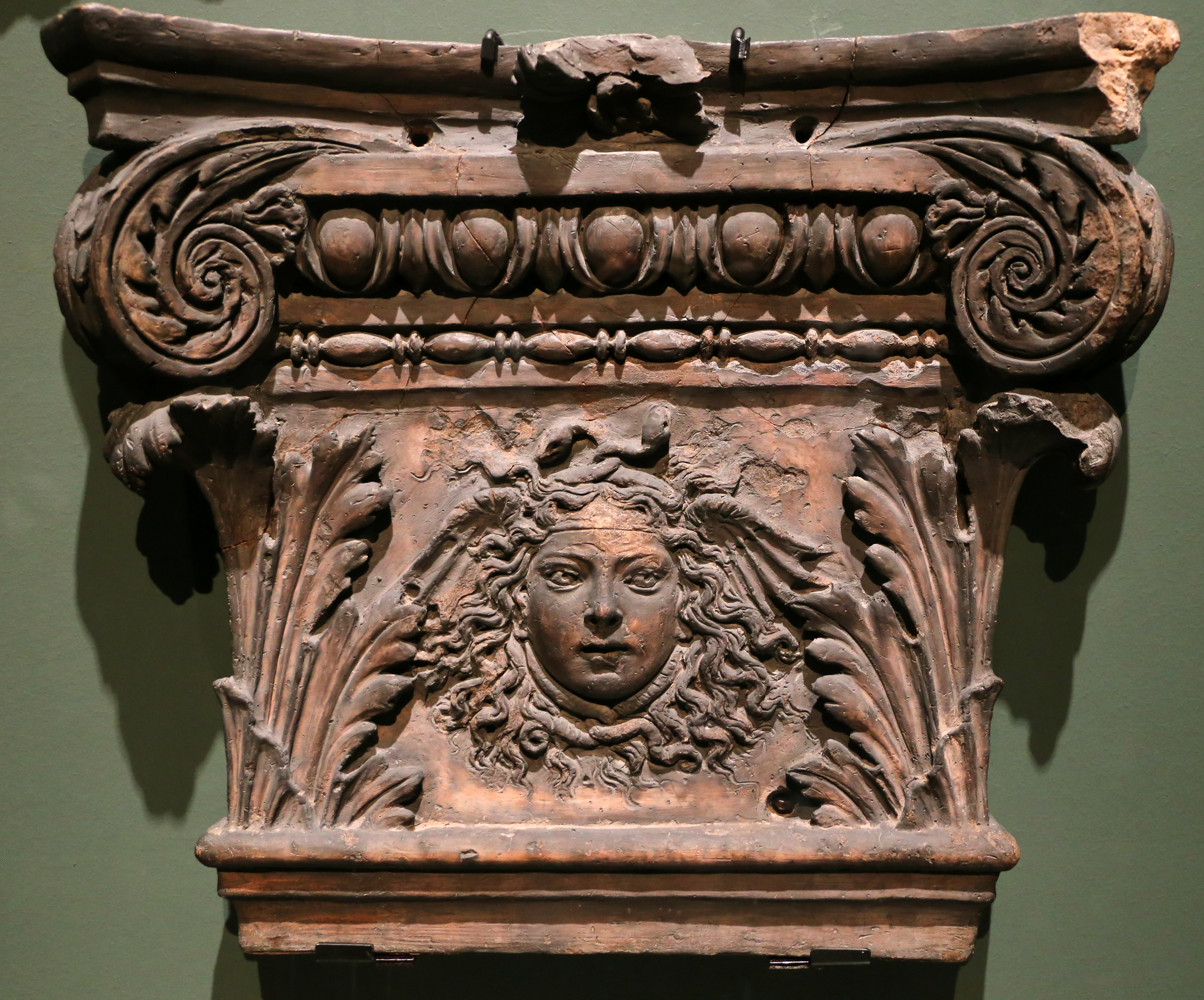
Renaissance Composite pilaster capital with a gorgon mascaron, by a Florentine pupil of Verrocchio active in Rome, perhaps Michele Marini da Fiesole, c.1485–1495, terracotta, Museo di Roma, Rome

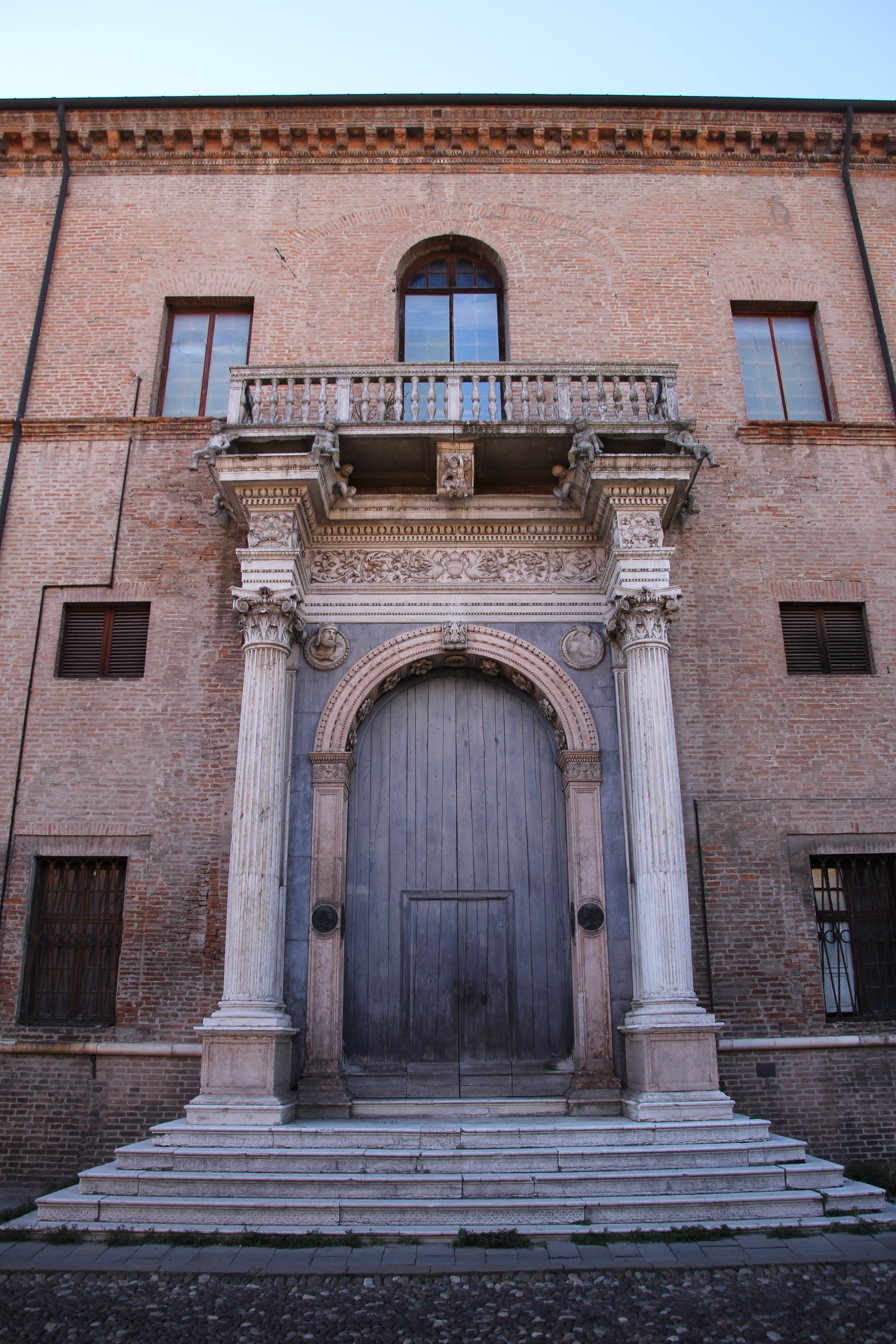
Renaissance Composite columns of the Palazzo Prosperi-Sacrati, Ferrara, Italy, by Biagio Rossetti, 1493–1514

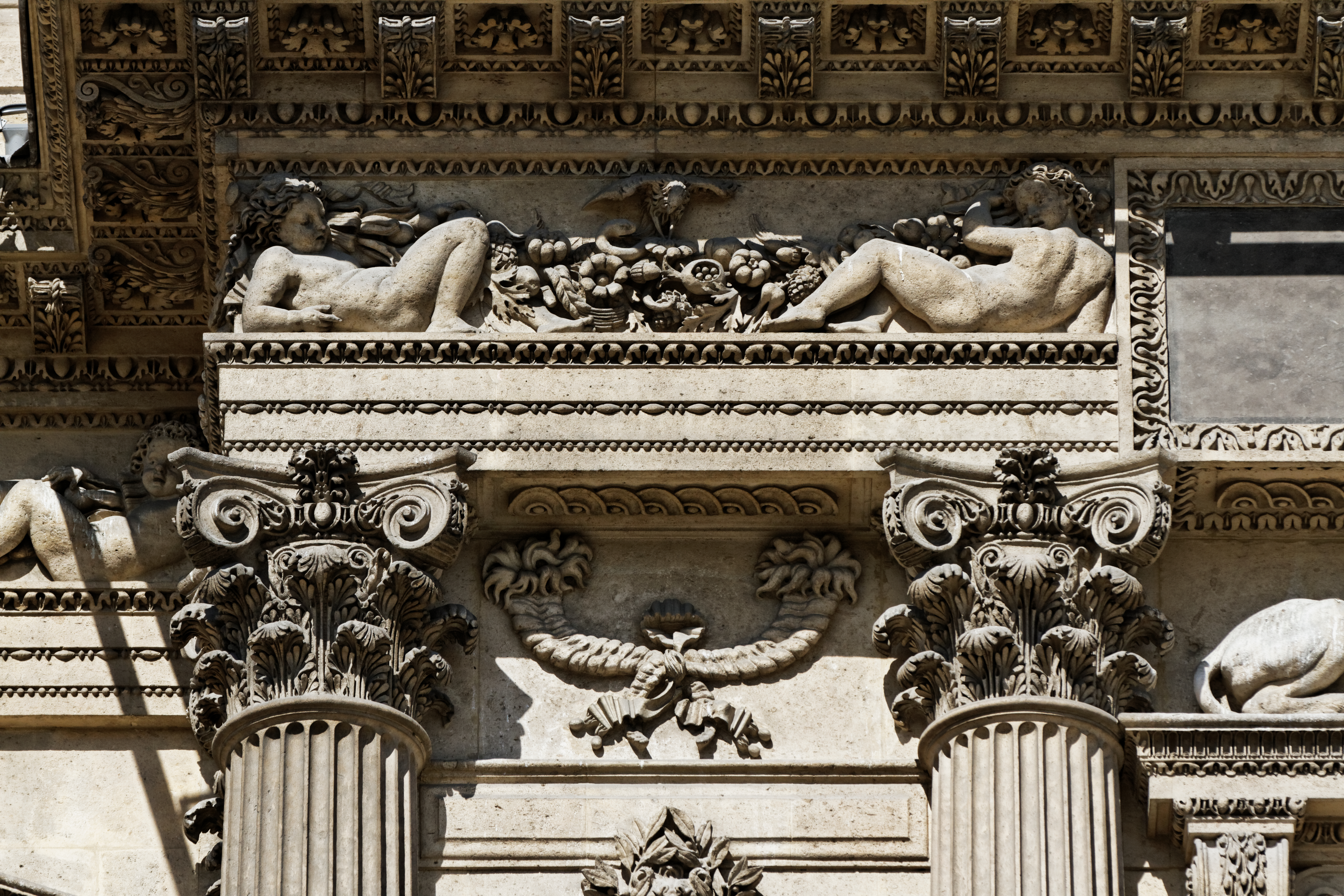
Renaissance Composite capitals of the Lescot Wing of the Louvre Palace, Paris, by Pierre Lescot, 1546–1551

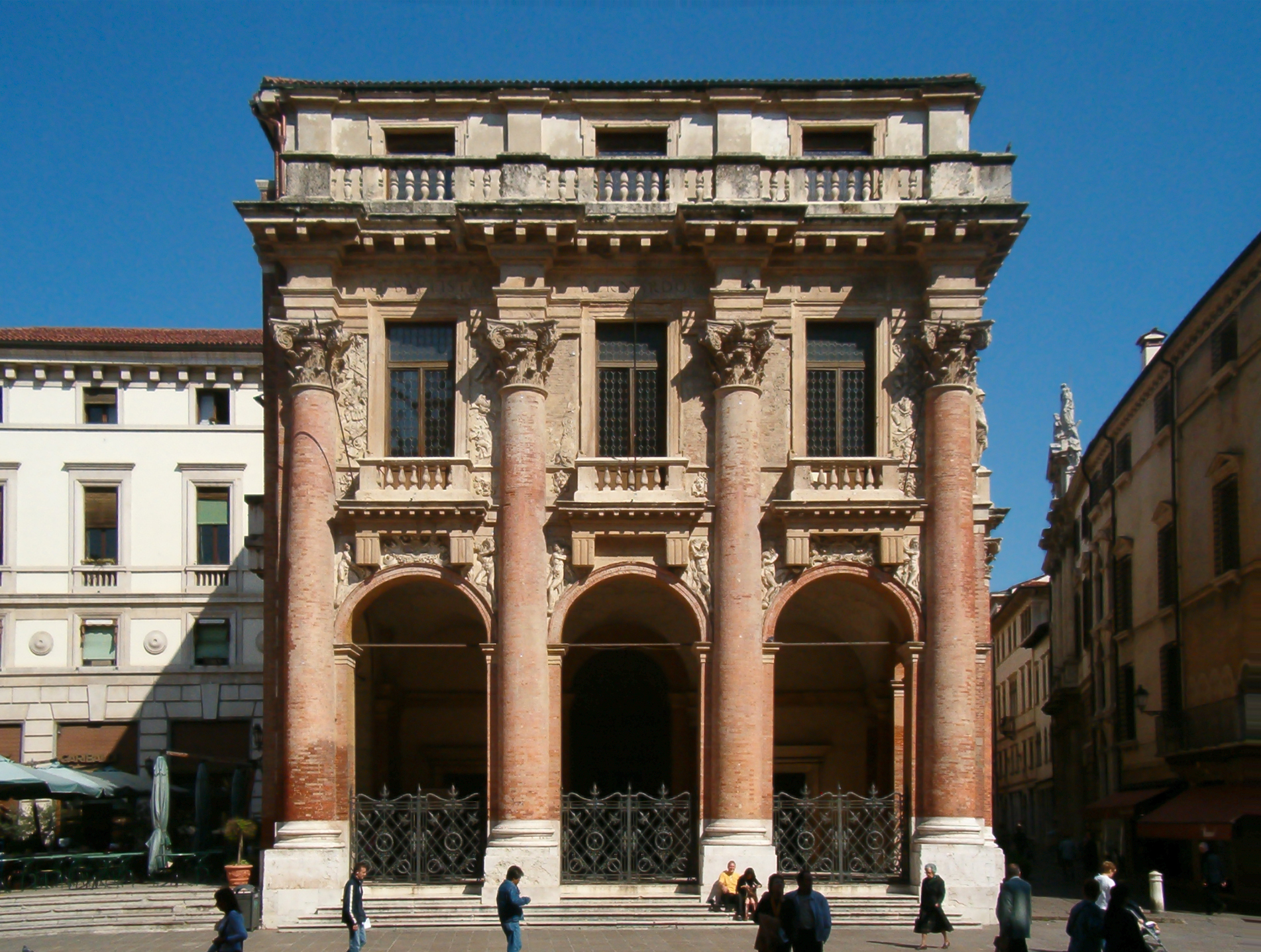
Renaissance Composite columns of the Palazzo del Capitaniato, Vicenza, Italy, by Andrea Palladio, designed in 1565 and built in 1571–1572

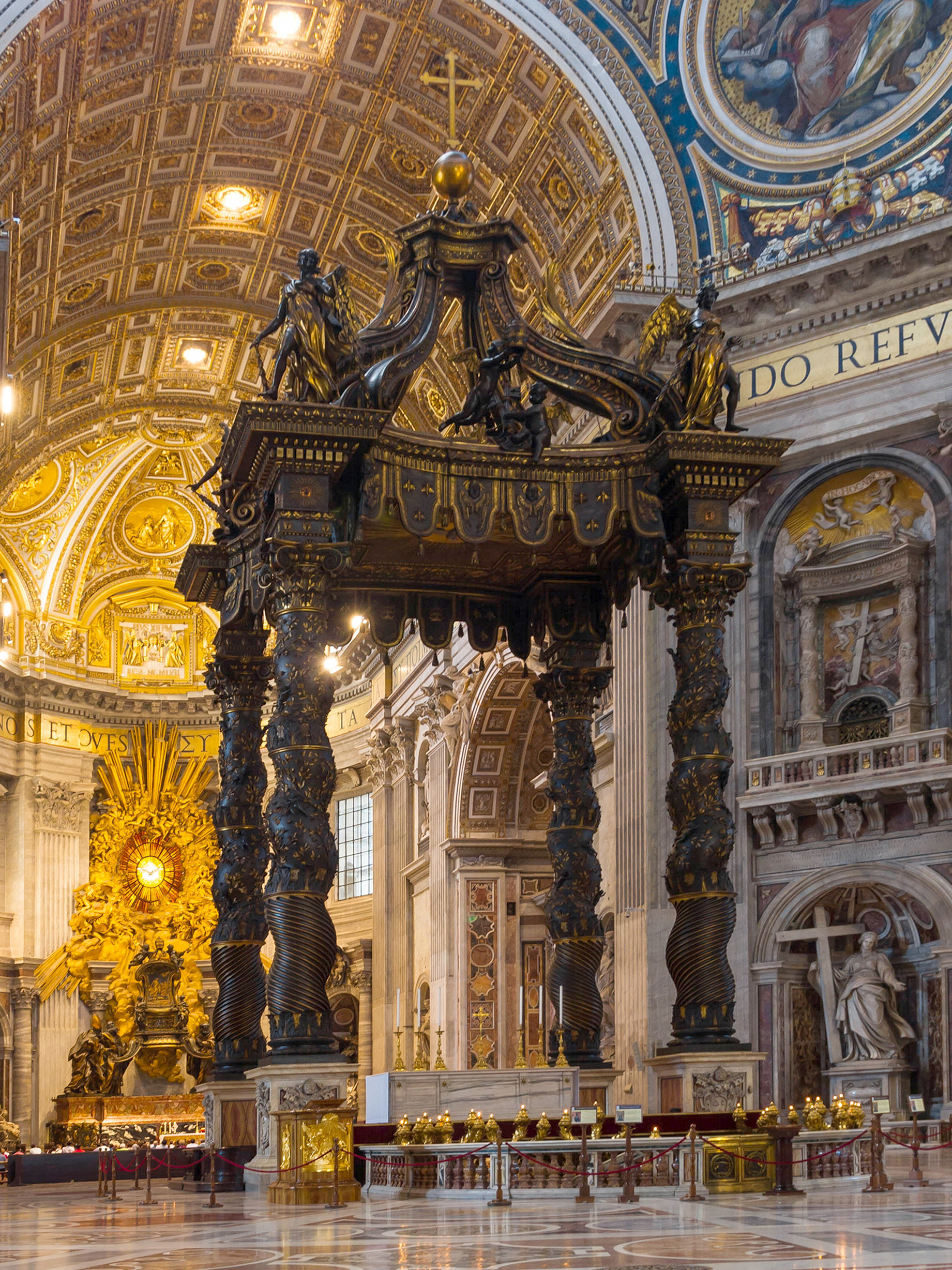
Baroque Solomonic Composite columns of St. Peter's Baldachin, St. Peter's Basilica, Vatican City, by Gian Lorenzo Bernini, 1623–1634

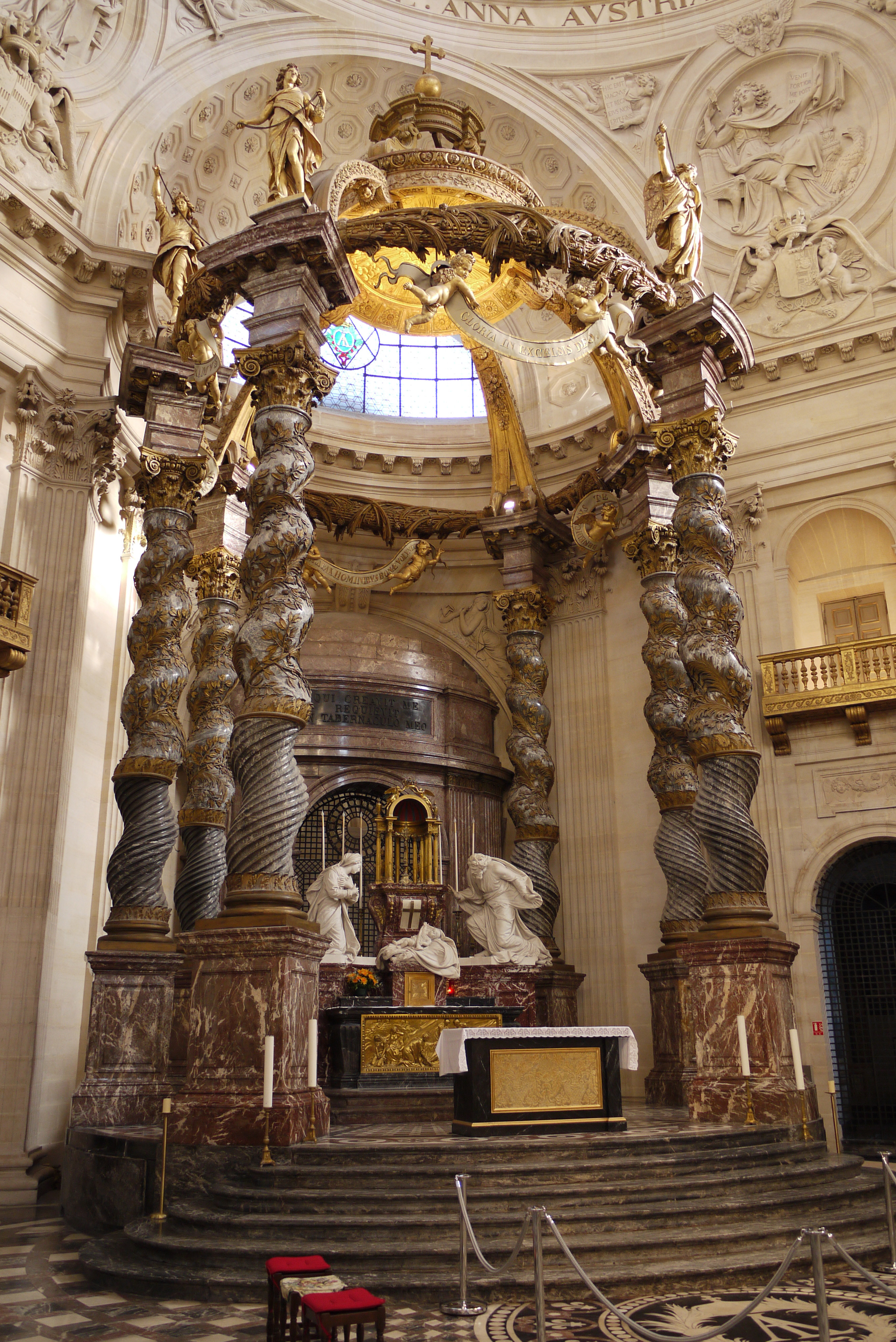
Baroque Solomonic Composite of the baldaquin in the Church of the Val-de-Grâce, Paris, by François Mansart or Gabriel Le Duc, 1634–1667

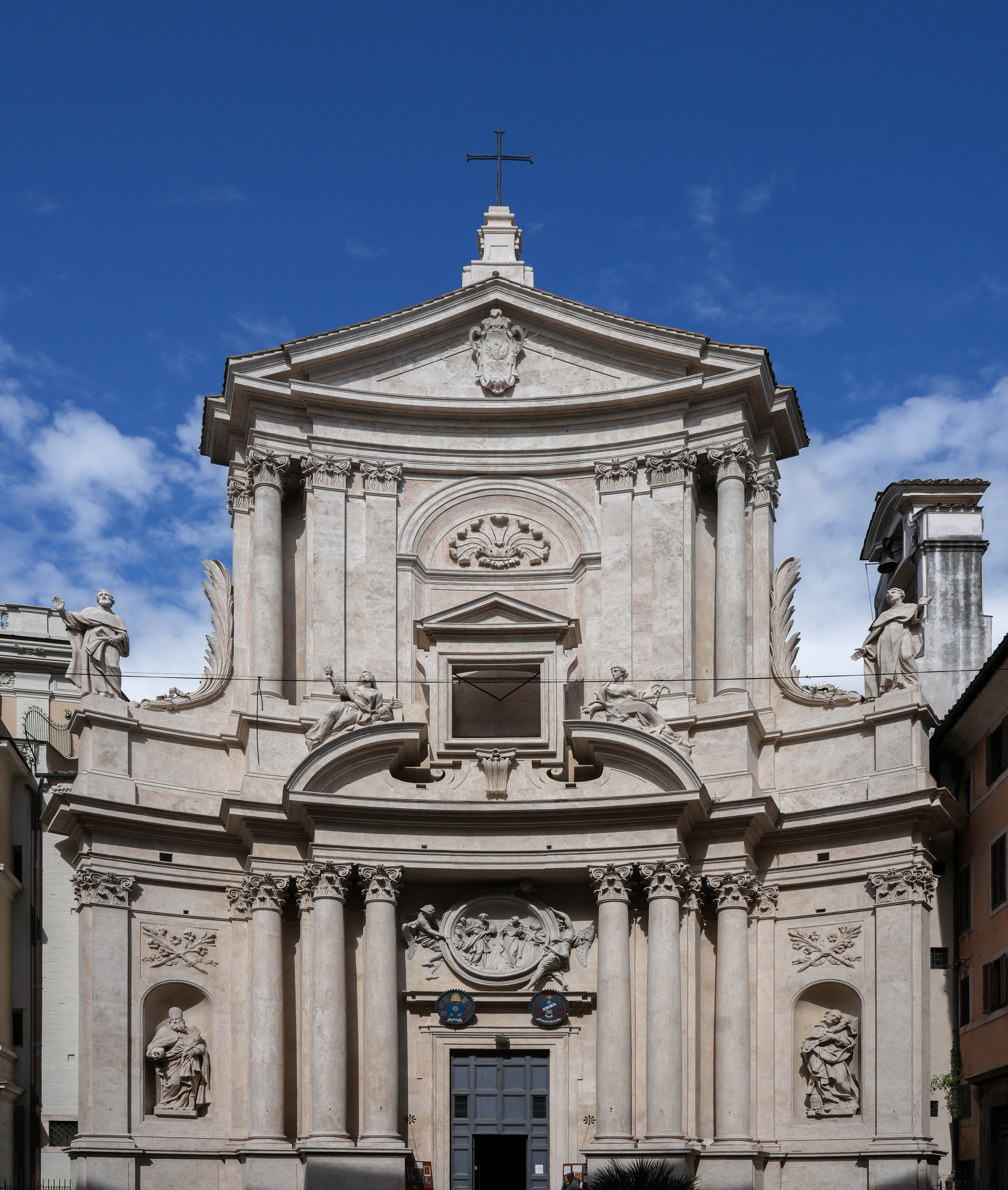
Baroque Composite columns of San Marcello al Corso, Rome, by Carlo Fontana, 1682–1683

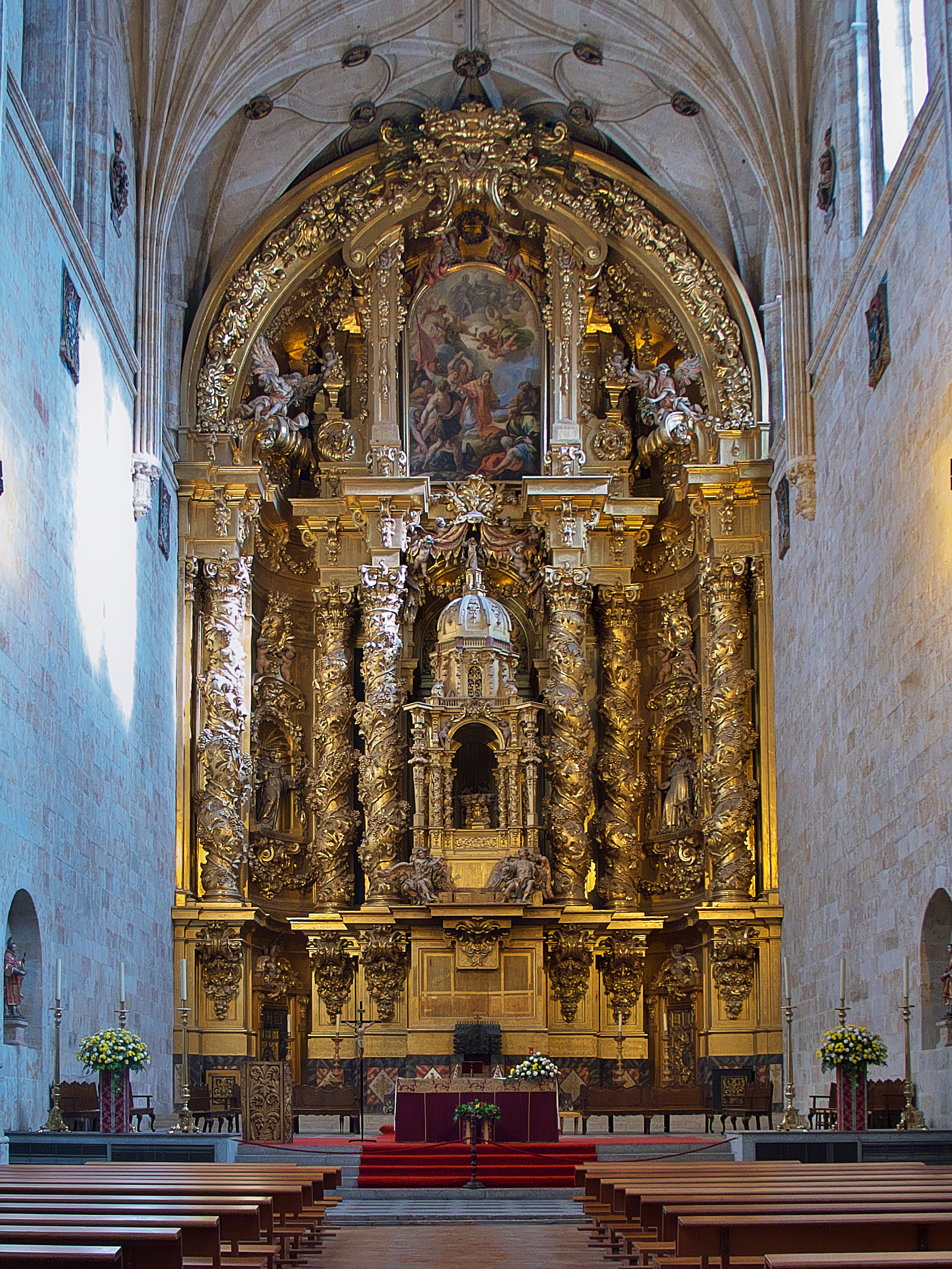
Baroque Solomonic Composite columns of the main altar of the Convento de San Esteban, Salamanca, Spain, by José Benito de Churriguera, 1693

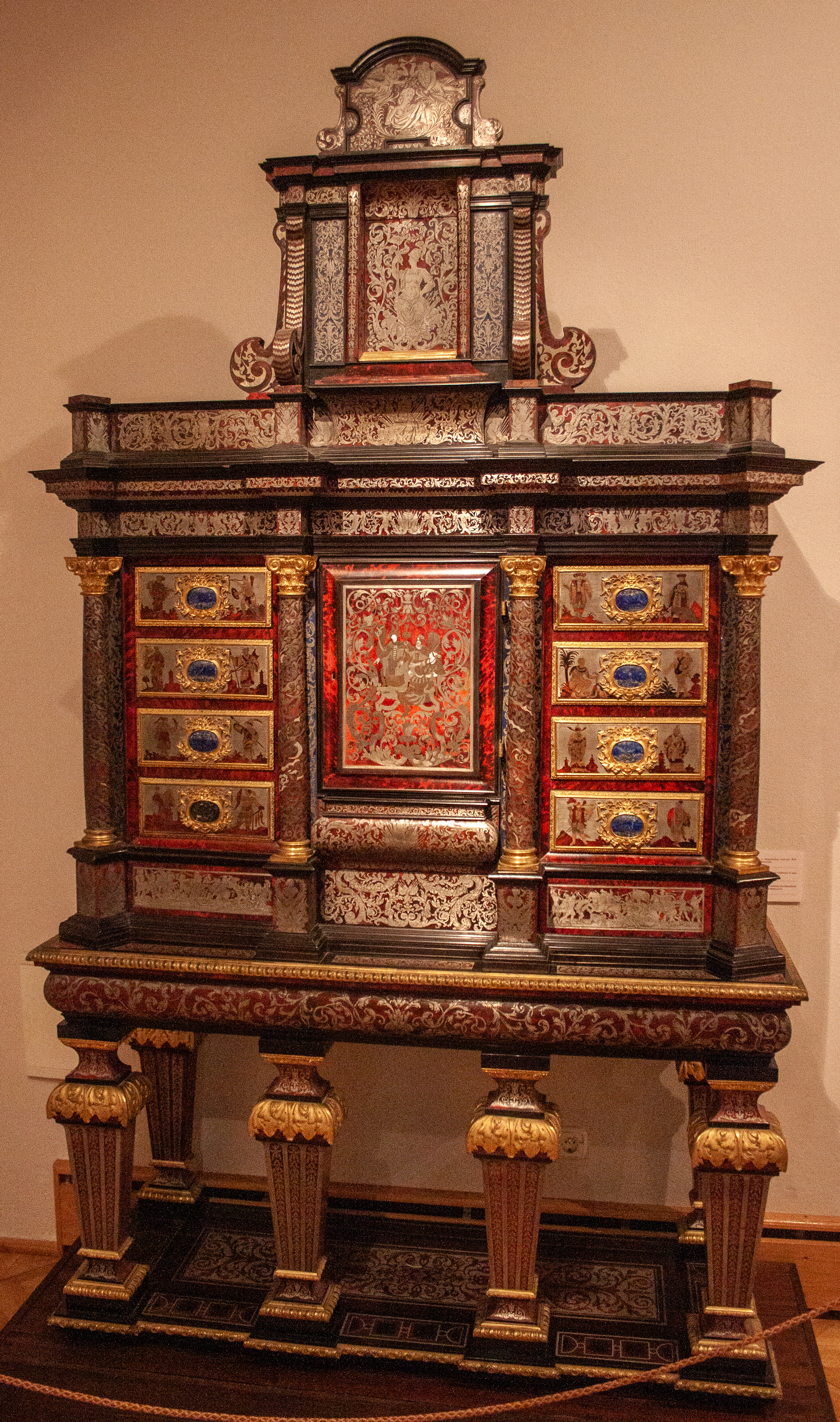
Baroque Composite columns on a cabinet, probably by André-Charles Boulle, 17th century, Boulle work, gilt bronze, lapis lazuli and other materials, Rákóczi Múzeum, Sárospatak, Hungary

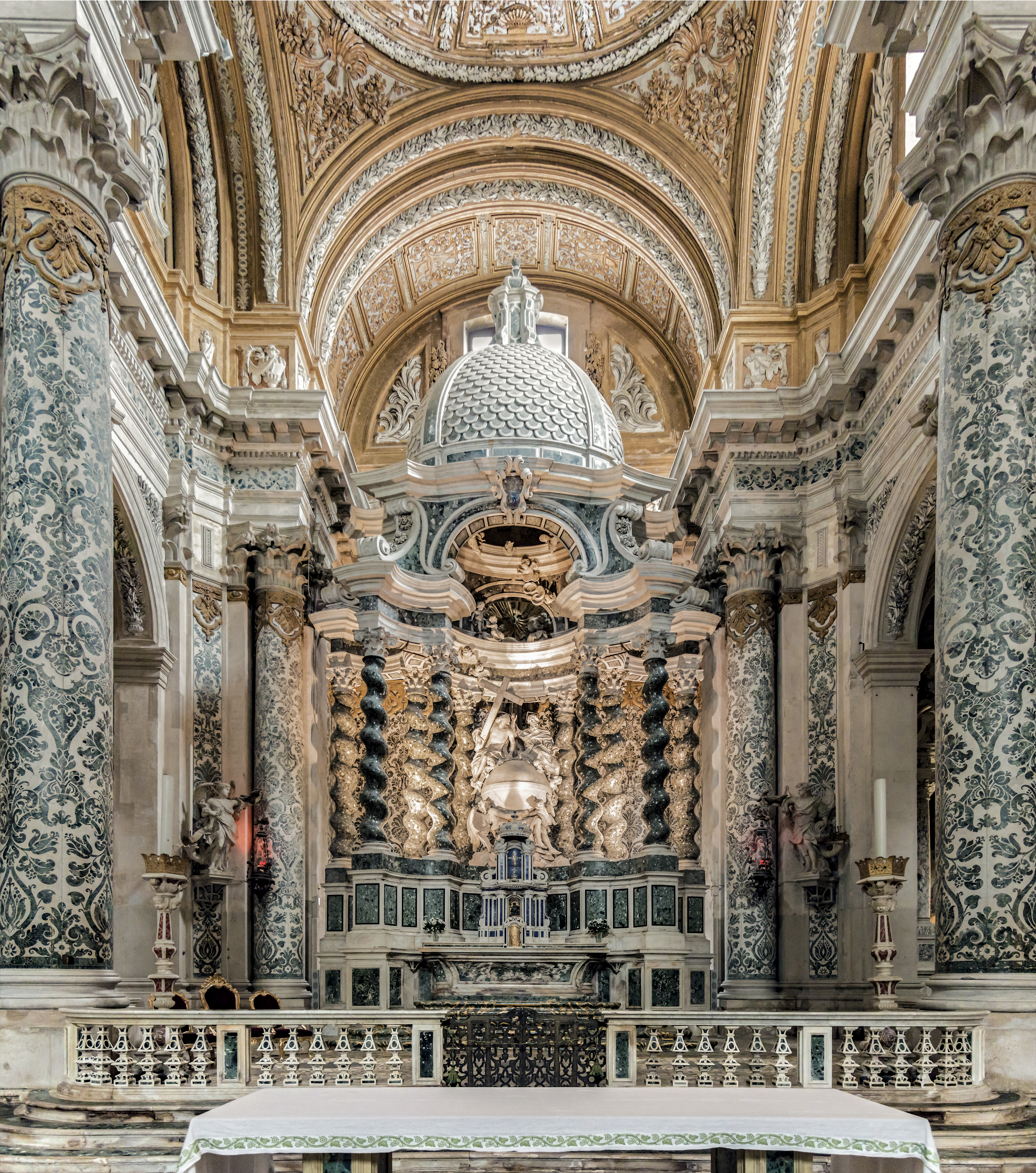
Baroque Solomonic Composite columns of the high altar of the Gesuiti, Venice, Italy, by Jacopo Antonio Pozzo, 1715–1728

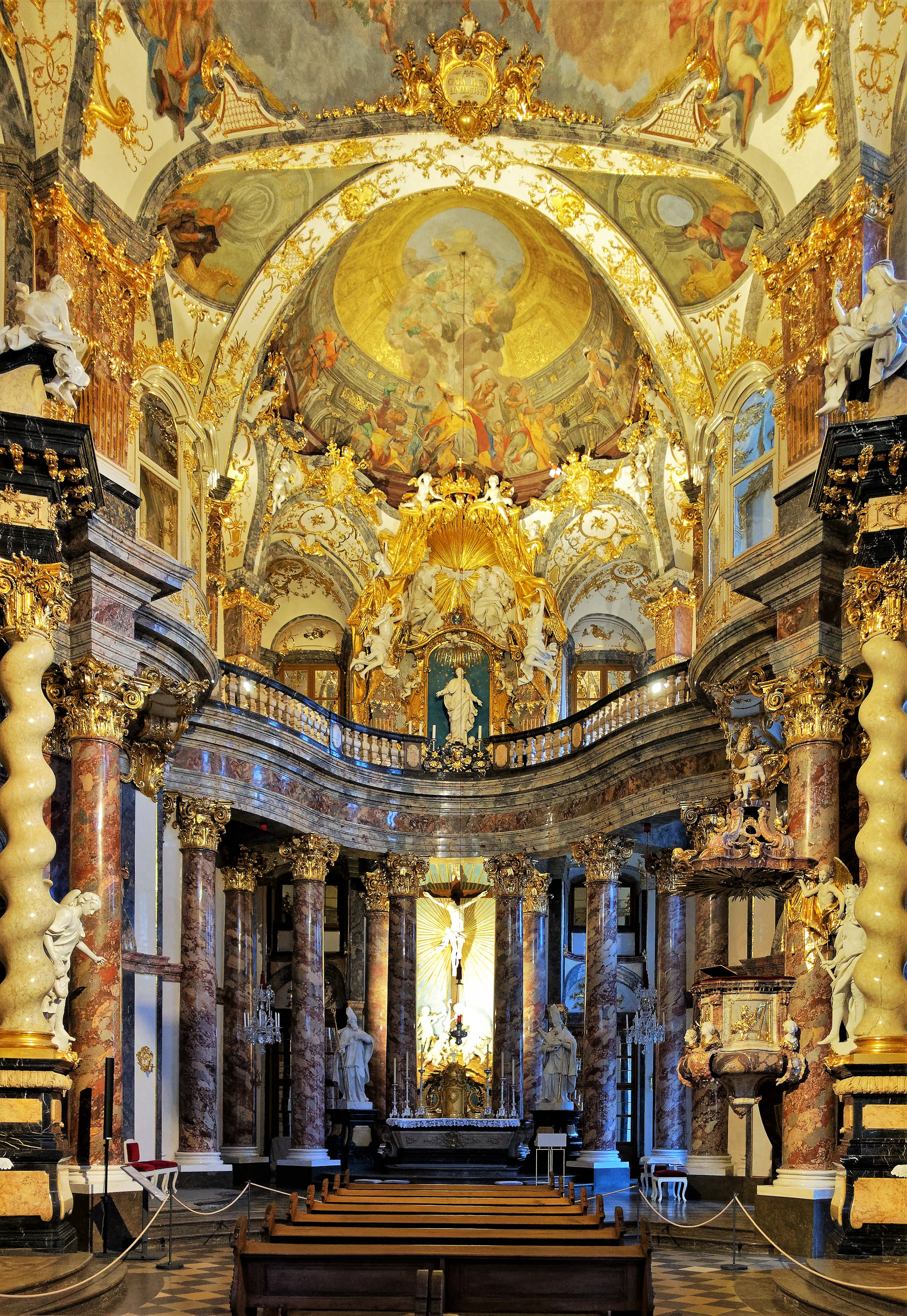
Rococo Composite columns in the chapel of the Würzburg Residence, Würzburg, Germany, by Balthasar Neumann, 1732–1744

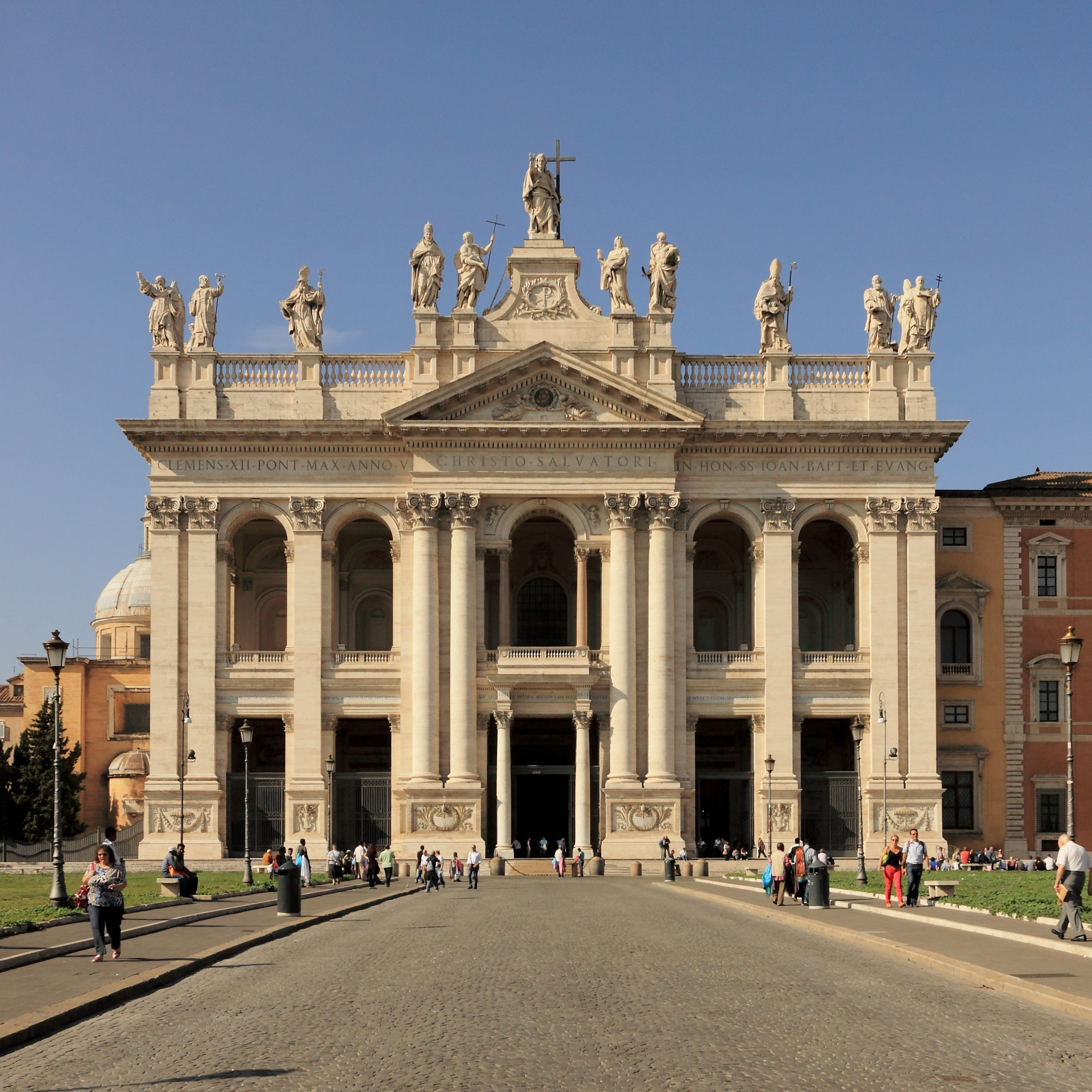
Baroque Composite columns of the Archbasilica of Saint John Lateran, Rome, by Alessandro Galilei, 1733–1735

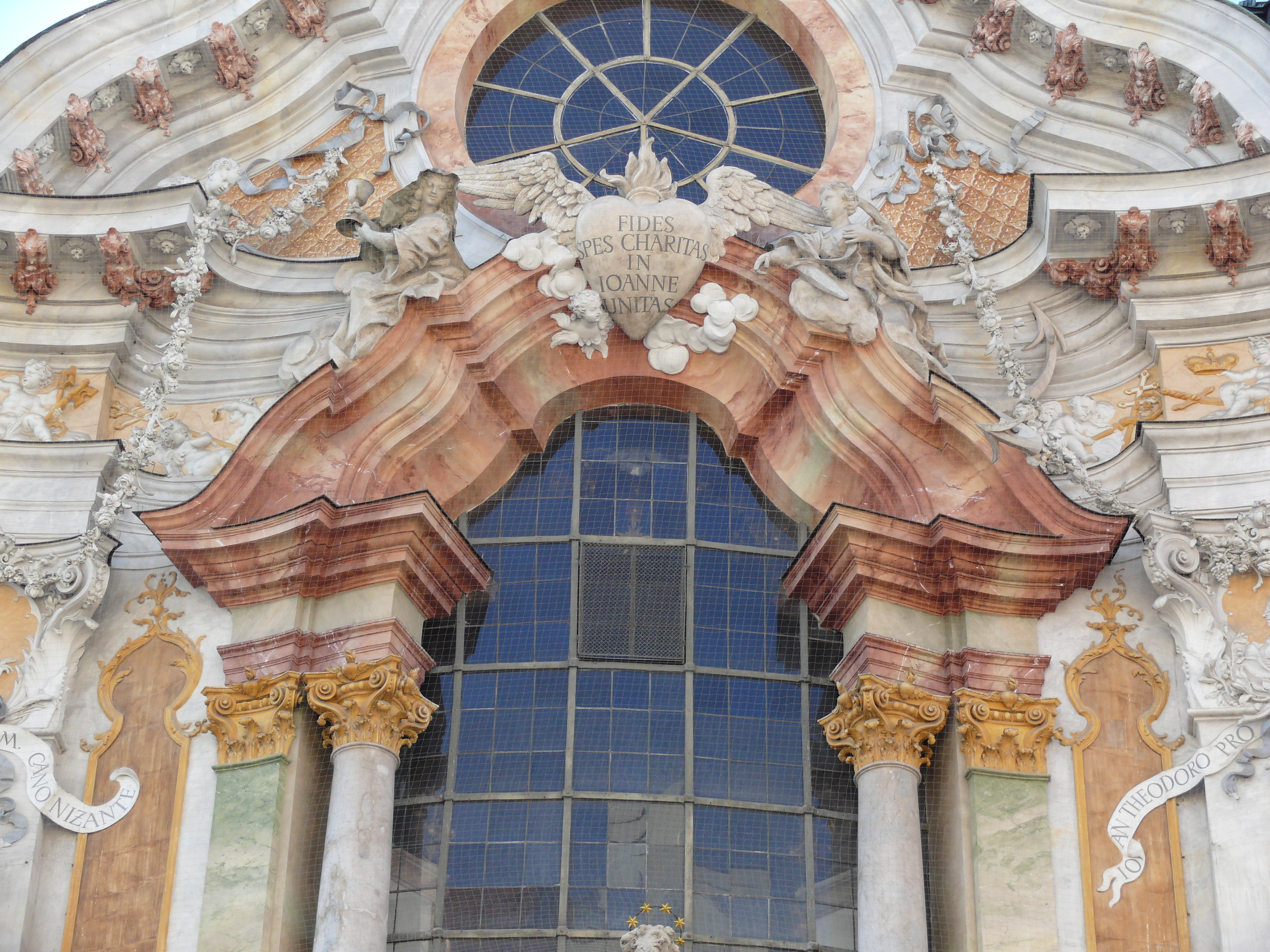
Rococo Composite column and pilaster capitals of the St. Johann Nepomuk, Munich, Germany, by Egid Quirin Asam and Cosmas Damian Asam, 1733–1746

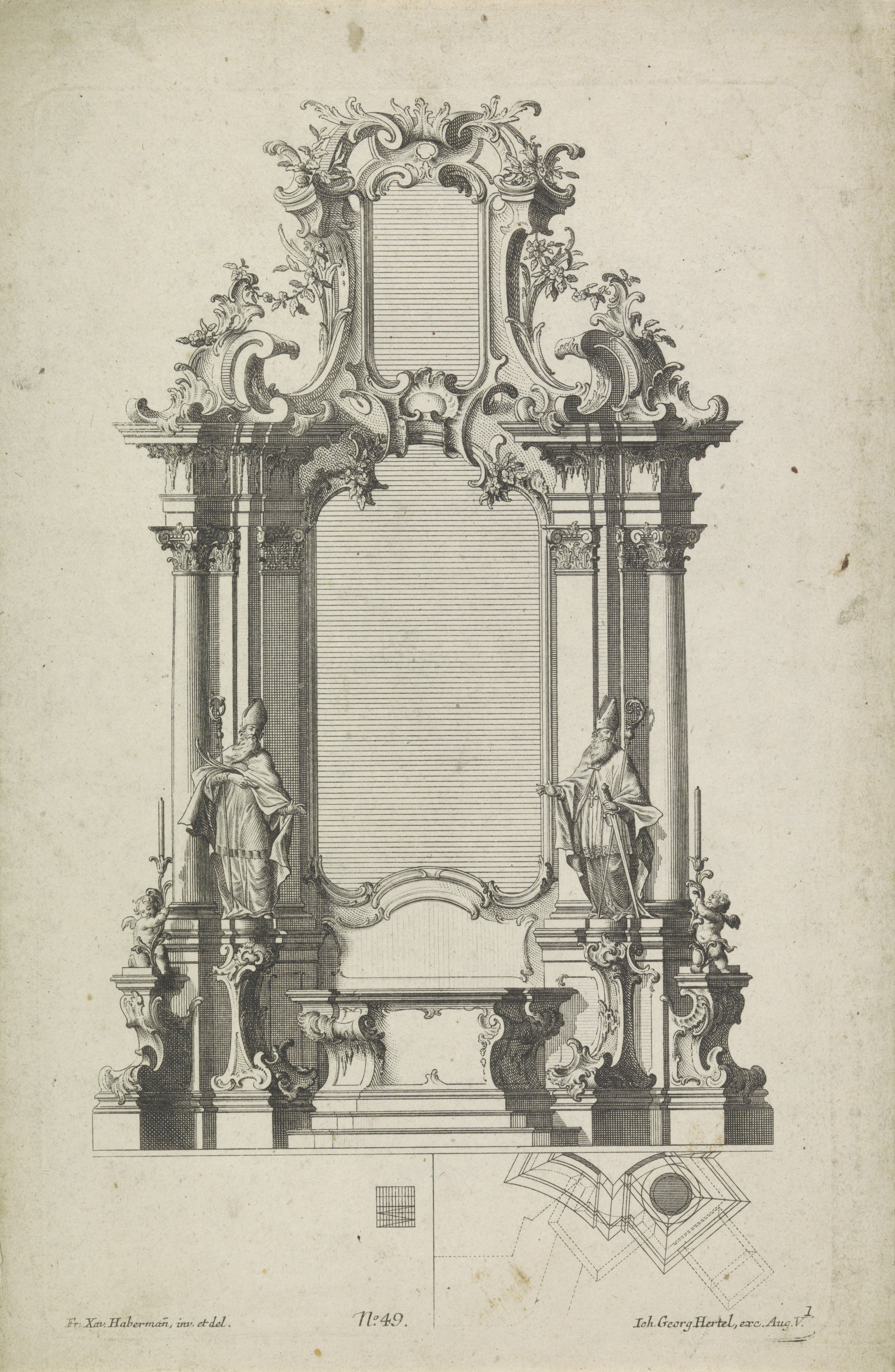
Rococo reinterpretation of the Composite order of an altar design with bishops, with more curvy and sinuous S-shaped acanthuses, by Franz Xaver Habermann, 1740–1745, etching on paper, Rijksmuseum, Amsterdam, the Netherlands

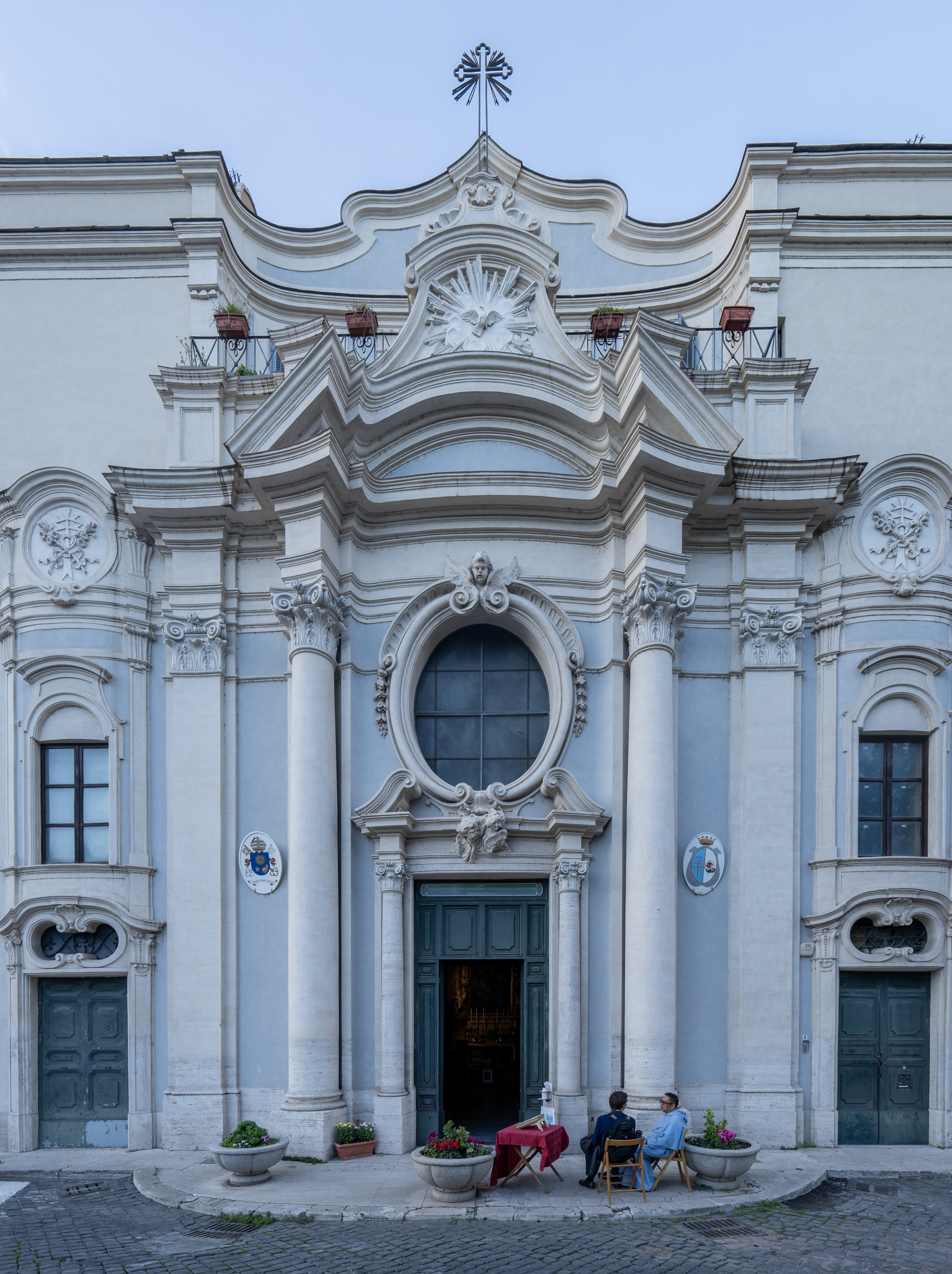
Baroque Composite columns of the Santa Maria Annunziata in Borgo, Rome, by Pietro Passalacqua, 1742 and 1745

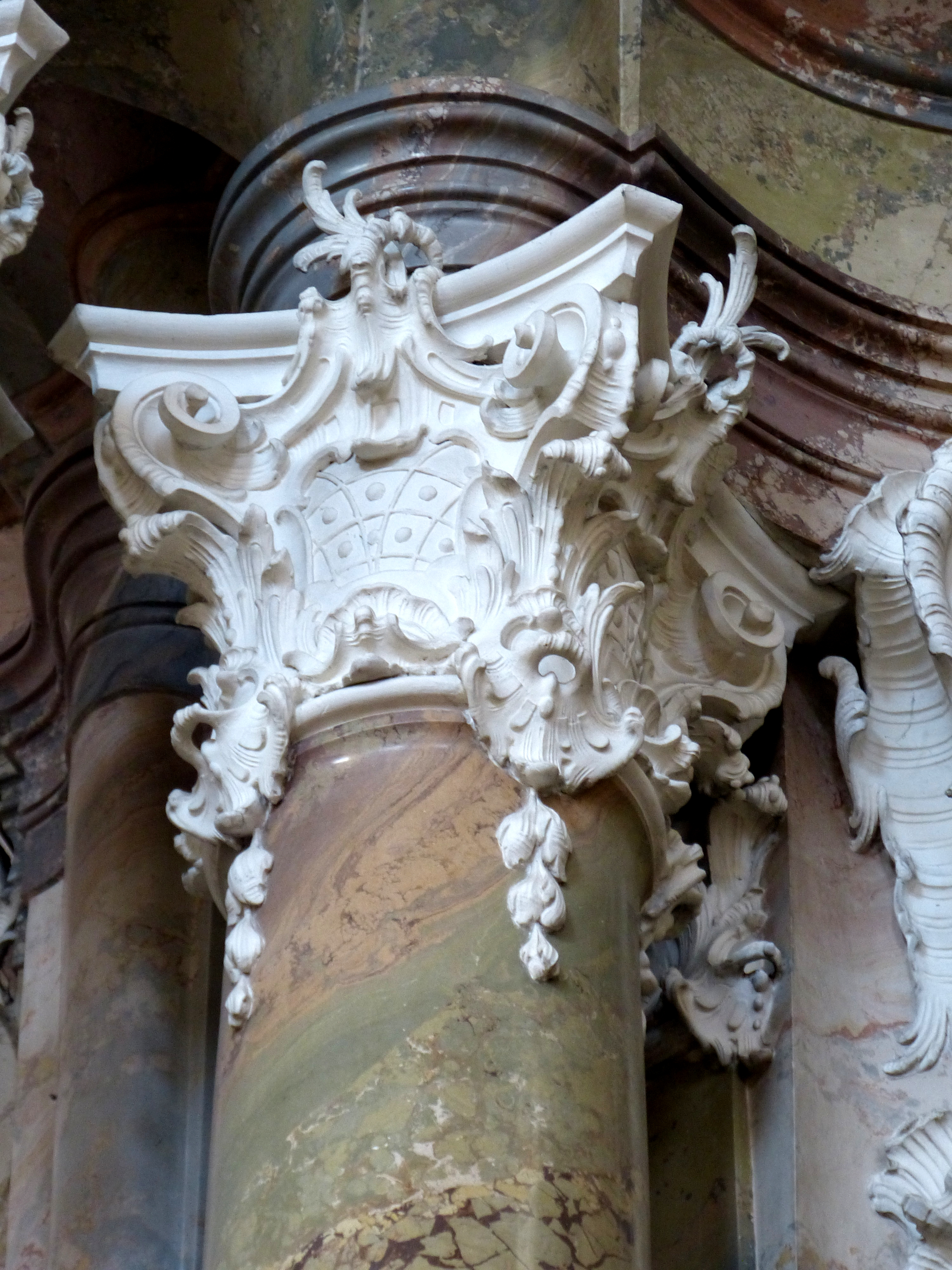
Rococo reinterpretation of the Composite capital of the Engelszell Abbey, Austria, by Johann Georg Üblhör, 1754–1764

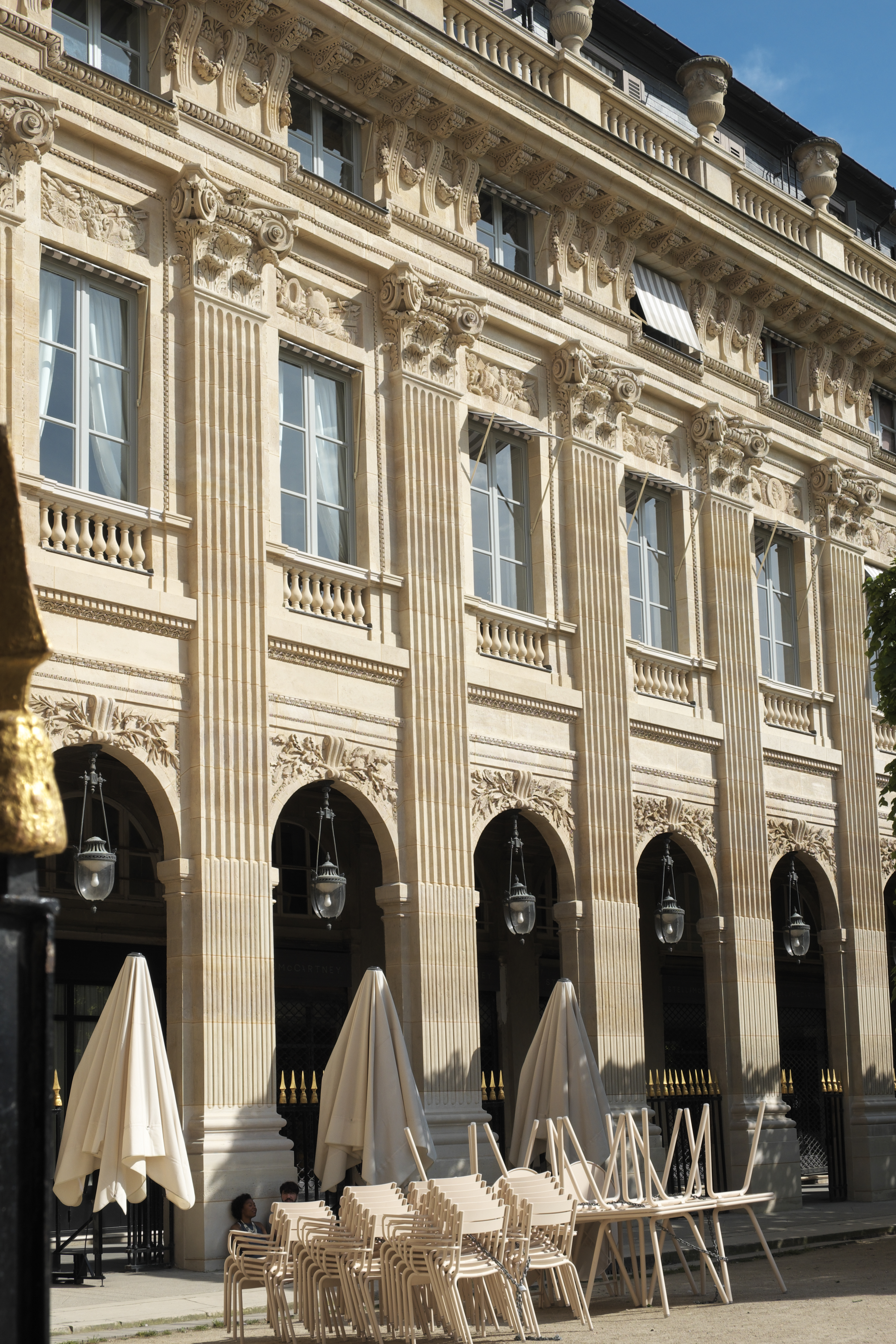
Louis XVI style Composite pilasters on a façade of the Galerie de Valois, Palais-Royal, Paris, by Victor Louis, 1780

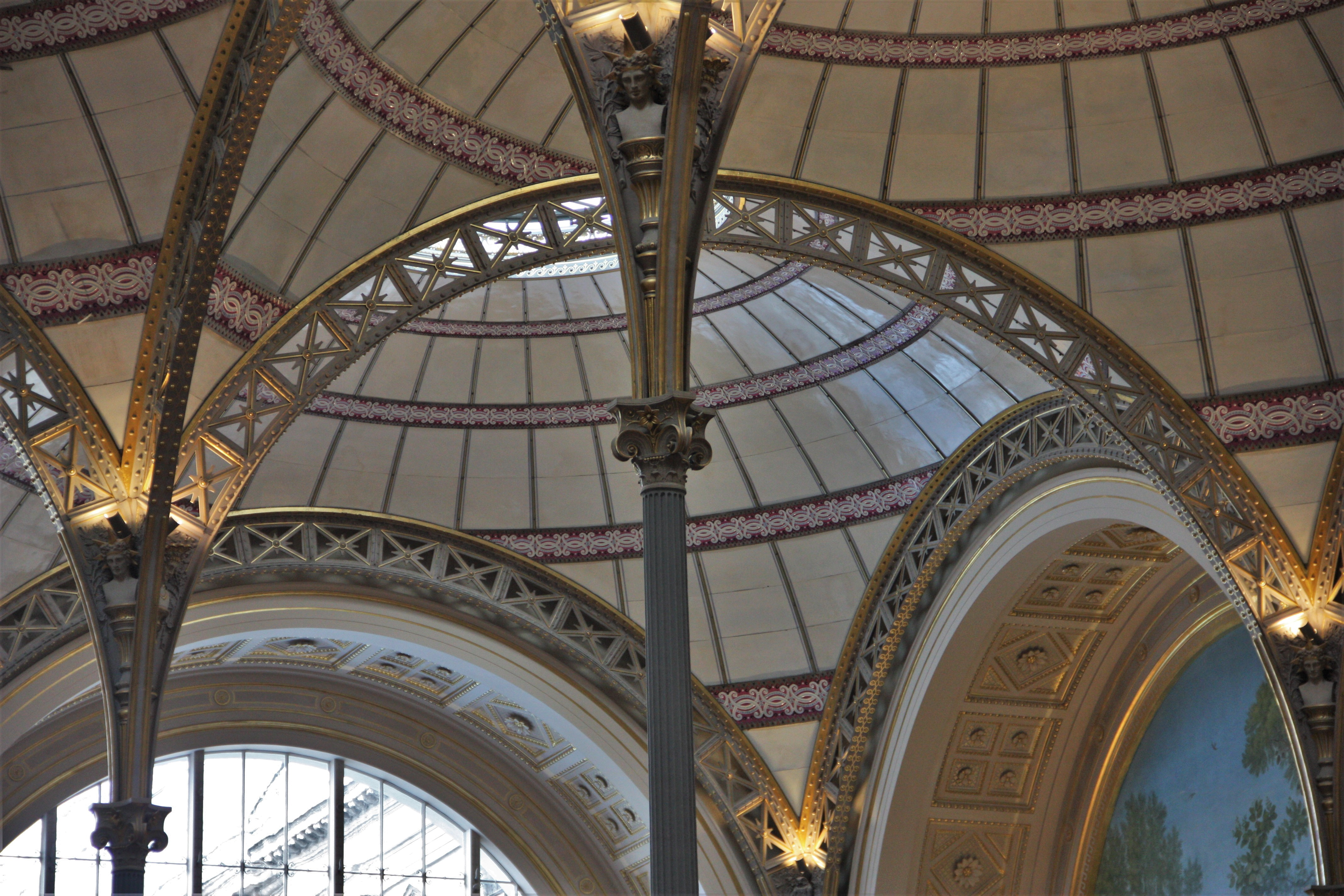
Neoclassical stylized Composite columns in a reading room in the Bibliothèque nationale de France on Rue de Richelieu, Paris, by Henri Labrouste, 1859-1868

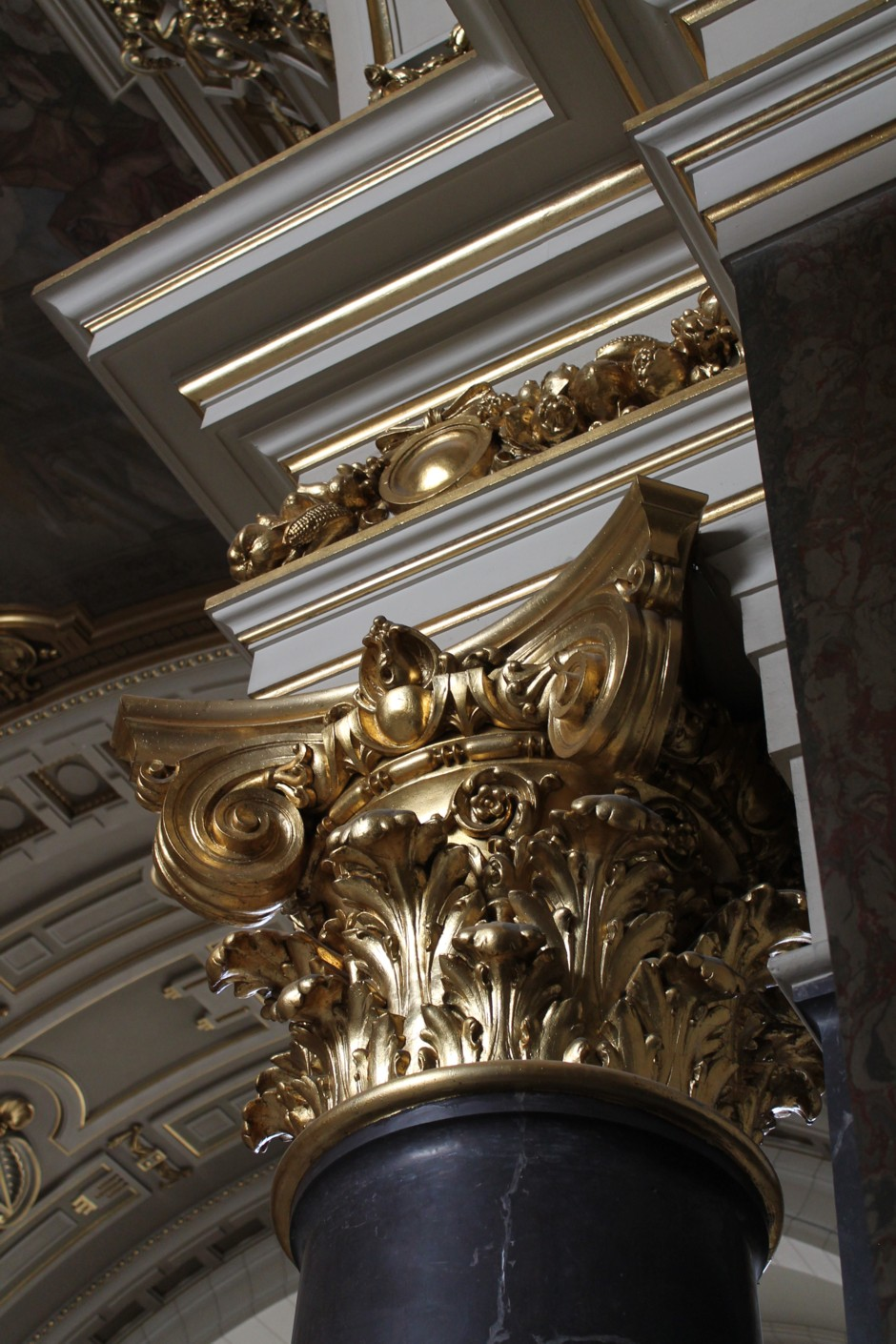
Baroque Revival composite capital in the former Palace of Justice, Budapest, Hungary, by Alajos Hauszmann, 1893–1896

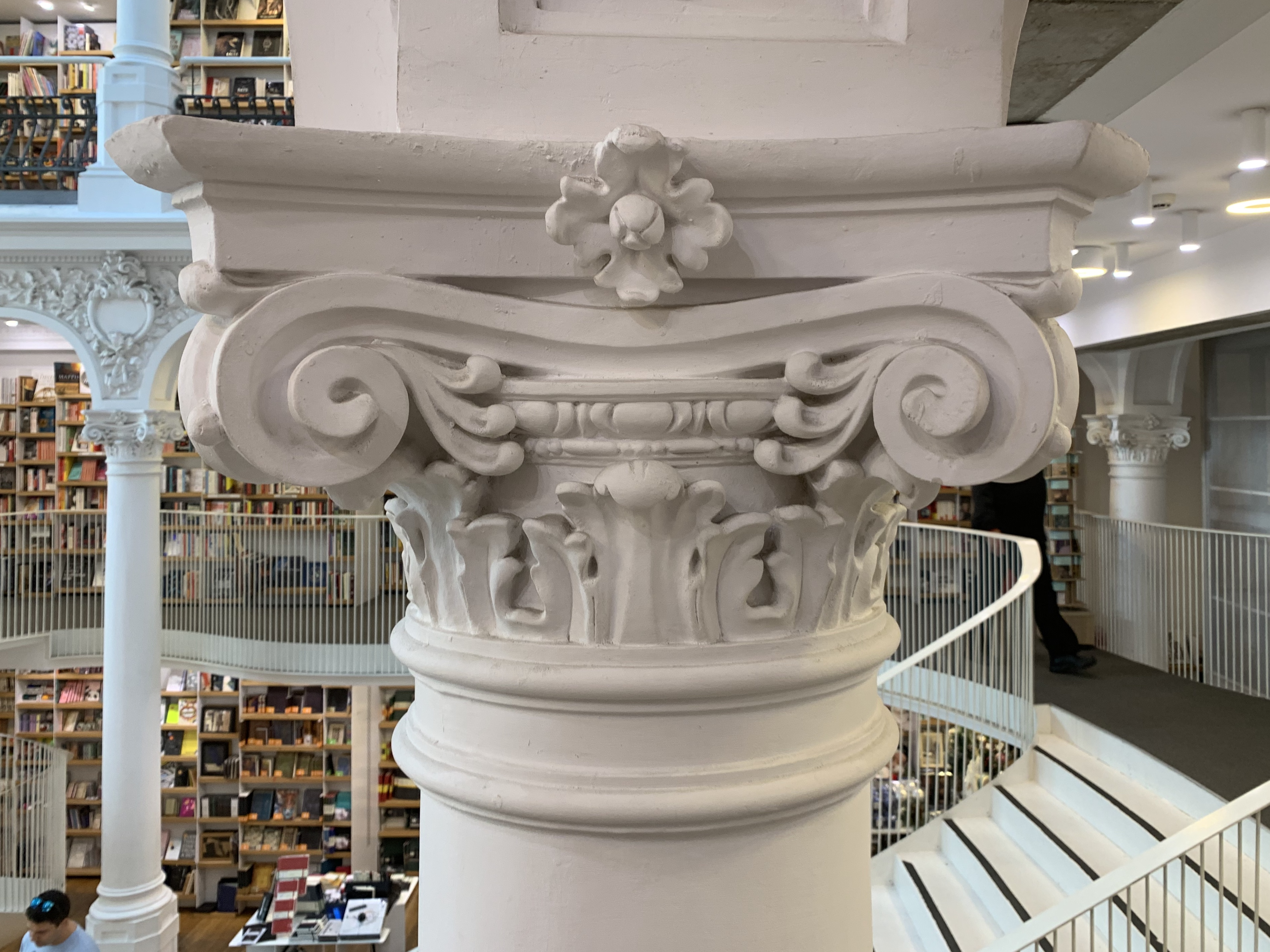
Beaux Arts Composite capital of a column from Cărturești Carusel (Strada Lipscani no. 55), Bucharest, Romania, unknown architect, c.1900

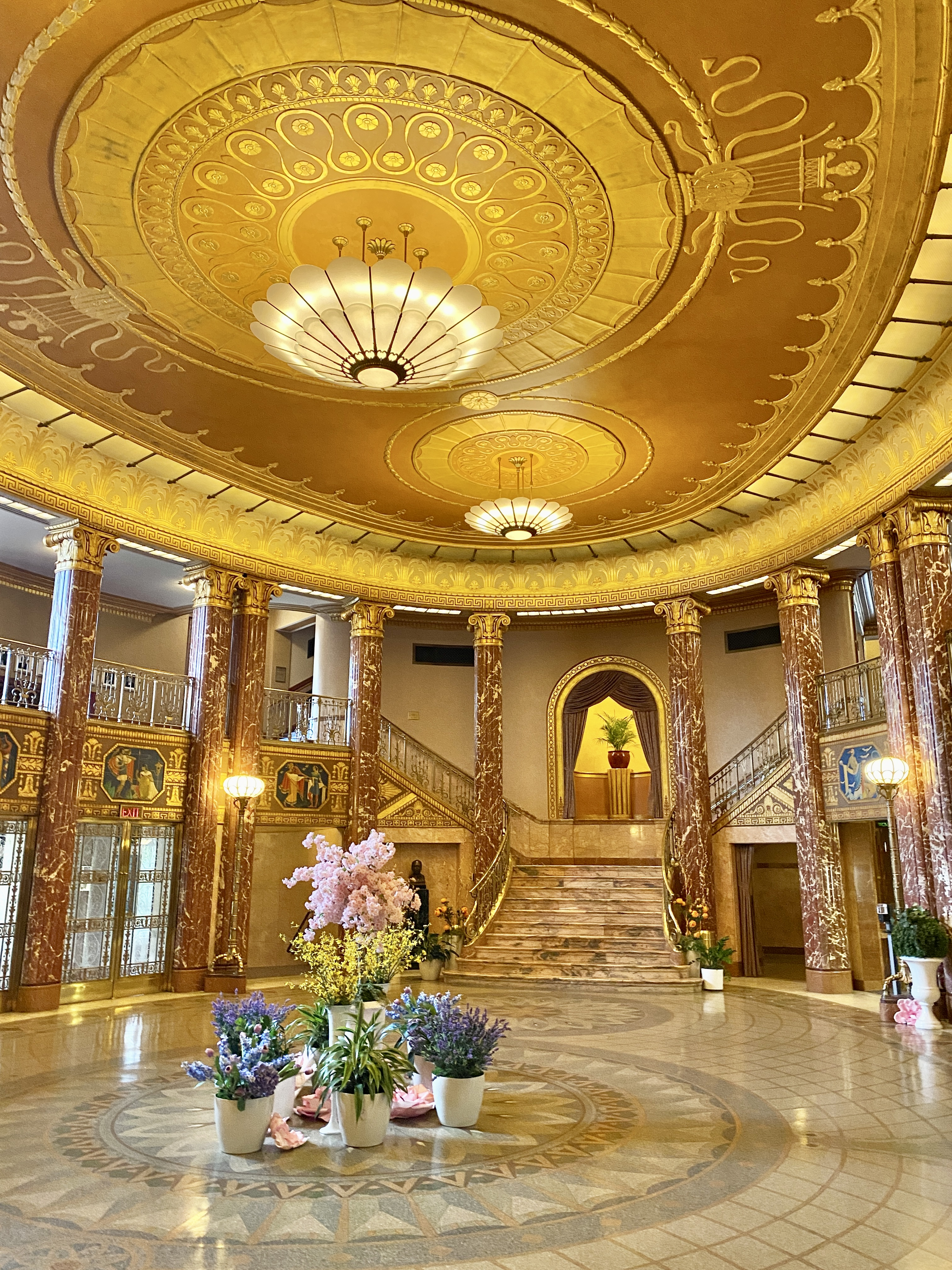
Art Deco Composite columns in the grand foyer of the Severance Hall, Cleveland, US, by Walker and Weeks, 1931

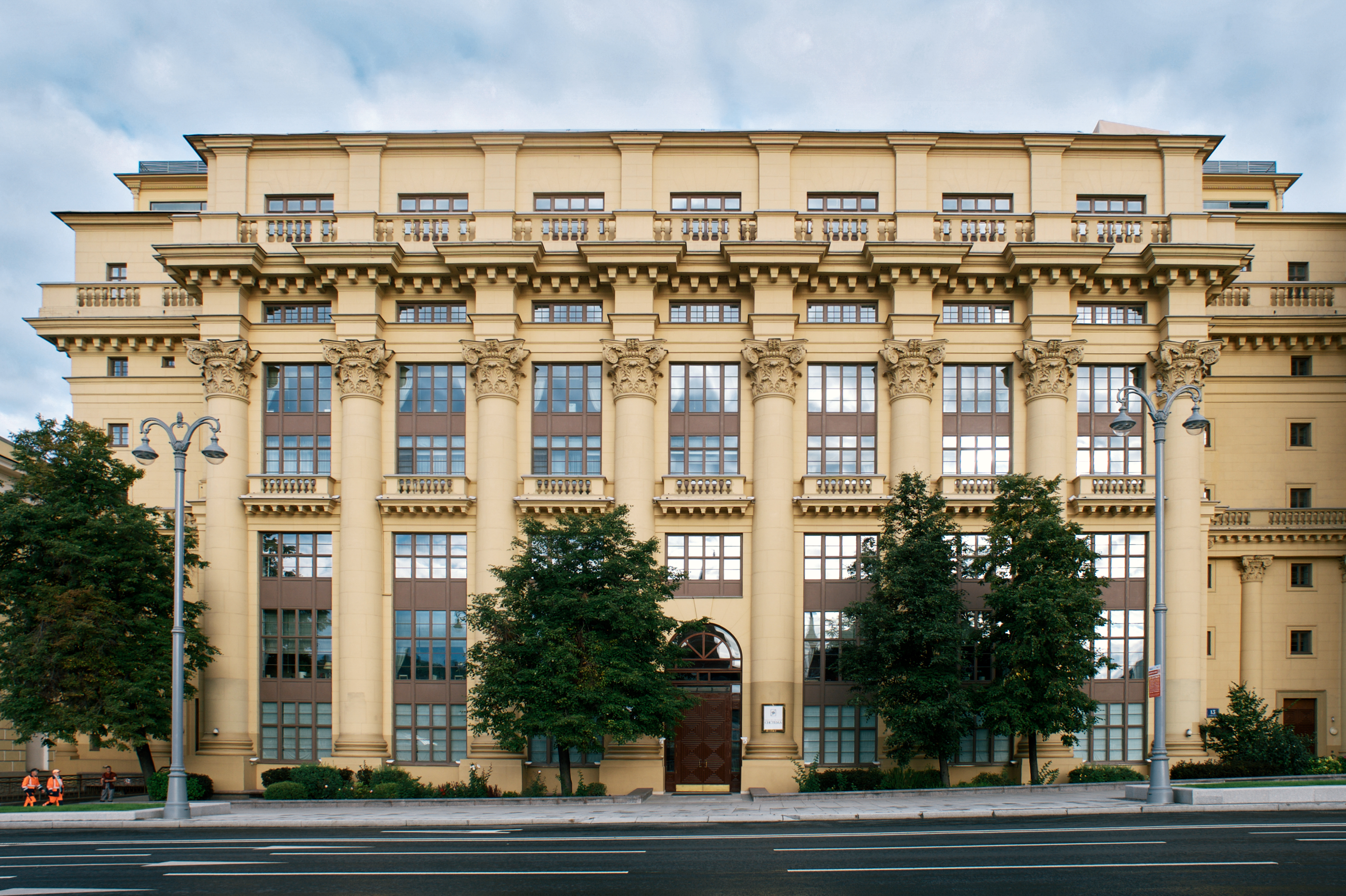
Stalinist Composite columns of the Zholtovsky House, Moscow, by Ivan Zholtovsky, 1932-1934

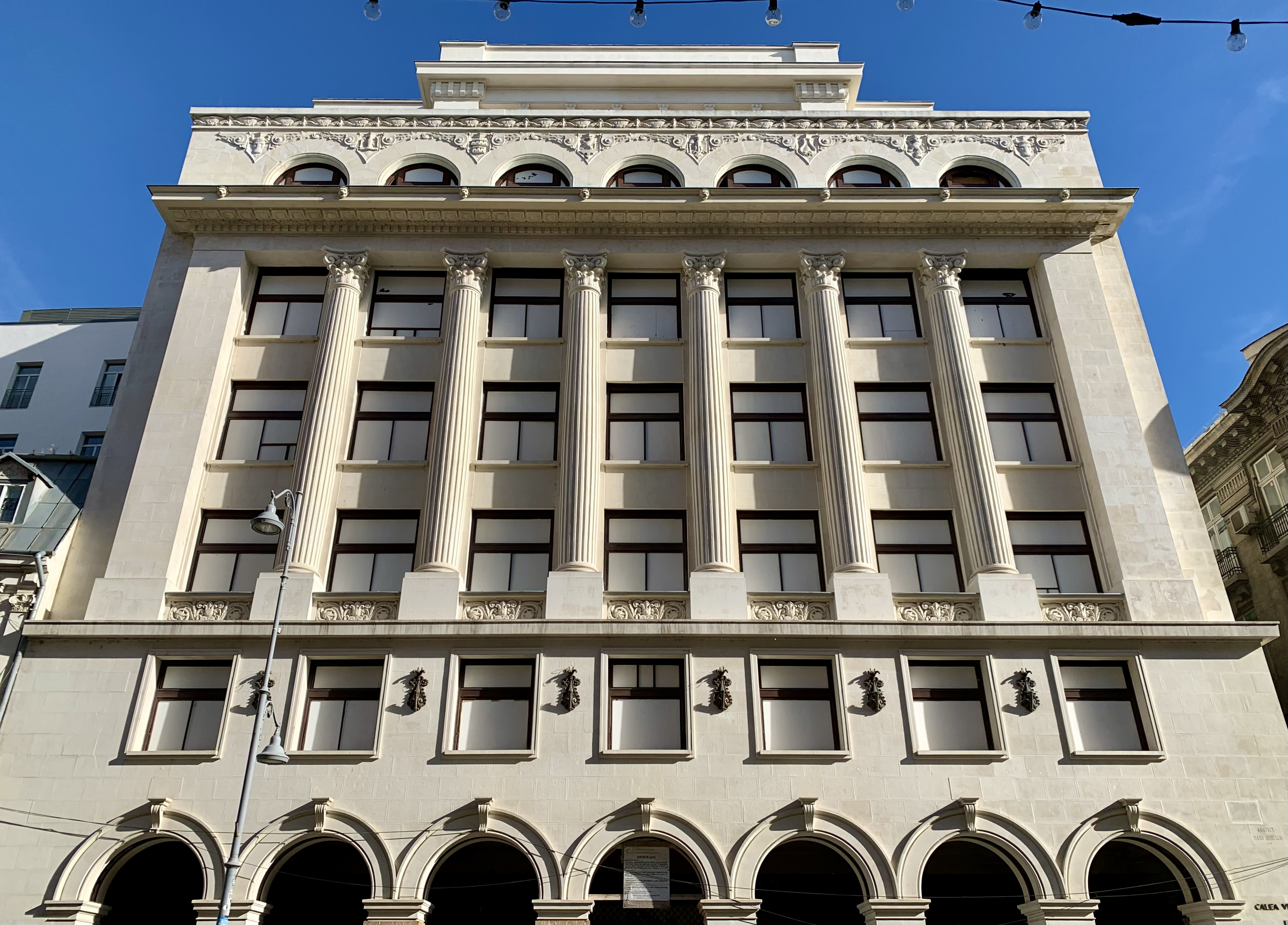
Art Deco Composite columns on the Foreign Trade Bank Building (Calea Victoriei no. 22), Bucharest, by Radu Dudescu, 1937-1938

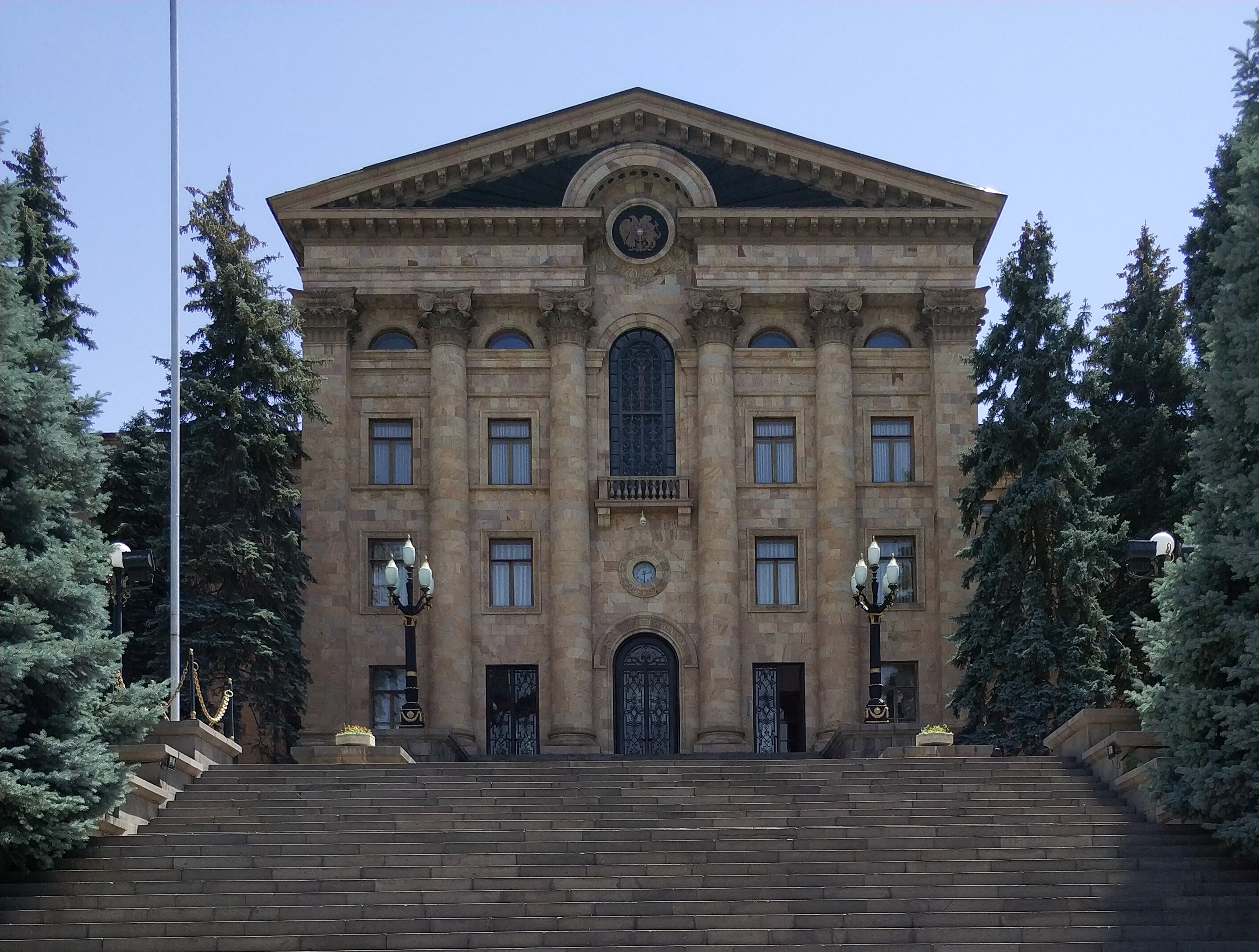
Neoclassical Composite columns and pilasters of the National Assembly Building, Yerevan, Armenia, by Mark Grigorian, 1948–1950

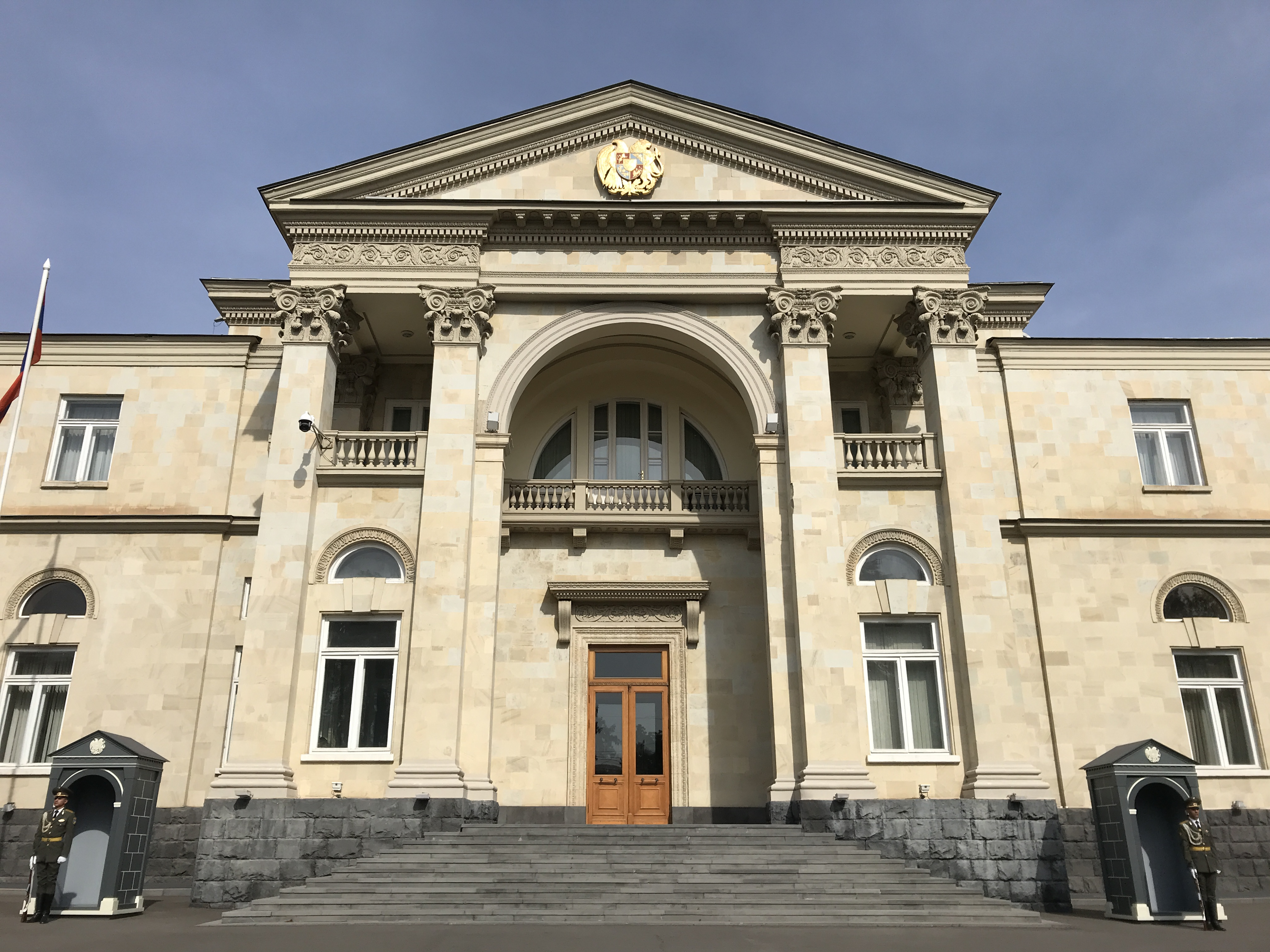
Neoclassical Composite pilasters of the President's Residence, Yerevan, by Mark Grigorian, 1951
