= Radu Dudescu =

Romanian architect

Radu Dudescu (1894 – 1983) was a Romanian architect.

He was born on 10 March (23 March) 1894 in Bucharest, Romania. From 1905 to 1913 he studied at the Matei Basarab High School. He continued his studies at the Bucharest School of Architecture, graduating in 1921.

From 1923 to 1950 he worked as architect for the National Bank of Romania. In 1950 he was transferred to the Design Institute for Constructions. He died in Bucharest in 1983.
