= Krivodol, Bulgaria =

Krivodol Криводол
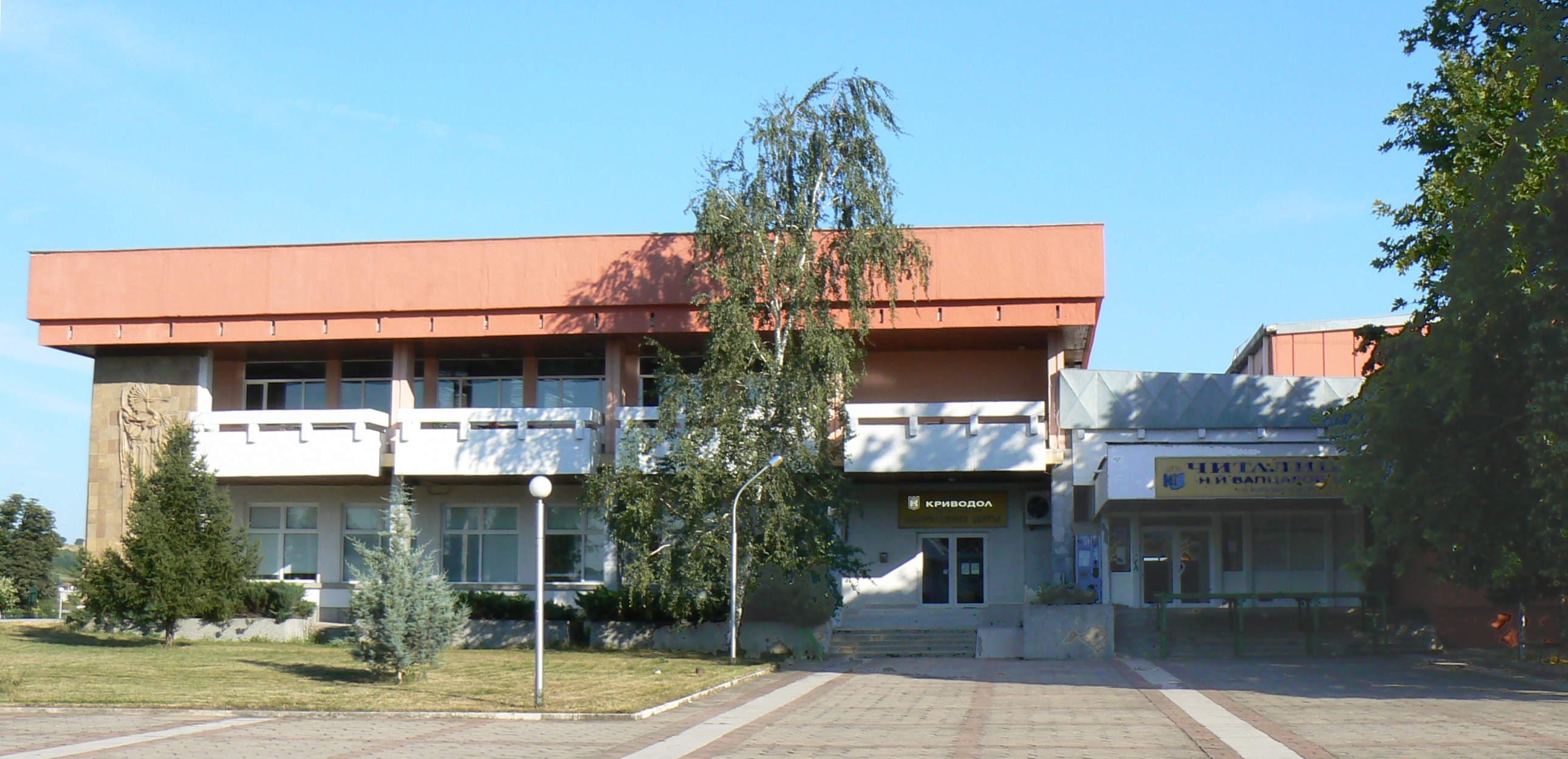

- Location of Krivodol
- Coordinates: 43°22′N 23°29′E
- Country: Bulgaria
- Provinces (Oblast): Vratsa

Government
  - Mayor: Georgi Georgiev
- Elevation: 208 m (682 ft)

Population (2008)
  - Total: 3,497
- Time zone: UTC+2 (EET)
  - Summer (DST): UTC+3 (EEST)
- Postal Code: 3060
- Area code: 09117

Krivodol (Bulgarian: Криводол, pronounced [krivoˈdɔɫ]; "crooked ravine") is a town in northwestern Bulgaria, part of Vratsa Province. It is the administrative centre of Krivodol municipality, which lies in the western part of Vratsa Province, halfway between Vratsa and Montana and 130 kilometres north of Sofia.

In 1880, Krivodol had a population of 982, in the early 20th century 1,117. Following World War II, it had grown to 2,812. The town has a historical museum with an ethnographic collection and an art gallery. Notable natives are Georgi Milchev ("Godzhi"), a bassist with Slavi's Show and singer Nina Nikolina.

== Municipality ==
Krivodol municipality has an area of 326 square kilometres and includes the following 15 places:

- Baurene
- Botunya
- Dobrusha
- Furen
- Galatin
- Glavatsi
- Golemo Babino
- Gradeshnitsa
- Kravoder
- Krivodol
- Lesura
- Osen
- Pudriya
- Rakevo
- Urovene

The village of Gradeshnitsa is famous for the Gradeshnitsa tablets unearthed in 1969, a testimony of proto-writing known as the Vinča signs.

== Honour ==
Krivodol Glacier on Smith Island, South Shetland Islands is named after Krivodol.
