= Cioara =

Cioara may refer to the following places:

== Romania ==
- Cioara and precup and Cioara-Doicești, former names for Bărăganul, Brăila County
- Cioara, the former name for Săliștea, a commune in Alba County
- Cioara de Sus, a village in the commune Baia de Arieș, Alba County
- Cioara (Arieș), a tributary of the Arieș in Alba County
- Cioara (Mureș), a tributary of the Mureș in Alba County
- Cioara, a tributary of the Sălaj in Satu Mare and Sălaj Counties
- Valea Ciorii, a tributary of the Baldovin in Hunedoara County

== Moldova ==
- Cioara, Hîncești, a village in Hîncești district
