= Dacianism =

Tendency to ascribe an idealized past to the country as a whole

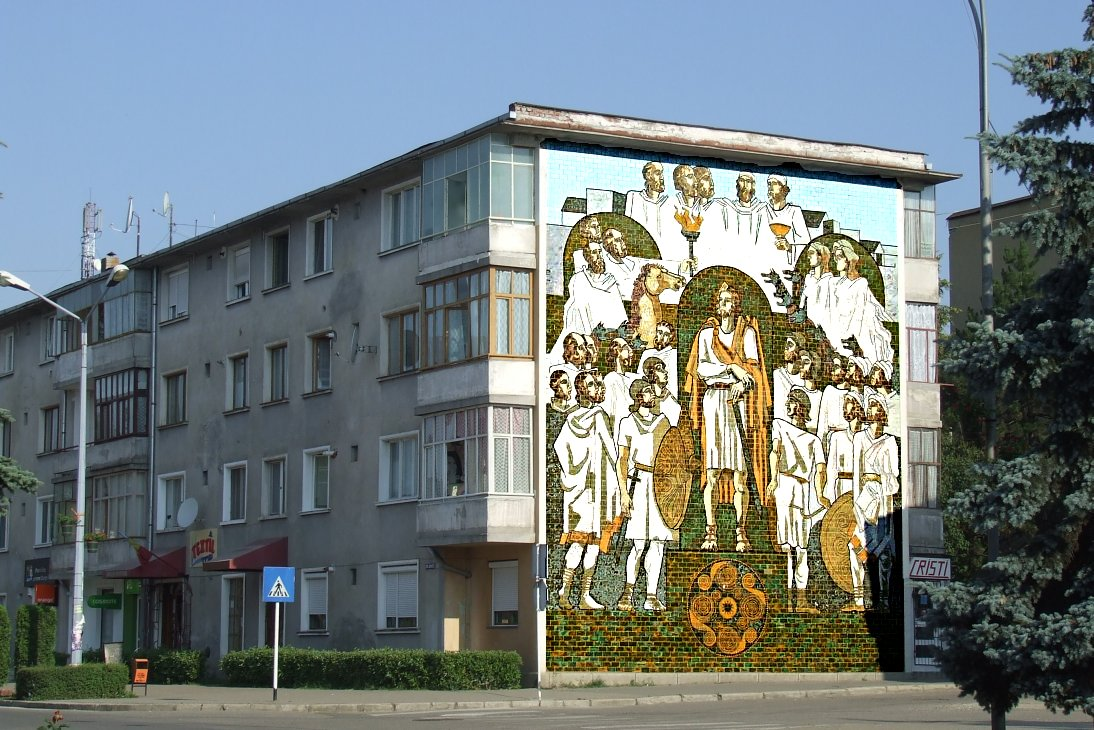
Dacian-themed mural on a communist-era apartment block in Orăștie, exhibiting the idiosyncratic nationalist traits of Romanian communism.

Dacianism is a Romanian term describing the tendency to ascribe, largely relying on questionable data and subjective interpretation, an idealised Dacian past to the country as a whole. While particularly prevalent during the regime of Nicolae Ceaușescu, its origin in Romanian scholarship dates back more than a century.

The term refers to perceived aggrandising of Dacian and earlier roots of today's Romanians. This phenomenon is also pejoratively labelled "Dacomania" or "Dacopathy" or sometimes "Thracomania", while its proponents prefer "Dacology". The term protochronism (anglicised from the Romanian: protocronism, from the Ancient Greek terms for "first in time"), originally coined to refer to the supposed pioneering character of the Romanian culture, is sometimes used as a synonym.

== Overview ==
In this context, the term makes reference to the trend (noticed in several versions of Romanian nationalism) to ascribe a unique quality to the Dacians and their civilisation. Dacianists attempt to prove either that Dacians had a major part to play in ancient history or even that they had the ascendancy over all cultures (with a particular focus on Ancient Rome, which, in a complete reversal of the founding myth, would have been created by Dacian migrants). Also noted are the exploitation of the Tărtăria tablets as certain proof that writing originated on proto-Dacian territory, and the belief that the Dacian language survived all the way to the Middle Ages.

An additional, but not universal, feature is the attempted connection between the supposed monotheism of the Zalmoxis cult and Christianity, in the belief that Dacians easily adopted and subsequently influenced the religion. Also, Christianity is argued to have been preached to the Daco-Romans by Saint Andrew, who is considered doubtfully as the clear origin of modern-day Romanian Orthodoxy. Despite the lack of supporting evidence, it is the official church stance, being found in history textbooks used in Romanian Orthodox seminaries and theology institutes.

== History ==
The ideas have been explained as part of an inferiority complex present in Romanian nationalism, one which also manifested itself in works not connected with Dacianism, mainly as a rejection of the ideas that Romanian territories only served as a colony of Rome, voided of initiative, and subject to an influx of Latins which would have completely wiped out a Dacian presence.

Dacianism most likely came about with the views professed in the 1870s by Bogdan Petriceicu Hasdeu, one of the main points of the dispute between him and the conservative Junimea. For example, Hasdeu's Etymologicum magnum Romaniae not only claimed that Dacians gave Rome many of her emperors (an idea supported in recent times by Iosif Constantin Drăgan), but also that the ruling dynasties of early medieval Wallachia and Moldavia were descendants of a caste of Dacians established with "King" (chieftain) Burebista. Other advocates of the idea before World War I included the amateur archaeologist Cezar Bolliac, as well as Teohari Antonescu and Nicolae Densușianu. The latter composed an intricate and unsupported theory on Dacia as the center of European prehistory, authoring a complete parallel to Romanian official history, which included among the Dacians such diverse figures as those of the Asen dynasty, and Horea. The main volume of his writings is Dacia Preistorică ("Prehistoric Dacia").

After World War I and throughout Greater Romania's existence, the ideology increased its appeal. The Iron Guard flirted with the concept, making considerable parallels between its projects and interpretations of what would have been Zalmoxis' message. Mircea Eliade was notably preoccupied with Zalmoxis' cult, arguing in favour of its structural links with Christianity; his theory on Dacian history, viewing Romanisation as a limited phenomenon, is celebrated by contemporary partisans of Dacianism.

In a neutral context, the Romanian archaeology school led by Vasile Pârvan investigated scores of previously ignored Dacian sites, which indirectly contributed to the idea's appeal at the time.

In 1974 Edgar Papu published in the mainstream cultural monthly Secolul XX an essay titled "The Romanian Protochronism", arguing for Romanian chronological priority for some European achievements. The idea was promptly adopted by the nationalist Ceaușescu regime, which subsequently encouraged and amplified a cultural and historical discourse claiming the prevalence of autochthony over any foreign influence. Ceaușescu's ideologues developed a singular concept after the 1974 11th Congress of the Communist Party of Romania, when they attached Dacianism to official Marxism, arguing that the Dacians had produced a permanent and "unorganised state". The Dacians had been favoured by several communist generations as autochthonous insurgents against an "imperialist" Rome (with the Stalinist leadership of the 1950s proclaiming them to be closely linked with the Slavic peoples); however, Ceaușescu's was an interpretation with a distinct motivation, making a connection with the opinions of previous Dacianists.

The regime started a partnership with Italian resident, former Iron Guard member and millionaire Iosif Constantin Drăgan, who continued championing the Dacian cause even after the fall of Ceaușescu. Critics regard these excesses as the expression of an economic nationalist course, amalgamating provincial frustrations and persistent nationalist rhetoric, as autarky and cultural isolation of the late Ceaușescu's regime came along with an increase in Dacianist messages.

Vladimir Tismăneanu wrote:

"Protochronism" was the party-sponsored ideology that claimed Romanian precedence in major scientific and cultural discoveries. It was actually the underpinning of Ceaușescu's nationalist tyranny.

While no longer backed by a totalitarian state structure after the 1989 revolution, the interpretation still enjoys popularity in several circles. The main representative of current Protochronism was still Drăgan (now deceased), but the New York City-based physician Napoleon Săvescu took over after Drăgan's death. Together, they issued the magazine Noi, Dacii ("We, the Dacians") and organised a yearly "International Congress of Dacology". Săvescu still does those.

Săvescu's most famous theory says that the Romanians are not descendants of the Roman colonists and assimilated Dacians, as mainstream historians say, but that they are the descendants of only the Dacians, who spoke a language close to Latin.

Other controversial theories of his include the Dacians (or their ancestors) having developed the first writing system in the world (see the Tărtăria tablets), the first set of laws or having conquered Western Europe, India, Iraq, Japan and the Americas.

"If the Harappa culture did not disappear after the Carpatho-Danubian invasion, how come the invaders themselves vanished, leaving no traces behind, or leaving, as Sir Wheeler put it, "nothing but a name?" How could the nomad Carpatho-Danubians, mainly a people of breeders, give birth not only to a new religion, but found splendid cities that outlived them to this day? How could the greatest and most complex literature in the world have come from these Carpatho-Danubian people? Actually, the whole Vedic literature is based on four texts (the oldest being Rig-Veda, Yajur-Veda and Sama-Veda, the later Athara-Veda and two poems resembling the Iliad and the Odyssey only two thousand years older; Ramnayana and Mahabharata have preserved a toponymy echoing that of the Aryan Carpatho-Danubians' homeland and share the same main theme – the enmity and rancor between two families fighting over the throne of Bahataral (according to some, today's Banat-Romania).

— The Conquest of India by the Carpatho-Danubian People

His theories are, however, disregarded by historical journals and most historians, e.g. Mircea Babeș, Lucian Boia and Alexandra Tomiță, who label these theories as pseudoscience and anachronistic and consider that there is not enough scientific evidence to support them. Dacia, journal of the Vasile Pârvan Institute of Archaeology, and the history journal Saeculum did not speak highly of him, either.

== Dacian script ==
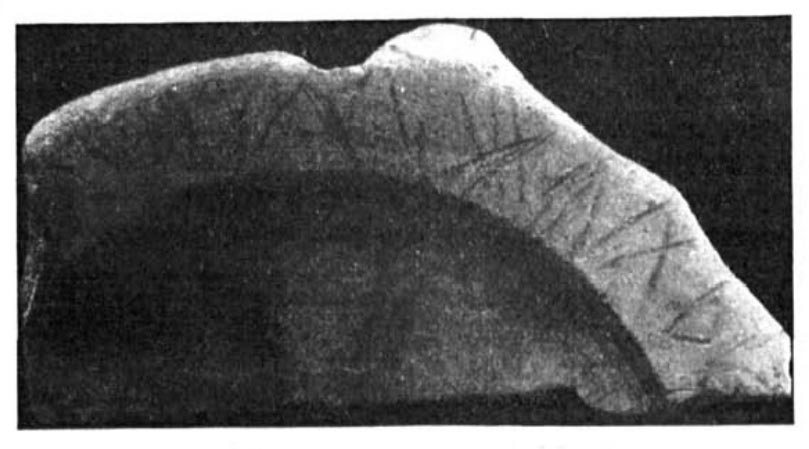
A Dacian script or the work of an illiterate potter?

"Dacian alphabet" is a term used in Romanian protochronism and Dacianism for pseudohistorical claims of a supposed alphabet of the Dacians prior to the conquest of Dacia and its absorption into the Roman Empire. Its existence was first proposed in the late 19th century by Romanian nationalists, but has been completely rejected by mainstream modern scholarship.

In the opinion of Sorin Olteanu, a modern expert at the Vasile Pârvan Institute of Archaeology, Bucharest, "[Dacian script] is pure fabrication [...] purely and simply Dacian writing does not exist", adding that many scholars believe that the use of writing may have been subject to a religious taboo among the Dacians. It is known that the ancient Dacians used the Greek and Latin alphabets, though possibly not as early as in neighbouring Thrace where the Ezerovo ring in Greek script has been dated to the 5th century BC. A vase fragment from the La Tène period (see illustration above), a probable illiterate imitation of Greek letters, indicates visual knowledge of the Greek alphabet during the La Tène period prior to the Roman invasion. Some Romanian writers writing at the end of the 19th century and later identified as protochronists, particularly the Romanian poet and journalist Cezar Bolliac, an enthusiast amateur archaeologist, claimed to have discovered a Dacian alphabet. They were immediately criticized for archaeological and linguistic reasons. Alexandru Odobescu criticized some of Bolliac's conclusions. In 1871 Odobescu, along with Henric Trenk, inventoried the Fundul Peșterii cave, one of the Ialomiței caves (See the Romanian Wikipedia article) near Buzău. Odobescu was the first to be fascinated by its writings, which were later dated to the 3rd or 4th century. In 2002, the controversial Romanian historian, Viorica Enăchiuc, stated that the Codex Rohonczi is written in a Dacian alphabet. The equally controversial linguist Aurora Petan (2005) claims that some Sinaia lead plates could contain unique Dacian scripts.

The linguist George Pruteanu called protochronism as "the barren and paranoid nationalism", because protochronism claims that the Dacian language was the origin of Latin and all other languages, including Hindi and Babylonian.

== See also ==
- Antiquization
- Gothicism
- Great Lechia
