= Alba Iulia Cathedral =

Alba Iulia Cathedral may refer to one of two cathedrals in Alba Iulia, Romania:

- St. Michael's Cathedral (Roman Catholic)
- Coronation Cathedral (Romanian Orthodox)
