= Tartaria =

Tartaria or Tataria can refer to:

- Tartary, a historical term for northern and central Asia
- Tartarian Empire, a group of pseudoscientific conspiracy theories
- Tărtăria, a village in Săliștea in Romania
- Tatarstan, a first-level administrative subdivision of Russia, sometimes called Tataria
