= Diocese of the Romanian Army =

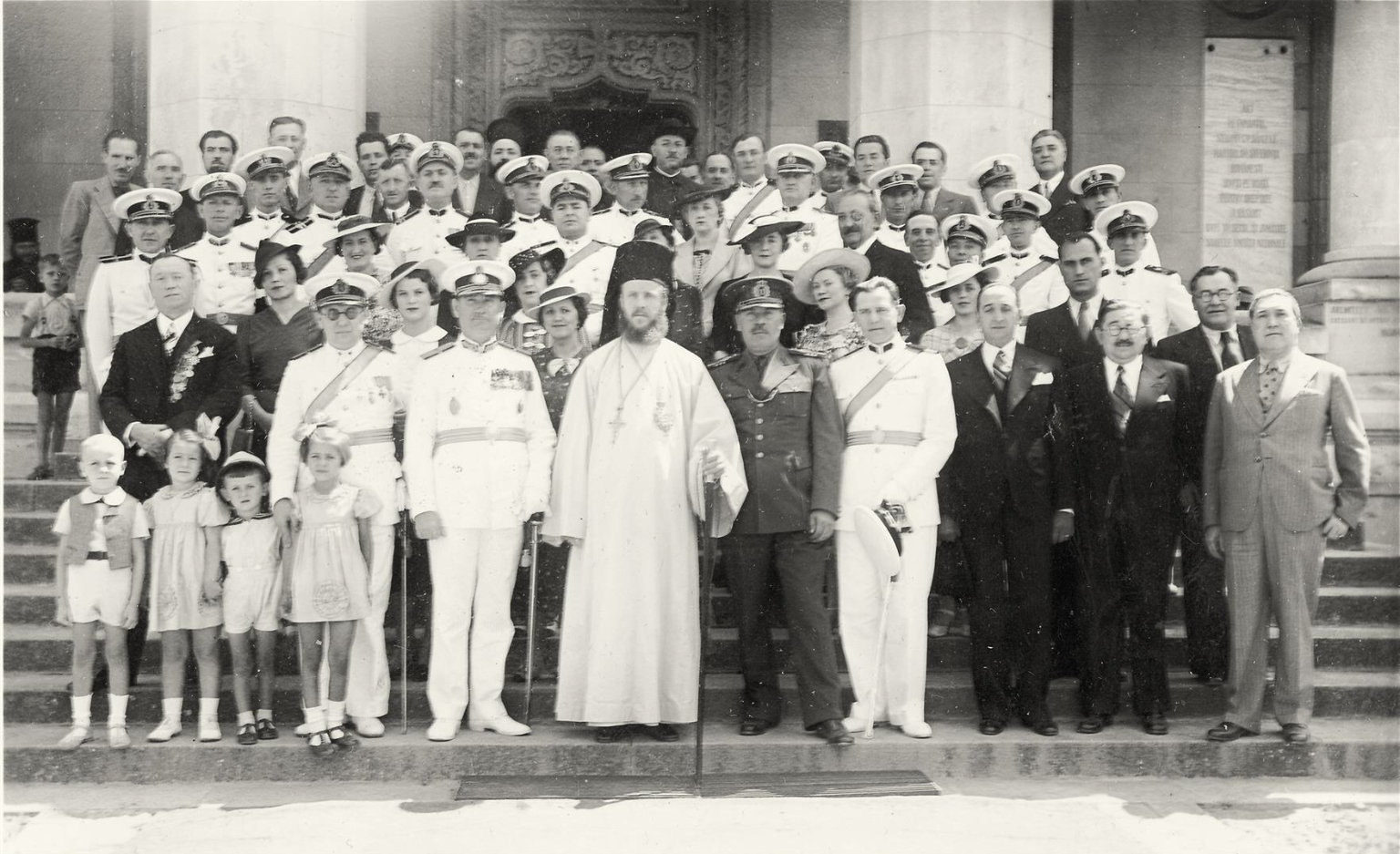
Army Bishop Partenie Ciopron on the steps of the Coronation Cathedral in Alba Iulia, surrounded by officers, wives and children, c. 1938

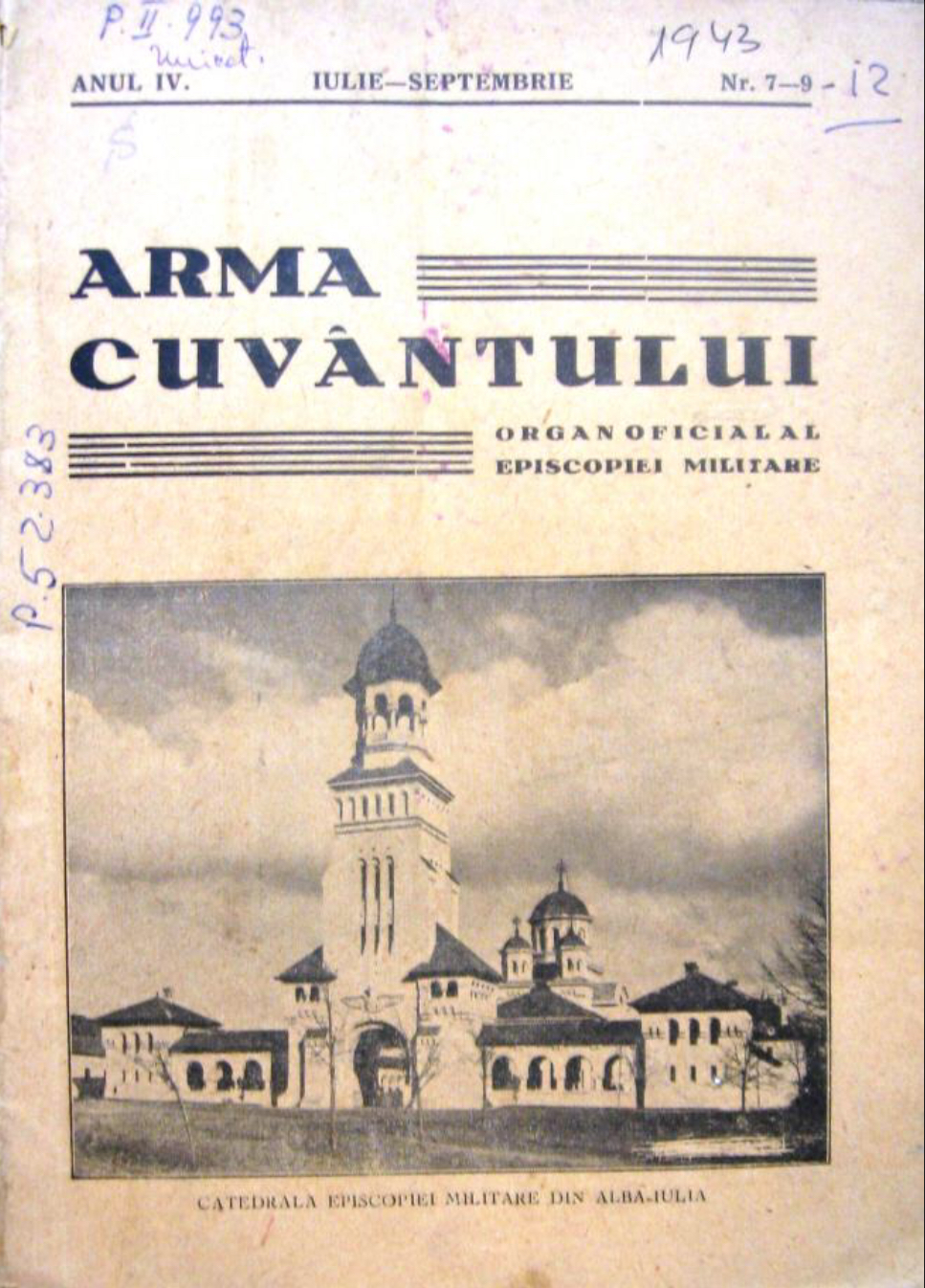
Arma Cuvântului diocesan magazine for July–September 1943, with the Coronation Cathedral on its cover

The Diocese of the Romanian Army (Romanian: Episcopia Armatei Române) was a diocese of the Romanian Orthodox Church, affiliated with the Romanian Army. Established in 1921 in the wake of World War I, it was disbanded in 1948 by the new communist regime.

== History ==
The formal affiliation of Orthodox clergy with the military in what is now Romania began in 1850, when the government of Wallachia took a series of measures to assign priests to militia units. Ties were strengthened in the 1870s, under Prince Carol I, culminating in the Romanian War of Independence, when priests accompanied troops in the trenches and monks worked in the medical service. By the end of World War I, 252 priests had been mobilized; of these, 24 were killed and six seriously wounded.

In the summer of 1921, the Romanian Parliament passed a law establishing the diocese. The measure was backed by Pimen Georgescu, the Metropolitan of Moldavia; and by War Minister Ioan Rășcanu. It provided for priests to become active-duty members of the military, with ranks corresponding to the unit they served. Military priests could be of any faith, based on the unit’s majority. In large garrisons, religious minorities could each supply an additional clergyman.

The bishop was chosen by the War Minister from candidates proposed by the Holy Synod, and then invested by the king. His headquarters was in Alba Iulia, where the union of Transylvania with Romania had recently taken place. Styled the Bishop of Alba Iulia, he held the rank of brigadier-general. His administrative role extended to all military clergy, while his spiritual one covered only Orthodox priests. His seat soon became the Coronation Cathedral, and he was an ex officio synod member.

Vasile Saftu was the first bishop named to head the diocese in 1921; he died before fully assuming the role. He was succeeded by Iustinian Teculescu, who was named in autumn 1922, began serving the following spring and left in late 1924. Ioan Stroia was bishop from June 1925 until his death in April 1937. The final office-holder was Partenie Ciopron, enthroned in October 1937. The latter took over a decaying institution; his reforms helped grow the number of military priests from 30 in 1937 to 108 in 1941. In 1940, he established a diocesan magazine, Arma Cuvântului (“The Weapon of the Word”); it ran for 48 numbers, until 1944.

Some 300 military priests served in World War II. During the conflict, the church legitimated and lent spiritual support to the Ion Antonescu regime’s message that Romania was fighting a crusade against "Jewish Bolshevism". The diocese, through its military missionary activities in Transnistria Governorate, formed part of this effort. After the 1944 Romanian coup d'état and the gradual consolidation of the Romanian Communist Party’s position, the army diocese lost importance: numerous military priests were sent into the reserves, and the organization was subjected to constant political pressures. Its end came in August 1948, when the nascent communist regime published a decree abolishing the diocese.
