= Sinaia lead plates =

Mysterious plates made of lead found in Romania in the 19th century

The Sinaia lead plates (Romanian: Tăblițele de la Sinaia) are a set of lead plates written in an unknown language or constructed language. They are alleged to be a chronicle of the Dacians, but are considered by some scholars to be modern forgeries. The plates were written in the Greek alphabet with a few other character additions.

== History ==
The origin of the Sinaia lead plates is obscure. The first known mention of them was when the 200 lead plates were discovered in the warehouse of the Bucharest Museum of Antiquities, Romania, in the 19th century. Of the 200 pieces originally in the collection of plates, only 35 are known to remain today, but there are some photos of some of the rest.

According to a dubious "oral tradition", the lead plates are in fact copies made at the Nail Factory of Sinaia in 1875 from the originals, which were allegedly made of gold, and they were kept for a while at the Sinaia Monastery. Allegedly, the gold was used either in the building of Peleș Castle, or the plates were part of the Romanian Treasure which was never returned by Russia after World War I.

An analysis made at the Institute of Atomic Physics in Măgurele concluded that the composition of the plates is very similar to printing lead manufactured in the 19th century.

== Description ==
Most of the plates are roughly rectangular, with the exception of one round plate. They have dimensions between 93 mm × 98 mm (3.7 in × 3.9 in) and 354 mm × 255 mm (13.9 in × 10.0 in). Most are written using scriptio continua in the Greek alphabet, with a few additional signs; the text includes "V" from the Latin alphabet and signs for palatal "c" and "g" resembling those of the Cyrillic script.

They also include text written in some unknown scripts that do not resemble any known written alphabet. In addition to the text, the plates also contain many complex illustrations, including those of armies, kings, cities, temples and buildings.

== Language ==
The language appears to have some Indo-European traits, but it has nothing in common with what linguists expect to be Dacian language, as no correlation with the Romanian language substrate can be found.

Also, unlike any known Indo-European language, it appears to have almost no inflections, nor declensions. In addition, almost all nouns end in "-o", including names which had other endings in Latin and Greek, e.g. Boerobiseto, Dacibalo, Napoko and Sarmigetuzo.

There are some words borrowed from Greek (basileo from basileus, chiliarcho, from chiliarchos) and Latin, but some important words such as the alleged words for "king" (mato) and "priest" (kotopolo) do not appear to have any known Indo-European cognates.

== Debate and author ==
The scholarly consensus is that they are modern forgeries. According to the director of the Institute of Archaeology, Alexandru Vulpe, it is obvious they were made in the 19th century and this was the opinion of both Vasile Pârvan and the archaeologists who studied them after him, some believing they were created by Bogdan Petriceicu Hasdeu, who is known to have made other forgeries as well.

According to Vulpe, the tablets include only what was known before 1900; for example, it uses the spelling "Comidava" for a Dacian town, although now it is known that the correct spelling is "Cumidava", as found in 1942 in an honorific inscription dedicated to Julia Mamaea.

== See also ==
- Tărtăria tablets
- Gradeshnitsa tablets
- Lead Books of Sacromonte, forged inscriptions on lead plates

== Bibliography ==
- Dumitru Manolache, Tezaurul dacic de la Sinaia – legendă sau adevăr ocultat?, Editura Dacica, 2006
- Bucurescu, Adrian, Tainele tăblițelor de la Sinaia, Editura Arhetip, 2005
- Romalo, Dan, Cronica apocrifă pe plăci de plumb?, Arvin Press, București, 2003
- Romalo, Dan, Cronica getă apocrifă pe plăci de plumb, Editura Alcor, București, 2005
- Velcescu, Cornelia, Inscripții rupestre din Munții Carpați, Editura MIRACOL, Burești, 2002
- Horia Turcanu (Formula AS): "Misterul tăblițelor de plumb"
- Academia Republicii Popular Romîne, Documente privind istoria Romîniei: Introducere, 1956
- Emil Vîrtosu, Paleografia româno-chirilică, Ed. Științifică, 1968
- (in English) Horace Gray Lunt, Old Church Slavonic Grammar, Walter de Gruyter, 2001
- (in English) Isaac Taylor, History of the Alphabet: Aryan Alphabets, Kessinger Publishing, 2003 (1899)
- (in English) Isaac Taylor, Greeks and Goths a Study on the Runes, Kessinger Publishing, 2004 (1879)
- (in English) Winfred Philipp Lehmann, Historical Linguistics: An Introduction, Routledge, 1992 (1962)
