= Coronation Cathedral, Alba Iulia =

Romanian Orthodox cathedral in Romania

Coordinates: 46.068448°N 23.569821°E

Cathedral of the Holy Trinity
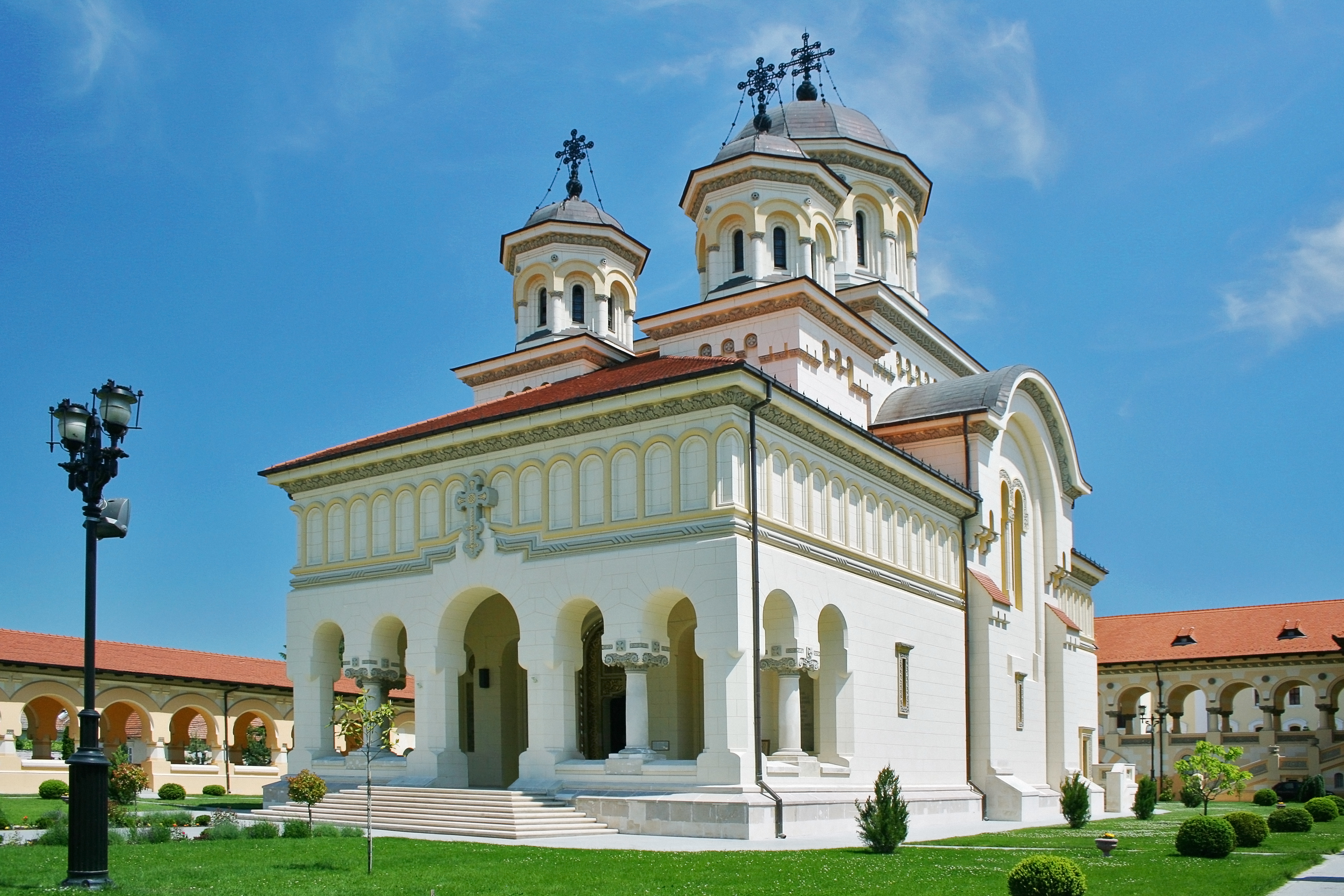

Religion
- Affiliation: Romanian Orthodox Church
- District: Archdiocese of Alba Iulia
- Province: Metropolis of Transylvania
- Rite: Byzantine
- Year consecrated: 1922, 2008

Location
- Location: Alba Iulia, Romania
- Interactive map of Cathedral of the Holy Trinity

Architecture
- Architect: Victor Gheorghe Ștefănescu
- Style: Neo-Byzantine layout, Neo-Brâncovenesc elements
- Groundbreaking: 1921
- Completed: 1922

Specifications
- Height (max): 40 m
- Spire: Three
- Materials: Stone

The Coronation Cathedral (Romanian: Catedrala Încoronării), dedicated to the Holy Trinity and the Holy Archangels Michael and Gabriel, is a Romanian Orthodox cathedral located at 16 Mihai Viteazul Street, Alba Iulia, Romania. Built soon after and in commemoration of the Union of Transylvania with Romania, it is the seat of the Romanian Orthodox Archdiocese of Alba Iulia.

== Background ==
The cathedral and surrounding buildings were raised in the western part of the Alba Iulia Citadel, on the site of a gatehouse near the Roman Plateau. It was thought of as a continuation of the former metropolitan seat at Alba Iulia (then called Bălgrad), where Michael the Brave built a stone church in 1597. When the citadel was rebuilt in its current form in 1713–1714, the Habsburg authorities demolished this and its materials were used to build a new church near where the railway station is today. A wooden memorial church in the southeastern part of the citadel marks the site of the former metropolitan cathedral.

Built in 1921–1922, the cathedral was ready in time for the coronation of King Ferdinand and Queen Marie as monarchs of Greater Romania on 15 October 1922. This event, which took place in the same city where the Union of Transylvania with Romania occurred on 1 December 1918, was meant to give the union added symbolic and religious weight. Ferdinand, a Roman Catholic, objected to being crowned inside an Orthodox church, so the coronation ceremony was held outside in the courtyard. In commemoration of the event, busts of the king and queen were placed on the grounds in 2008.

== Architecture ==
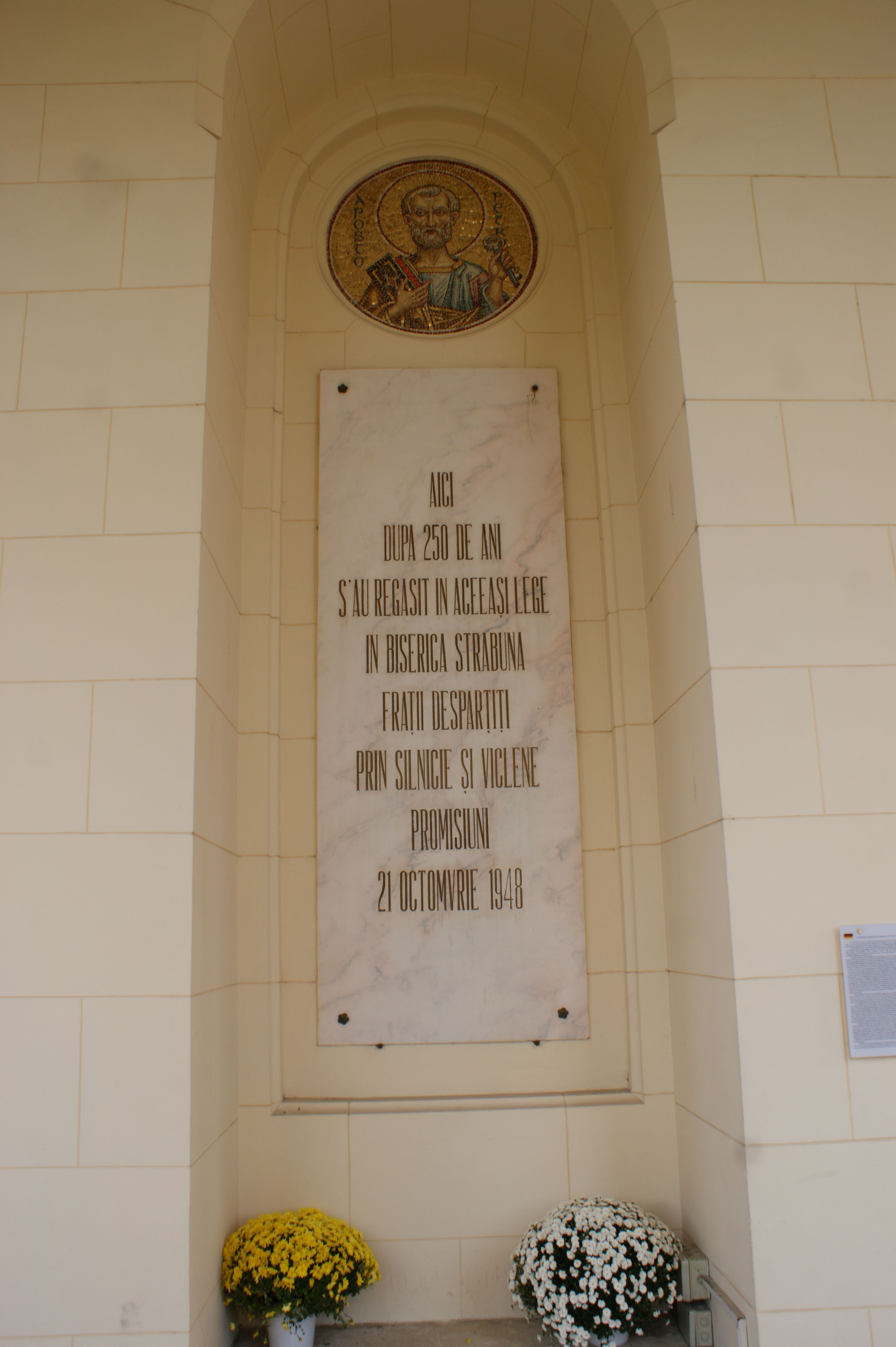
Marble plaque near the cathedral entrance celebrating the dissolution of the Romanian Greek Catholic Church in 1948, with the following text: "Here, after 250 years, brothers separated by force and deceitful promises found themselves in the same ancient church."

The cathedral forms part of a group of buildings erected beginning in the late 19th century in the national style promoted by Ion Mincu and Petre Antonescu, incorporating traditional forms of Romanian architecture, in particular the Brâncovenesc style, and adapting them to modern tastes. The plan, an inscribed Greek cross, draws upon the Târgovişte Princely Church. Similarly, the exterior decorative elements, such as niches, beads about the column capitals and arcades, as well as the domes, resemble those found in Wallachian churches from the time of Matei Basarab and Constantin Brâncoveanu. The interior fresco painting, by Costin Petrescu and his apprentices, follows the dictates of traditional Byzantine Orthodox iconography while exhibiting Western influences.

The entrance to the building has an open porch with large arches supported by columns with capitals. The portal is decorated with traditional motifs, and above it are mosaic icons of the archangels Michael and Gabriel, while one side of the entrance has icons of Saints Peter and Paul and the other of Kings David and Solomon. The porch's niches have marble plates commemorating four events: Metropolitan Simion Ştefan printing the first Romanian-language New Testament in 1648; the union of the three Romanian principalities achieved by Michael the Brave in 1600; the execution of Horea, Cloşca and Crişan in 1785; and the merger of the Romanian Greek-Catholic Church into the Orthodox Church in 1948, an act forced by the new Communist regime, supported at the time by the Orthodox Church but denounced as unlawful by Greek-Catholics. Also during that period, the authorities had the edifice's name changed to Catedrală Reîntregirii Neamului ("Cathedral of the Unity of the People") in order to minimize associations with the abolished monarchy, but the "Coronation Cathedral" name staged somewhat of a comeback following the 1989 fall of the regime.

One special feature are the paintings of historical figures or individuals who played a role in local religious life. Paintings of the ktitor of the first metropolitan church in Bălgrad, Michael the Brave, and of his wife Lady Stanca appear in the narthex. The tall nave is dominated by a cupola painted with the image of Christ Pantocrator and held up by four octagonal columns coated in Moneasa marble. The western wall of the nave has paintings of clerics from the time when the cathedral was built: Nicolae Bălan, Metropolitan of Transylvania, and Miron Cristea, Patriarch of All Romania, as well as votive portraits of King Ferdinand and Queen Marie. The altar apse is painted with the Theotokos and scenes from the Bible. There are three octagonal spires, each lighted by eight windows, with an onion dome roof and a metal cross on top.

In front of the carved and painted oak iconostasis and adjacent to the triumphal arch, there are large portraits of former Metropolitans of Transylvania Ilie Iorest and Sava Brancovici, as well as of the monks Visarion Sarai and Sofronie of Cioara, and the martyr Oprea Miclăuş of Sălişte, all of whom were canonized in the cathedral in 1955. A pair of thrones inscribed with royal symbols was placed beside the iconostasis during the solemn coronation service. In addition to the iconostasis, the furniture and choir are also oak and decorated with Brâncovenesc motifs.

The cathedral lies on a rectangular lot which has four pavilions, one in each corner, linked by galleries that recall those found in monasteries, formed of open double arcades held up by columns. Some of the columns have Corinthian capitals with Brâncovenesc touches. The larger, eastern pavilions house the archdiocesan residence and administration. The smaller, western ones are used by those who run the building and grounds. The 58 m-high bell tower, with the entrance to the complex beneath it, lies between the western pavilions. From the early 1920s until 1948, the cathedral was the headquarters of the Diocese of the Romanian Army. It is now the seat of the Archdiocese of Alba Iulia, which has held this rank since 1998, having previously been a diocese since 1975. The building was renovated in 1993, the 75th anniversary of the 1918 Union.

Bell tower

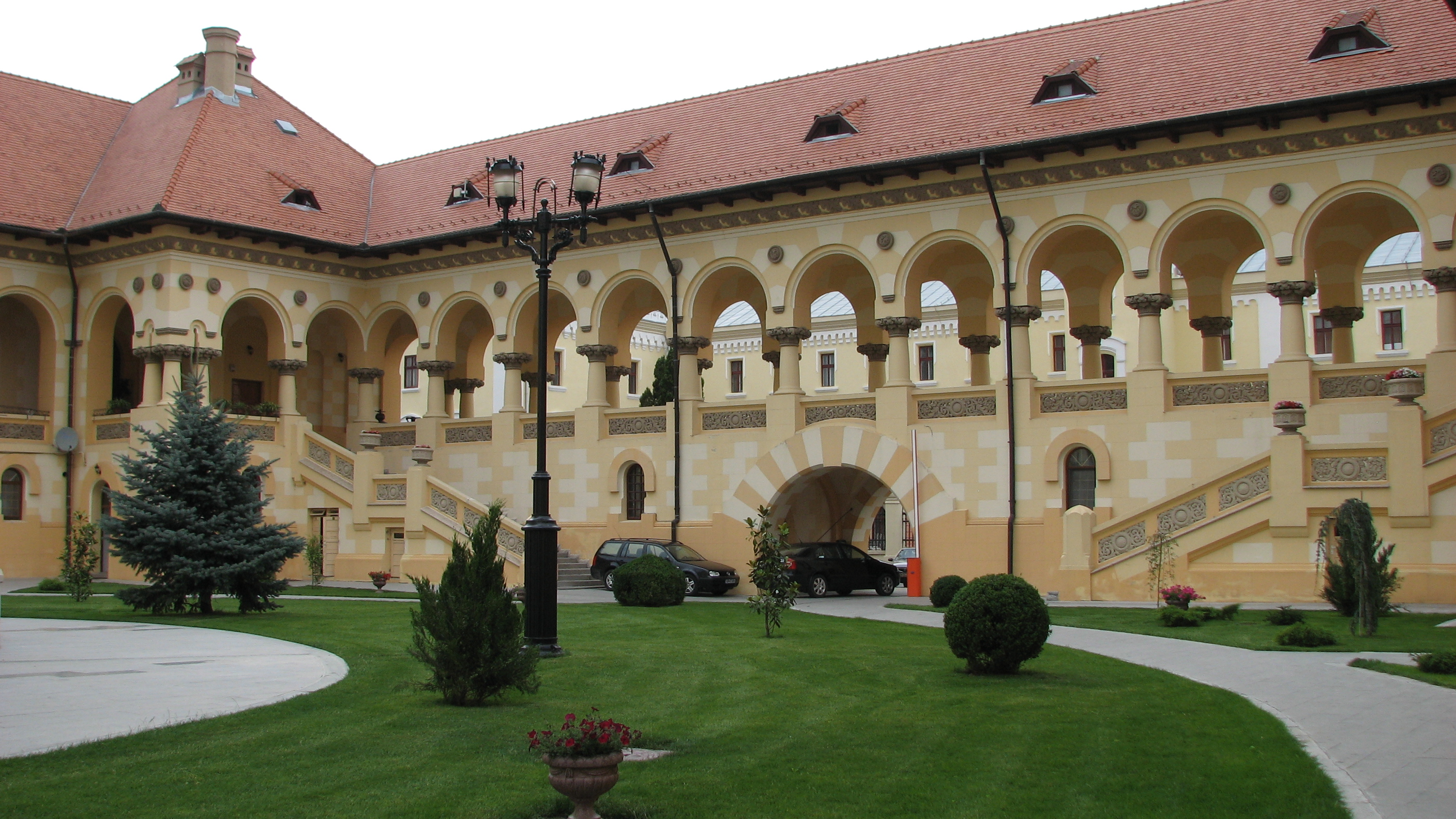
Pavilion and gallery

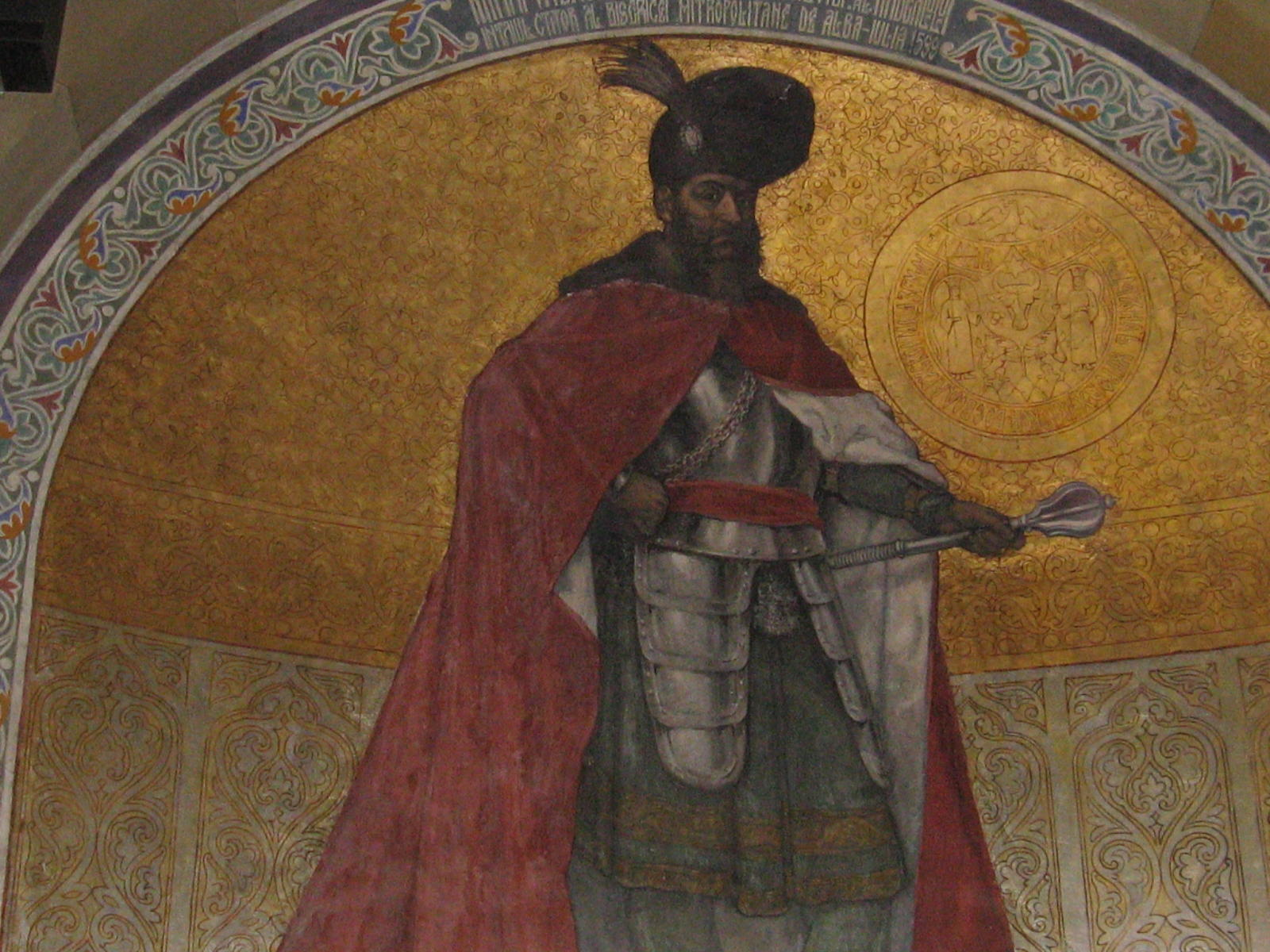
Michael the Brave wall painting

Iconostasis
