= Johann Michael Ackner =

Austrian archaeologist (1782–1862)

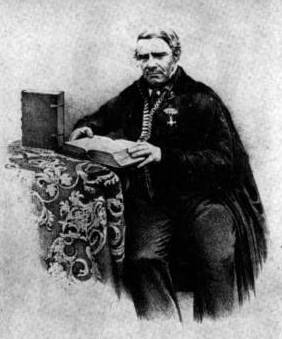
- Born: Johann Michael Ackner; January 25, 1782; Schäßburg, Habsburg Monarchy (Sighișoara, Romania)
- Died: September 12, 1862 (aged 80); Hermannstadt, Austrian Empire (Sibiu, Romania)
- Occupations: Archaeologist, nature researcher
- Spouse: Maria Magdalena Ebner
- Children: 12

Johann Michael Ackner (January 25, 1782 – August 12, 1862) was a Transylvanian archaeologist and nature researcher.

== Biography ==
A Saxon born in Schäßburg (Sighișoara), a town in the Habsburg controlled Principality of Transylvania (now part of Romania), Johann Ackner first studied at the college in his hometown. He then went on to study philosophy at the Reformed College of Hermannstadt and in 1805 in Wittenberg. However, his studies were interrupted by the occupation of Wittenberg by the troops of the French Empire in 1806. Ackner continued his studies in Göttingen where he heard among others Christian Gottlob Heyne, Johann Friedrich Blumenbach, Johann Beckmann and Arnold Hermann Ludwig Heeren.

After finishing his university studies, he traveled by foot through large parts of Germany, France, Italy and Switzerland. After returning to Transylvania, he worked for 13 years as professor of philology and archaeology at the school of Hermannstadt. In 1821, the community of Hermannstadt elected him as priest, which gave him time to follow his studies.

He traveled several times between 1832 and 1847 to visit areas of ancient Roman and Dacian history, as well as sites of mineral findings and petrifactions in Transylvania and neighbouring countries. As a result of these travels, he wrote a series of archaeological tracts and tracts on natural history and collected Roman Dacian antiquities, coins, petrifactions and minerals. He often accepted visitors from scientific circles in his parish. In 1851, Johann Michael Ackner was elected as member of the German Academy of Sciences Leopoldina. In 1856 he initiated the archaeological research at the ancient Dacian town of Cumidava (now Râșnov), where the Romans built a castrum after the conquest of Dacia.

Ackner died in 1862 in Hermannstadt (Sibiu).

== Works ==
- Antiqua musei Parisiorum monumenta, Hermannstadt, 1809
- Mineralogie Siebenbürgens mit geognostischen Andeutungen, 1847-1855
- Die römischen Altertümer und deutschen Burgen in Siebenbürgen mit einer Übersichtskarte
- Die Colonien und militärischen Standlager der Römer in Dacien
- Die römischen Inschriften in Dacien, gesammelt und bearbeitet von J.W.Ackner und Friedr. Müller, Vienna, 1856
