= List of inscriptions in Serbia =

This is a list of ancient epigraphy found in Serbia.

== Inscriptions ==
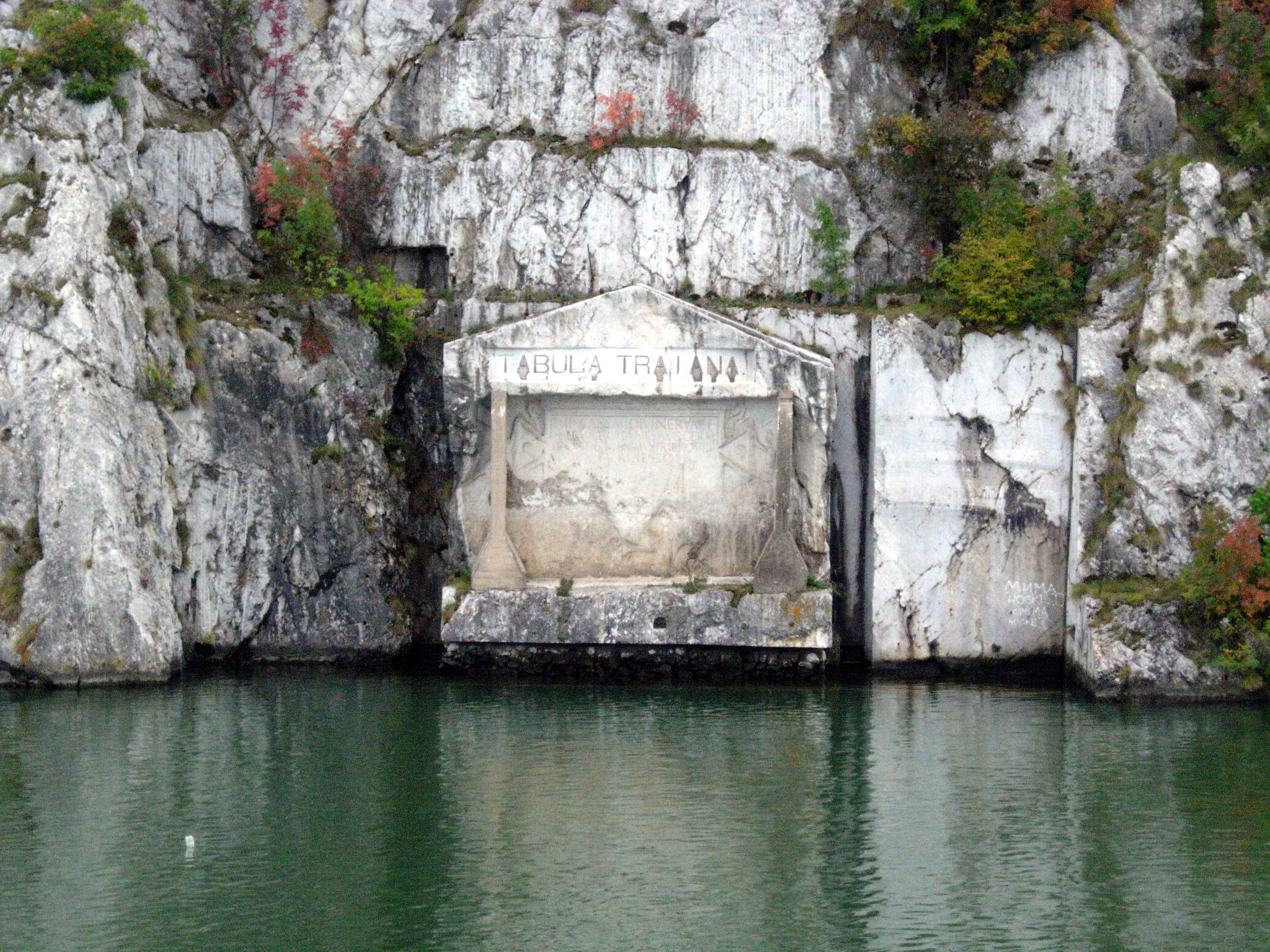
Tabula Traiana in 2008

- Tabula Traiana inscription: a Roman memorial plaque from 1st century AD near Kladovo.

IMP. CAESAR. DIVI. NERVAE. F NERVA TRAIANVS. AVG. GERM PONTIF MAXIMUS TRIB POT IIII PATER PATRIAE COS III MONTIBVUS EXCISI(s) ANCO(ni)BVS SVBLAT(i)S VIA(m) F(ecit)

Meaning: "Emperor Nerva son of the divine Nerva, Nerva Trajan, the Augustus, Germanicus, Pontifex maximus, invested for the fourth time as Tribune, Father of the Fatherland, Consul for the third time, excavating mountain rocks and using wood beams has made this road."

== Personal names ==
- Daizinis, Daizo: Thracian personal name found in Belgrade and Kostolac

== Unknown ==
- Vinča symbols: undeciphered proto-writing dating to 5th millennium BC found at Vinča.
