= Cioara (Mureș) =

Cioara Csóra-patak
- Location within Romania

Location
- Country: Romania
- Counties: Alba County
- Villages: Săliștea, Tărtăria

Physical characteristics
- Mouth: Mureș
  - location: Tărtăria
  - coordinates: 45.9450°N 23.3938°E
- Length: 17 km (11 mi)
- Basin size: 48 km^{2} (19 sq mi)

Basin features
- Progression: Mureș→ Tisza→ Danube→ Black Sea
- Tributaries
  - right: Freman

The Cioara (Hungarian: Csóra-patak) is a left tributary of the river Mureș in Romania. It discharges into the Mureș near Tărtăria. Its length is 17 km (11 mi) and its basin size is 48 km^{2} (19 sq mi).
