= Vinča symbols =

Symbols found upon Vinča culture artifacts

A modern drawing of a clay vessel unearthed in Vinča, found at a depth of 8.5 m (28 ft)

The Vinča symbols (Note: Sometimes known as the Vinča script, Vinča–Turdaș signs, Old European script, and Danube script, among other variations.) are a set of undeciphered symbols found on artifacts from the Neolithic Vinča culture and other "Old European" cultures of Central and Southeast Europe. They have sometimes been described as an example of proto-writing. The symbols went out of use around 3500 BC. Many scholars agree that the "writing" itself is not based on any language whatsoever and it is mostly symbolic.

== Discovery ==
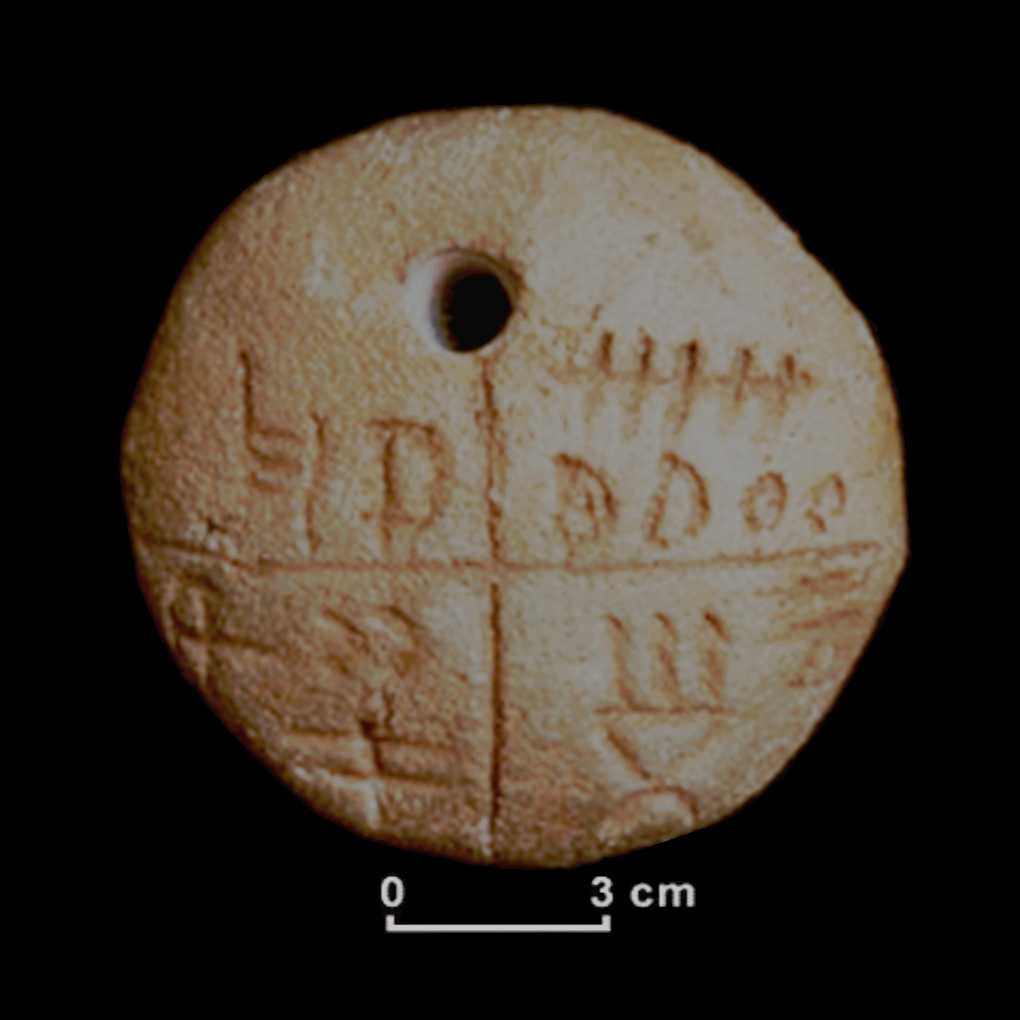
Clay tablet, one of the Tărtăria tablets unearthed near Tărtăria, Romania

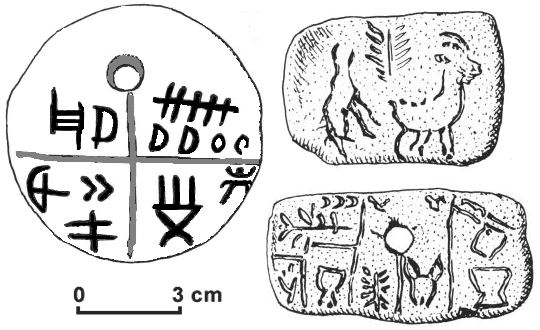
The 'Tartaria tablets'

In 1875, archaeological excavations directed by the Hungarian archaeologist Baroness Zsófia Torma (1840–1899) at Tordos (present Turdaș, Romania) unearthed marble and fragments of pottery inscribed with previously unknown symbols. At the site, on the Maros river, a feeder into a tributary of the Danube, female figurines, pots, and artifacts made of stone were also found. In 1908, a similar cache was found during excavations directed by Serbian archaeologist Miloje Vasić (1869–1956) in Vinča, a suburb of Belgrade, some 245 km (152 mi) from Turdaș. Later, more such fragments were found in Banjica, another part of Belgrade. Since 1875, over 150 Vinča sites have been identified in Serbia alone, but many, including Vinča itself, have not been fully excavated.

The discovery of the Tărtăria tablets in Romania by a team directed by Nicolae Vlassa in 1961 revived debate regarding the inscriptions. Vlassa believed them to be pictograms. Other items found at the site of the discovery were subsequently radiocarbon-dated to before 4000 BC, (Note: The tablets themselves cannot be directly radiocarbon dated due to a modern heat treatment compromising them.) around 1,300 years earlier than the date Vlassa expected and pre-dating the writing systems of the Sumerians and Minoans. However, the circumstances of their discovery and authenticity of the tablets themselves is disputed.

The Gradeshnitsa tablets are clay artefacts with incised marks. They were unearthed in 1969 near the village of Gradeshnitsa in the Vratsa Province of north-western Bulgaria. The tablets are dated to the 4th millennium BC and are currently preserved in the History Museum of Vratsa.

== Corpus ==
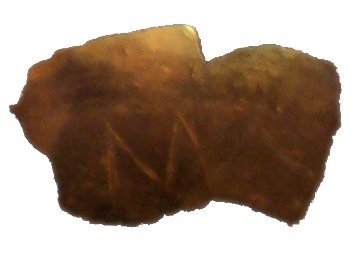
Fragment of a clay vessel with an M-shaped incision

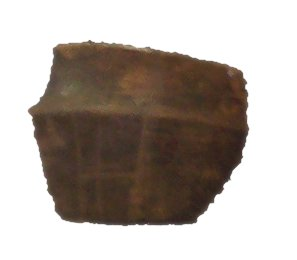
Potsherd bearing an inscribed mark belonging to the corpus of Vinča symbols

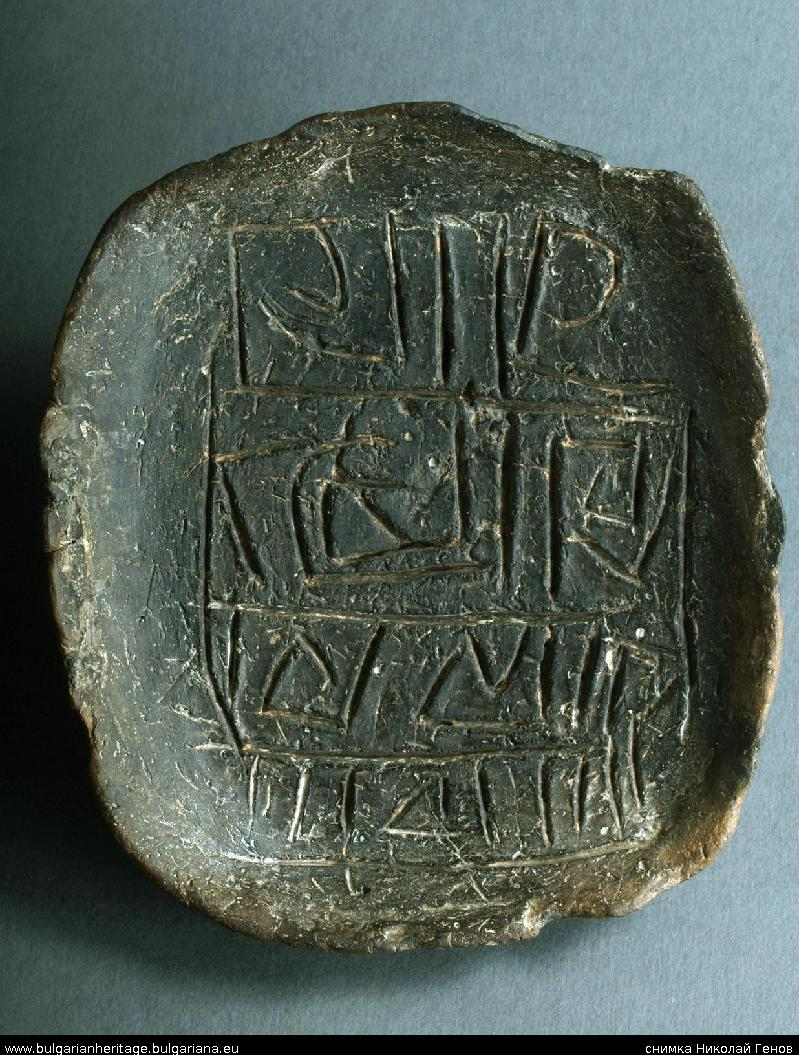
One of the Gradeshnitsa tablets

Although a large number of symbols are known, most artifacts contain so few symbols that they are very unlikely to represent a complete text.

Most of the inscriptions are on pottery, with the remainder appearing on ceramic spindle whorls, figurines, and a small collection of other objects. The symbols themselves consist of a variety of abstract and representative pictograms, including zoomorphic (animal-like) representations, combs or brush patterns and abstract symbols such as swastikas, crosses and chevrons. Over 85% of the inscriptions consist of a single symbol. Other objects include groups of symbols, of which some are arranged in no particularly obvious pattern, with the result that neither the order nor the direction of the signs in these groups is readily determinable. The usage of symbols varies significantly between objects; symbols that appear by themselves tend almost exclusively to appear on pots, while symbols that are grouped with other symbols tend to appear on whorls. Quantitative linguistic analysis leads to the conclusion that 59% of the signs share the properties of pottery marks, 11.5% are part of asymmetric ornaments typical for whorls of the Vinča culture, and 29.5% may represent some sort of symbolic (semasiographic) notation.

A database of Vinča inscriptions, DatDas, has been developed by Marco Merlini:

DatDas organizes a catalogue of 5,421 actual signs. These are recorded from a corpus of 1,178 inscriptions composed of two or more signs and 971 inscribed artifacts (some finds have two or more inscriptions).

=== Dating ===
These findings are important because the bulk of the Vinča symbols were created between 4,500 and 4,000 BC, with the symbols on the Tărtăria clay tablets possibly dating back to around 5,300 BC (controversially dated by association). This means that the Vinča finds predate the proto-Sumerian pictographic script from Uruk (modern Iraq), which is usually considered to be the oldest known writing system, by more than a thousand years. Analyses of the symbols showed that they have little similarity with Near Eastern writing, resulting in the opinion that these symbols and the Sumerian script probably arose independently.

== Interpretations ==
The nature of the symbols is unknown. Attempts to interpret the symbols have been made, but have not led to any agreement among scholars. It is unlikely that they represent a writing system. However, use of proto-writing systems featuring ideographic symbols may date as early as the Lower Paleolithic. The Vinča symbols may have served a range of purposes, such as representing ownership, individual or communal identities, or themes of a sacred or religious nature.

=== Property ===
Some researchers, such as Milutin Garašanin and Dragoslav Srejović, have suggested that the symbols were potters' marks or owners' marks, meaning "this belongs to X". Some symbols, principally those restricted to the base of pots, are wholly unique and such signs may denote the contents, the provenance or destination, or the manufacturer or owner of the pot. However, some of the symbols have been repeatedly found throughout the territory of the Vinča culture, dated hundreds of years apart, and in locations kilometers away from each other.

=== Numerals ===
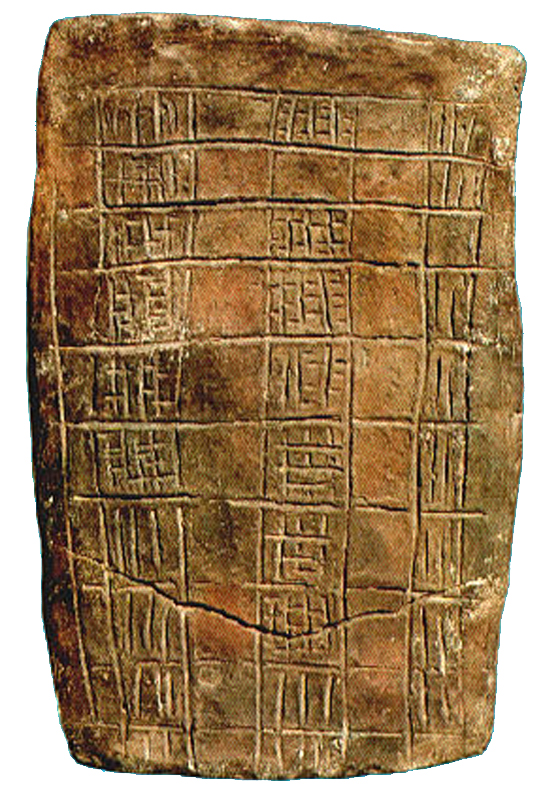
Inscribed object from the Karanovo culture

Some of the "comb" or "brush" symbols, which collectively constitute as much as a sixth of all the symbols so far discovered, may represent a form of prehistoric counting. The Vinča culture appears to have traded its wares quite widely with other cultures, as demonstrated by the widespread distribution of inscribed pots, so it is possible that the "numerical" symbols conveyed information about the value of the pots or their contents. Other cultures, such as the Minoans and Sumerians, initially developed their scripts as accounting tools; the Vinča symbols may have served a similar purpose.

=== Religious symbolism ===
The symbols may have been used for ritual or commemorative purposes. If this was so the fact that the same symbols were used for centuries with little change suggests that the ritual meaning and culture represented by the symbols likewise remained constant for a very long duration, undergoing little further development during that time. However, the use of the symbols seems to have been abandoned (along with the objects on which they appear) at the start of the Bronze Age, suggesting that the new technology brought with it significant changes in social organization or population, and beliefs.

The anthropologist Marija Gimbutas interpreted the inscribed objects as votive offerings. One argument in favour of the ritual explanation is that the objects on which the symbols appear do not seem to have had much long-term significance to their owners – they are commonly found in pits and other refuse areas. Certain objects, principally figurines, are most usually found buried under houses. This is consistent with the supposition that they were prepared for household religious ceremonies in which the signs incised on the objects represent expressions: a desire, request, vow, etc. After the ceremony was completed, the object would either have no further significance (hence would be disposed of) or would be buried ritually.

=== Proto-writing ===
It is unlikely that the Vinča symbols represent an early writing system. It is not likely that the stateless societies of Neolithic Europe would have had cause to independently invent writing, which was developed in Mesopotamia to facilitate accounting as required for the administration of political and economic systems in early state societies. There is no evidence that such institutions existed in the Vinča culture.

Some researchers, such as Marija Gimbutas and archaeo-semiologist Marco Merlini, have argued that the Vinča symbols belonged to a wider tradition of literacy in Old Europe, which they referred to the "Old European script" and the "Danube script" respectively. Gimbutas reconstructed a hypothetical pre-Indo-European "Civilization of Old Europe" occupying the area between the Dniester valley and the Sicily-Crete line. She incorporated the Vinča markings into her model of Old Europe, suggesting that they might either be the writing system for an Old European language, or more probably a system of proto-writing. This view has been generally met with skepticism. The symbols themselves have not been discovered outside of an area comprising Serbia (i.e., Vinča itself), southeastern Hungary, western Romania, and western Bulgaria.

Quantitative linguist Michael Mäder, a researcher who opposes the view held by proponents of the Danube script, argued that, based on the criteria for determining whether a script is a genuine script, the Danube script cannot be regarded as either a genuine script or a proto-script. He argues that in the list of symbols compiled by Shan Winn, these were rotated and arranged arbitrarily. This enabled Winn to include as wide a range of symbols as possible (most of which were isolated ceramic markings). However, there are not enough repetitions of sequences across the entire corpus to substantiate an independent script. Instead, the signs collected by Winn consist of ceramic markings (59%) and asymmetrical ornaments (11.5%), and only the remaining 29.5% of the Vinča signs could represent a symbolic script.

== See also ==
- Gradeshnitsa tablets, located in Bulgaria
- Kamyana Mohyla, Ukraine, petroglyphs from caves used as early as 20th century BC
- Gumelnița–Kodžadermen-Karanovo VI complex
- List of inscriptions in Serbia
- Phaistos Disc
- Prehistoric Romania
- Prehistoric Serbia
- Trojan script
