= Cumidava =

Dacian fortified settlement

- Comidava, Komidava
- Location within Romania
- 45.590524°N 25.469504°E
- Location: Dealul Cetății, Grădiște, Roadeș, Brașov, Romania

Site notes
- Condition: Ruined

Monument istoric
- Reference no.: BV-I-m-A-11284.02

Cumidava (also Comidava, Komidava, Ancient Greek: Κομίδαυα) was originally a Dacian settlement, and later a Roman military camp on the site of the modern city of Râșnov (15 km from Brașov) in Romania.

== Etymology ==
After the Roman conquest of Dacia, the Dacian name Comidava was modified by the Latin writers to Cumidava. (It is common in the Late Latin inscriptions to express the letter "o" by "u", e.g. patrunus instead of patronus 'protector', and Latin rumpia instead of Greek ρομφαια (Rhomphaia) 'Thracian claymore / sword'.)

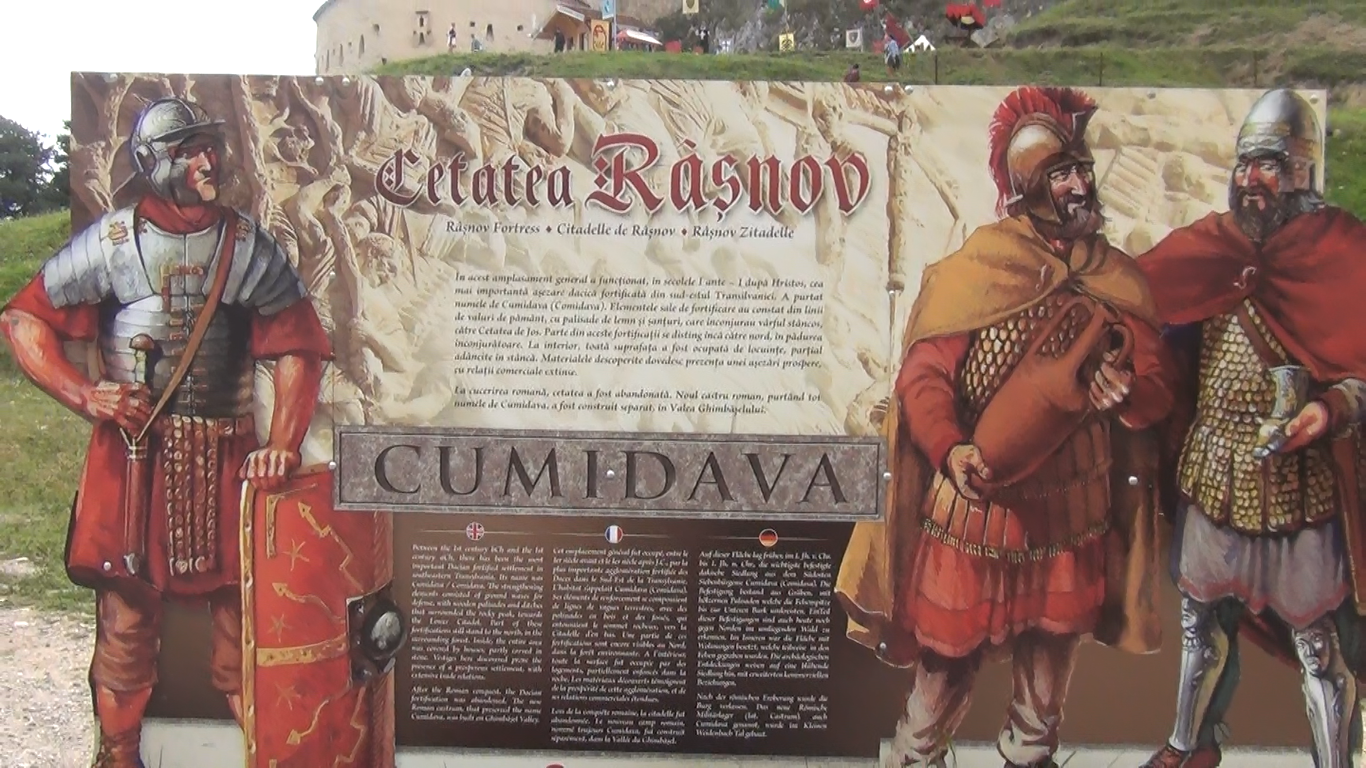

The name Comidava is a compound of dava 'town' and "comi". Scholars' opinions about the meaning of the Dacian word "Comi/Cumi" include:

- 'Desire, love'—a word explained by the ancient Iranian Kamya, with an obscure pronunciation of the "a". The term "Comi" is also contained in the name of the Dacian prince and priest Como-sicus
- 'Lovely' (Romanian Drăgănești)

Another town named Comidava / Cumidava was situated in the Remesiana's territory

== History ==
=== Early references ===
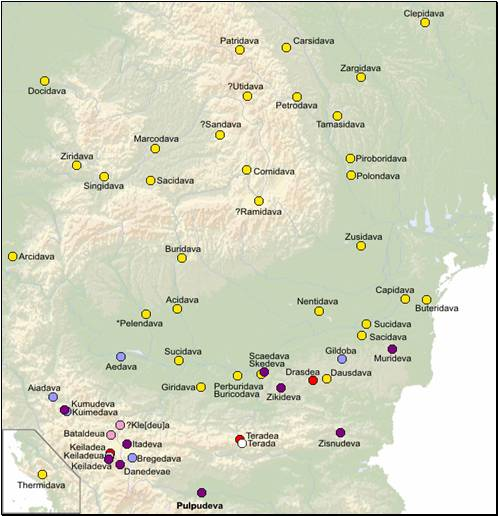
Onomastic range of the Dacian towns with the dava ending, covering Dacia, Moesia, Thrace and Dalmatia

Early references to Cumidava are made by the geographer Ptolemy in his Geographia, in the form Komidava (Ancient Greek: Κομίδαυα).

An inscription on stone dedicated to Julia Avita Mamaea, the mother of the Roman Emperor Alexander Severus (dated 222-235 AD), allows the localization of the Dacian settlement Cumidava in the area of present-day Râșnov.

The archaeological research at Râșnov was initiated in 1856 by Johann Michael Ackner and continued in 1939 by Macrea Mihail who also recorded the presence of Dacian pottery during the digs at the Rasnov Roman camp

The inscription found in 1939:

Iuliae Mameae augustae matri Domini nostri sanctissimi Imperatoris Caesaris Severi Alexandri augusti et castrorum senatusque cohors Vindelicorum Piae fidelis Cumidavensis Alexandrianae ex quaestura sua dedicante la sdio Dominatio legato augusti III Daciarum

After Roman conquest, a part of the kingdom of Dacia was included in the Roman Empire. Septimius Severus (Roman emperor from 193 to 211 AD) pushed Dacia's eastern frontier approximately 10 to 14 kilometers (6.2 to 8.7 miles) east of the Olt River (Limes Transalutanus), constructing a series of 14 camps, over a distance of cca. 225 kilometers (140 mi), beginning at Flămânda on the Danube and stretching northward to Cumidava (now Râșnov).

Cumidava had a military road link with Angustia (now Brețcu), the farthest east of the Roman campus in Dacia.

=== From a Dacian town to a Roman military castrum ===
The Roman military castrum Cumidava was identified at 4 km northwest of the city Râșnov, at the common border with the city of Vulcan.

== Sinaia lead plates ==
Cumidava is mentioned also on the controversial Sinaia lead plates in the form Comidava, which is used as example to debunk the myth about them. According to the director of the Romanian Institute of Archaeology, Alexandru Vulpe, the tablets include only what was known before 1900, for example, the form Comidava from Ptolemy, although now it's known that the correct spelling is Cumidava, as found in 1942 in an inscription.

== See also ==
- Dacia
- Roman Dacia
- List of ancient cities in Dacia
- Dacian davae
