= Gradeshnitsa tablets =

Bulgarian Neolithic artefacts with incised marks

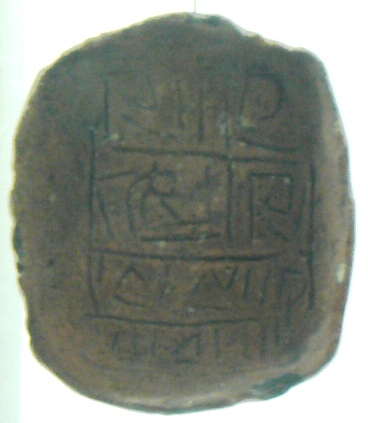
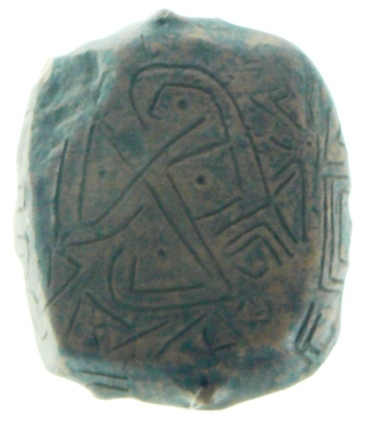
The face and the backside of a copy of the Gradeshnitsa tablet

The Gradeshnitsa tablets (Bulgarian: Плочката от Градешница) or plaques are clay artefacts with incised marks. They were unearthed in 1969 near the village of Gradeshnitsa in the Vratsa Province of north-western Bulgaria.

== Overview ==
Steven R. Fischer has written that "the current opinion is that these earliest Balkan symbols appear to comprise a decorative or emblematic inventory with no immediate relation to articulate speech." That is, they are neither logographs (whole-word signs depicting one object to be spoken aloud) nor phonographs (signs holding a purely phonetic or sound value)." The tablets are dated to the 4th millennium BC and are currently preserved in the Vratsa Archeological Museum of Bulgaria.

== See also ==
- Cucuteni-Trypillian culture
- Sinaia lead plates
- Tărtăria tablets
- Prehistory of Southeastern Europe
- Vinča symbols
