= Galatin =

Galatin Галатин
- Location of Galatin
- Coordinates: 43°24′35″N 23°32′05″E
- Country: Bulgaria
- Provinces (Oblast): Vratsa Province

Government
  - Mayor: Krasimir Geshov
- Elevation: 184 m (604 ft)

Population (2007-01-01)
  - Total: 741
- Time zone: UTC+2 (EET)
  - Summer (DST): UTC+3 (EEST)
- Postal Code: 3071
- Area code: 091188

Galatin (Bulgarian: Галатин) is a village located in northwestern Bulgaria. It is a part of Krivodol Municipality, Vratsa Province.

== Geography ==
The village is located approximately 26 kilometers to the north of town of Vratsa and 7 kilometers from the town of Krividol. It lie at the both banks of a nameless streamlet, but the native people call it "Bara" (Bulgarian: Бара), 'streamlet'. Neighbouring Galatin are the villages of Devene (East), Osen (Southeast), Lesura (North), and Tri kladentsi (Northeast), Baurene (Northwest), and the town of Krivodol (Southwest).
