= Cioara, Hîncești =

Cioara
- Village
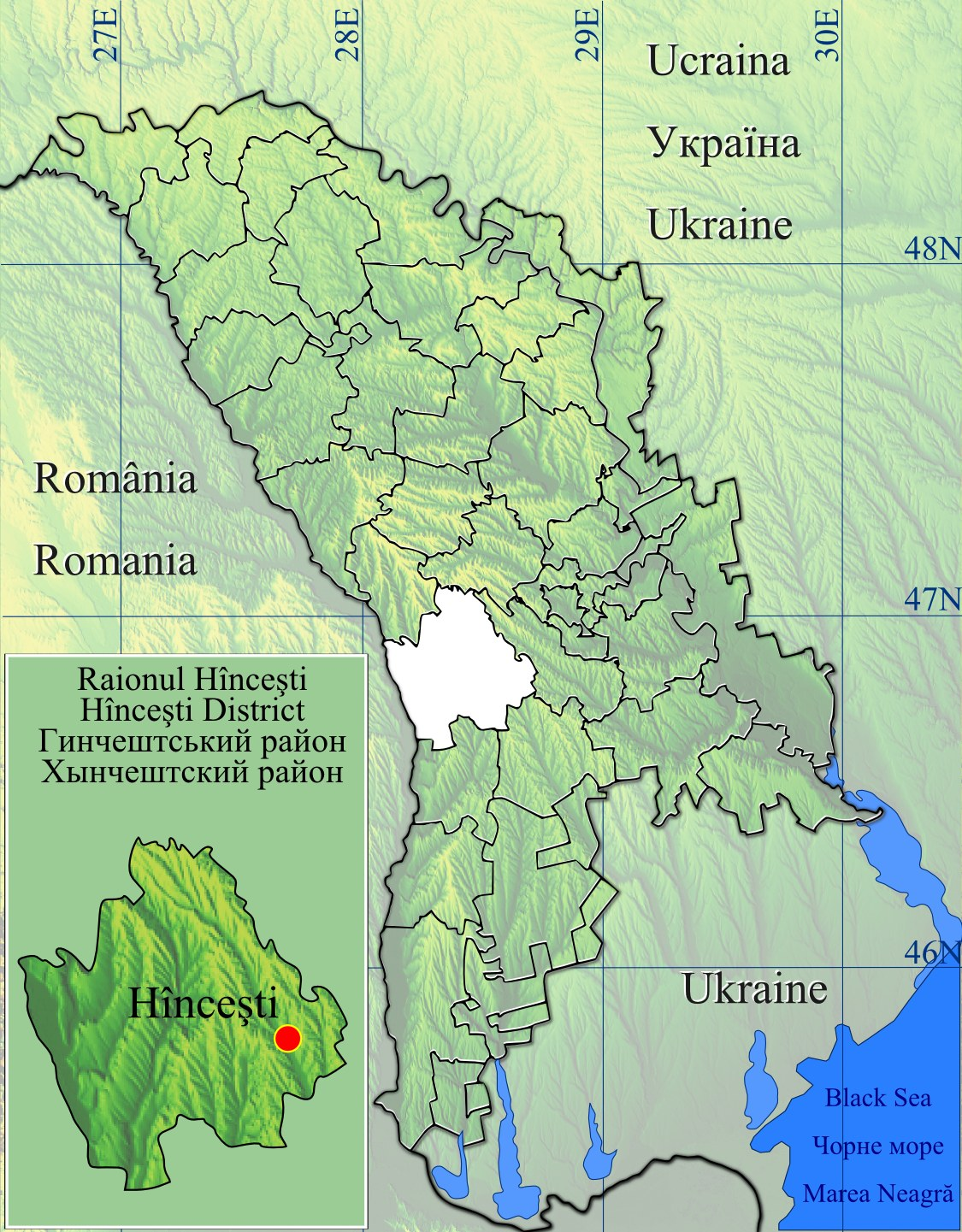
- Location within Hîncești
- Coordinates: 46°43′58″N 28°13′28″E
- Country: Moldova

Government
  - Mayor: Ion Gherela (ACUM)

Area
  - Total: 3,055 km^{2} (1,180 sq mi)

Population (2014 census)
  - Total: 2,148
- Time zone: UTC+2 (EET)
  - Summer (DST): UTC+3 (EEST)
- Postal code: MD-3421

Cioara is a village in Hîncești District, Moldova.
