= Tărtăria tablets =

Neolithic artefacts purported to contain writing

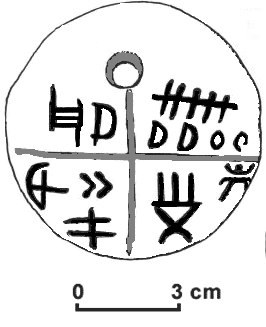
Neolithic clay amulet (retouched), part of the Tărtăria tablets set, supposedly dated to c. 5500–2750 BC and associated with the Turdaș-Vinča culture.

The Tărtăria tablets (Romanian pronunciation: [tərtəˈri.a]) are three tablets, reportedly discovered in 1961 at a Neolithic site in the village of Tărtăria in Săliștea commune (about 30 km (19 mi) from Alba Iulia), from Transylvania.

The tablets bear incised symbols associated with the corpus of the Vinča symbols and have been the subject of considerable controversy among archaeologists, some of whom have argued that the symbols represent the earliest known form of writing in the world. Accurately dating the tablets is difficult as the stratigraphy pertaining to their discovery is disputed, and a heat treatment performed after their discovery has prevented the possibility of directly radiocarbon dating the tablets.

Based on the account of their discovery which associates the tablets with the Vinča culture and on indirect radiocarbon evidence, some scientists propose that the tablets date to around c. 5300 BC, predating Mesopotamian pictographic proto-writing. Some scholars have disputed the authenticity of the account of their discovery, suggesting the tablets are an intrusion from the upper strata of the site. Other scholars, contesting the radiocarbon dates for Neolithic Southeastern Europe, have suggested that Tărtăria signs are in some way related to Mesopotamian proto-writing, particularly Sumerian proto-cuneiform, which they argued was contemporary.

== Discovery ==
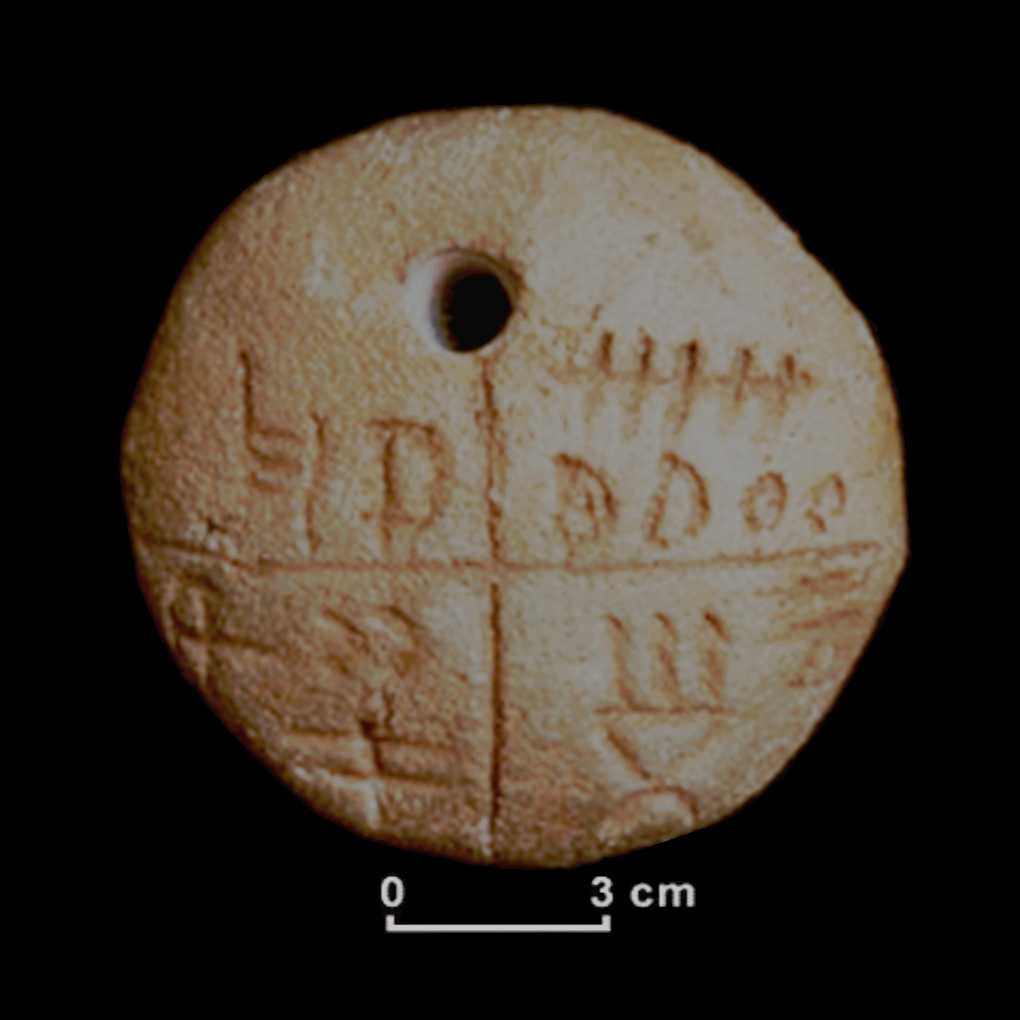
One of the Tărtăria tablets

In 1961, members of a team led by Nicolae Vlassa (an archaeologist at the National Museum of Transylvanian History, Cluj-Napoca) reportedly unearthed three inscribed but unfired clay tablets, twenty-six clay and stone figurines, a shell bracelet, and the burnt, broken, and disarticulated bones of an adult female sometimes referred to as "Milady Tărtăria".

There is no consensus on the interpretation of the burial, but it has been suggested that the body was likely that of a respected local wise-person, shaman, or spirit-medium.

=== Disputed authenticity ===
It is disputed whether the tablets were actually found at the reported site, and Vlassa never discussed the circumstances of the find of the stratigraphy.

The authenticity of the engravings has also been disputed. A recent claim of forgery is based on the similarity between some of the symbols and reproductions of Sumerian symbols in popular Romanian literature available at the time of the discovery.

== Description ==
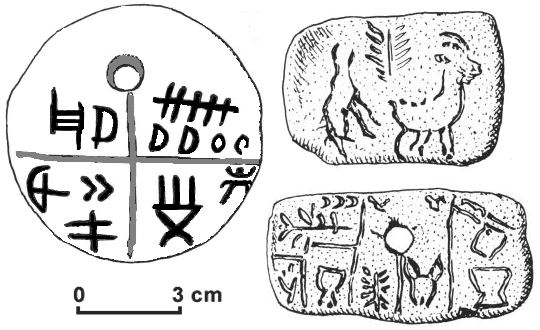
Illustrations of each of three tablets

Two of the tablets are rectangular and the third is round. They are all small, the round one being only 6 cm (2 1/2 in) across, and two—the round one and one rectangular tablet—have holes drilled through them. All three have symbols inscribed on only one face. The unpierced rectangular tablet depicts a horned animal, an unclear figure, and a vegetal motif such as a branch or tree. The others consist of a variety of mainly abstract symbols.

=== Dating ===
Workers at the conservation department of the Cluj museum baked the originally unbaked clay tablets in order to preserve them, making it impossible to directly date the tablets with the carbon 14 method.

The tablets are generally believed to have belonged to the Vinča-Turdaș culture, which was originally thought to have originated around 2700 BCE by Serbian and Romanian archaeologists. The discovery garnered attention from the archeological world because it predates the first Minoan writing, the oldest known writing in Europe.

Subsequent radiocarbon dating of the other Tărtăria finds, extended by association also to the tablets, pushed the date of the site (and therefore of the whole Vinča culture) to approximately 5500 BCE, the time of the early Eridu phase of the Sumerian civilization in Mesopotamia. Still, this is disputed in light of apparently contradictory stratigraphic evidence.

It has been controversially claimed that if the symbols are indeed a form of writing, then writing in the Danubian culture would far predate the earliest Sumerian cuneiform script or Egyptian hieroglyphs. Thus, they would be the world's earliest known form of writing.

== Historical context ==
=== Hypothesis of Danubian culture ===
The term Danubian culture was proposed by V. Gordon Childe to describe the first agrarian society in central and eastern Europe. This hypothesis and the appearance of writing in this space is supported by Marco Merlini, Harald Haarmann, Joan Marler, Gheorghe Lazarovici, and many others.

=== Proposed links to Sumerian culture ===
Colin Renfrew argues that the apparent similarities with Sumerian symbols are deceptive:

"To me, the comparison made between the signs on the Tărtăria tablets and those of proto-literate Sumeria carry very little weight. They are all simple pictographs, and a sign for a goat in one culture is bound to look much like the sign for a goat in another. To call these Balkan signs 'writing' is perhaps to imply that they had an independent significance of their own communicable to another person without oral contact. This I doubt."

=== Possibly related finds in the region ===
==== Artifacts bearing Vinča symbols ====
The Vinča symbols have been known since the late 19th century excavation by Zsófia Torma (1832–1899) at the Neolithic site of Turdaș (Hungarian: Tordos) in Transylvania, at the time part of Austria-Hungary, the type site of the Tordos culture, a late, regional variation of the Vinča culture.

==== Other artifacts ====
This group of artifacts, including the tablets, have some relation with the culture developed in the Black Sea – Aegean Sea area. Similar artefacts have been found in Bulgaria (e.g. the Gradeshnitsa tablets) and northern Greece (the Dispilio Tablet). The material and the style used for the Tartaria artefacts show some similarities to those used in the Cyclades area, as two of the statuettes are made of alabaster.

== Purpose and meaning ==
The meaning (if any) of the symbols is unknown, and their nature has been the subject of much debate.

=== Writing system ===
Scholars who conclude that the inscribed symbols are writing are basing their assessment on a few assumptions that are not universally endorsed:

- The existence of similar signs on other artifacts of the Danube civilization suggest that there was an inventory of standard shapes used by scribes.
- The symbols are highly standardised and have a rectilinear shape comparable to that manifested by archaic writing systems.
- The information communicated by each character was specific, with an unequivocal meaning.
- The inscriptions are sequenced in rows, whether horizontal, vertical, or circular.

If they do comprise a script, it is not known what kind of writing system they represent. Vlassa interpreted one of the Tărtăria tablets as a hunting scene and the other two with signs as a kind of primitive writing similar to the early pictograms of the Sumerians. Some archaeologists who support the idea that they do represent writing, notably Marija Gimbutas, have proposed that they are fragments of a system dubbed the Old European Script.

=== Non-linguistic signs ===
One problem is the lack of independent indications of literacy existing in the Balkans at this period. Sarunas Milisauskas comments that "it is extremely difficult to demonstrate archaeologically whether a corpus of symbols constitutes a writing system" and notes that the first known writing systems were all developed by early states to facilitate record-keeping in complex organised societies in the Middle East and Mediterranean. There is no evidence of organised states in the European Neolithic, thus it is unlikely they would have needed the administrative systems facilitated by writing. David Anthony notes that Chinese characters were first used for ritual and commemorative purposes associated with the 'sacred power' of kings; it is possible that a similar usage accounts for the Tărtăria symbols. Some scholars have suggested that the symbols may have been used as marks of ownership or as the focus of religious rituals.

An alternative suggestion is that they may have been merely uncomprehending imitations of more advanced cultures, although this explanation is made rather unlikely by the great antiquity of the tablets—there were no known literate cultures at the time from which the symbols could have been adopted.

Others consider the pictograms to be accompanied by random scribbles.

== See also ==
- Gradeshnitsa tablets
- Dispilio Tablet
- Sitovo inscription
- Prehistoric Romania
- Prehistory of Transylvania
- Cucuteni–Trypillian culture

== Sources ==
- Evans, A (1895), Cretan pictographs and prae-Phoenician script. With an account of a sepulchral deposit at Hagios Onuphrios near Phaestos in its relation primitive Cretan and Aegean culture, G.P.Putnams sons, p. 166
- Falkenstein, A. (1965) Zu den Tontafeln aus Târtària, Germania 43 : 269–273.
- Gimbutas, Marija (2001) [1999]. Dexter, Miriam Robbins (ed.). The Living Goddesses. Berkeley: University of California Press. ISBN 9780520229150.
- Haarmann, H (1990), "Writing from Old Europe", The Journal of Indo-European Studies
- Jongbloed, Dominique (2011), Civilisations antédiluviennes (in French), Alphée ed
- Kenanidis, I.; Papakitsos, G. (2015) A Comparative Linguistic Study about the Sumerian Influence on the Creation of the Aegean Scripts.
- Klára, Friedrich The Mystery of Tatárlaka (Dobogó-Historical journal, 2004/9.-2005/6.)
- Klára, Friedrich (2005) - Szakács Gábor: Graved in stone, carved in wood...
- Makkay, J (1969), "The Late Neolithic Tordos Group of Signs", Alba Regia, pp. 9–50.
- Makkay, J (1984), Early Stamp Seals in South-East Europe, Budapest.
- Mandics, Gy., Záhonyi, A.: The message oh Tartaria and Tordos. Fríg (Pilisvörösvár, Hungary), 2018.
- Merlini, Marco; Lazarovici, Gheorghe (2008). "Settling discovery circumstances, dating and utilization of the Tărtăria tablets" (PDF). Acta Terrae Septemcastrensis. VII. Sibiu, Romania: Lucian Blaga University of Sibiu. ISSN 1583-1817.
- Paliga, Sorin (1993). "The tablets of Tărtăria. An enigma? A reconsideration and further perspectives". Dialogues d'histoire ancienne. 19 (1): 9–43. doi:10.3406/dha.1993.2073.
- Schmandt-Besserat, Denise (1992) Before Writing, University of Texas Press, Austin. Volume I: From Counting to Cuneiform.
- Vaiman, A. A. (1994) On the Quasi-Sumerian tablets from Tartaria. Археологические вести. Спб, 1994. Вып. 3. Аннотации. — ИИМК РАН
- Winn, Sham MM (1973), The Signs of the Vinca Culture.
- Winn, Sham MM (1981), Pre-writing in Southeast Europe: The Sign System of the Vinca culture, BAR.
