= Gradeshnitsa =

Village in Montana, Bulgaria

Gradeshnitsa Градешница
- Location of Gradeshnitsa
- Coordinates: 43°29′N 23°29′E
- Country: Bulgaria
- Provinces (Oblast): Vratsa

Government
  - Mayor: Magdalin Salkov
- Elevation: 189 m (620 ft)

Population (2005)
  - Total: 655
- Time zone: UTC+2 (EET)
  - Summer (DST): UTC+3 (EEST)
- Postal Code: 3074
- Area code: 091186
- License plate: B

Gradeshnitsa (Градешница) is a village of the Vratsa Province, Bulgaria.

The village is notable for the Gradeshnitsa monastery (situated 1.5 km west of the village), and for the Neolithic Gradeshnitsa tablets now kept in Vratsa museum.One of the tablets is still kept on display in the center next to the mayor building.There were 2 attempts to burn down the monastery due to unknown reasons.

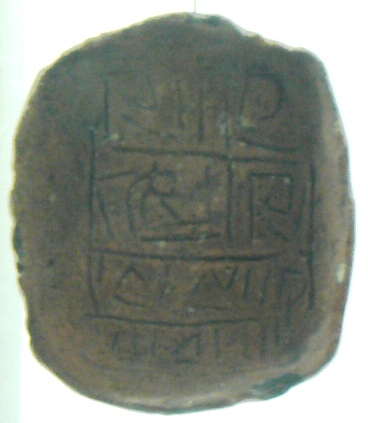
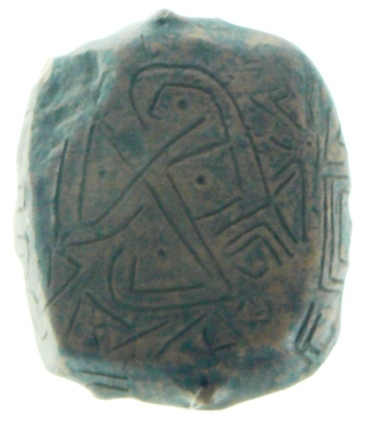
Gradeshnitsa-tablet
