= Săliștea =

- Commune
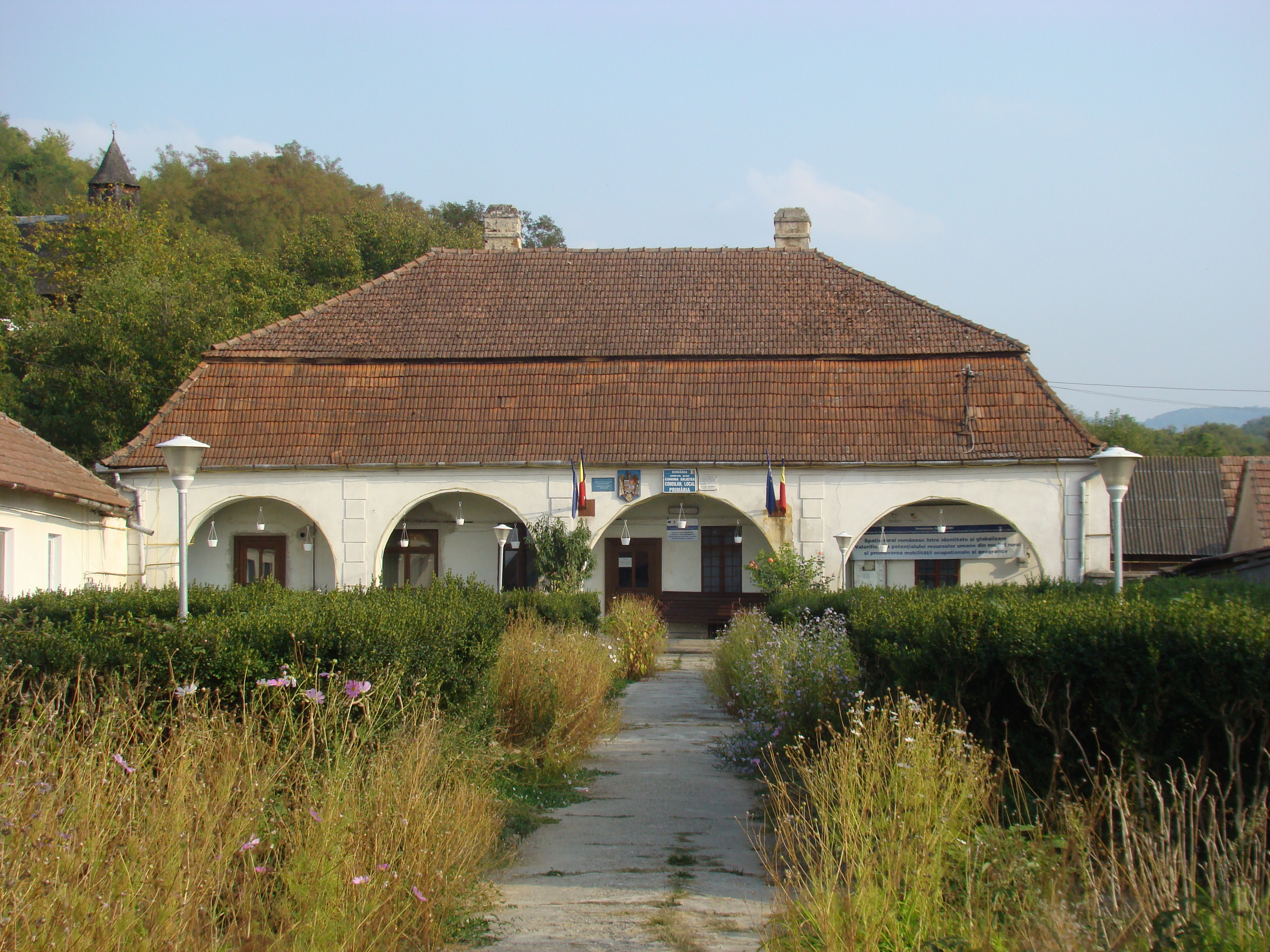
- Săliștea town hall, built in the 18th century as the mansion of the Barcsay family

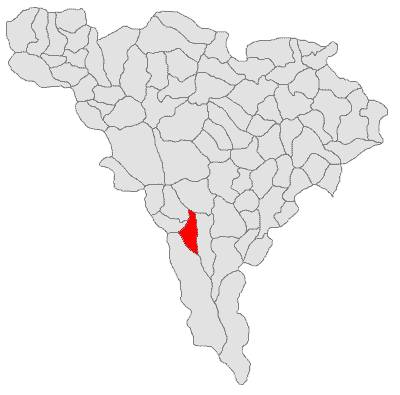
- Location in Alba County

- Location in Romania
- Coordinates: 45°54′N 23°24′E
- Country: Romania
- County: Alba

Government
  - Mayor (2020–2024): Aurel Emil Stănilă (PNL)
- Area: 60.11 km^{2} (23.21 sq mi)
- Elevation: 359 m (1,178 ft)
- Population (2021-12-01): 2,155
  - Density: 35.85/km^{2} (92.85/sq mi)
- Time zone: UTC+02:00 (EET)
  - Summer (DST): UTC+03:00 (EEST)
- Postal code: 517655
- Area code: +40 x58
- Vehicle reg.: AB
- Website: comuna-salistea.ro

Săliștea (German: Tschorren; Hungarian: Alsócsóra), known as Cioara until 1965, is a commune located in Alba County, Transylvania, Romania. The old name of Cioara is still widely used, especially by local residents.

It is composed of four villages: Mărgineni, Săliștea, Săliștea-Deal, and Tărtăria (Alsótatárlaka).

== Geography ==
Săliștea is located near the Mureș River in the southwestern part of Alba County. The centre of the commune is situated 5 km (3.1 mi) north of a main Romanian National Road, namely the DN7, to which is connected by the county road DJ705E. The nearest cities are Sebeș (21 km), Cugir (25 km) and the county capital, Alba Iulia (27 km).

The bordering communes are Blandiana in the north, Vințu de Jos in the north-east, Pianu in the east, the town of Cugir in the west and Șibot in the south.

The relief is dominated by the low terraces of the river Mureș in the north and the high plateau and several hills in the south. The highest hills, Globul, Hălmul and Coasta Răchitii, are about 700–900 m (2,300–3,000 ft) high. Other hills are Văratecul (630 m), Dealul Mare (452 m), Dealul Ciorii (424 m), Dealul Calului (389 m) and Munceii Rotunzi (341 m).

The mean annual temperatures range between 5 and 9 °C (41 and 48 °F).

== History ==
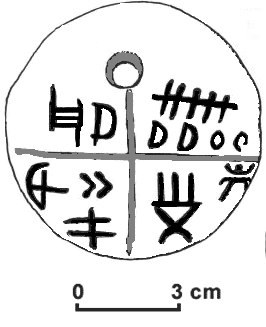
Neolithic clay amulet (retouched), part of the Tărtăria tablets set, dated to 5500–5300 BC and associated with the Turdaș-Vinča culture. The Vinča symbols on it predate the proto-Sumerian pictographic script. Discovered in 1961 at Tărtăria by the archaeologist Nicolae Vlassa.

The oldest traces of human activity in Săliștea date back to the Vinča culture of the Middle Neolithic. The Tărtăria tablets dated 5300 BC were discovered in the village of Tărtăria, part of the Săliștea commune, in 1961 by a team of Romanian archaeologists led by Nicolae Vlassa.

Other archaeological findings indicate the existence of a Dacian settlement in this area. The main discovery was a series of 62 pieces of silver artifacts, found in 1820 by Matei Molodeț, a villager from Săliștea. Several coins dated back to the times of Roman Dacia were also found by archaeologists.

The first attestation of a village in the area occupied today by Săliștea dates back to 4 November 1310, when by order of king Charles I of Hungary, the village of Archișul Românesc (Romanian Archiș) was donated to Count Reneriu from Vințu de Jos. The other village, Drejman, was attested in a document from 29 June 1375, when by order of king Louis I of Hungary, villa Drasman is inherited by Reneriu's granddaughters.

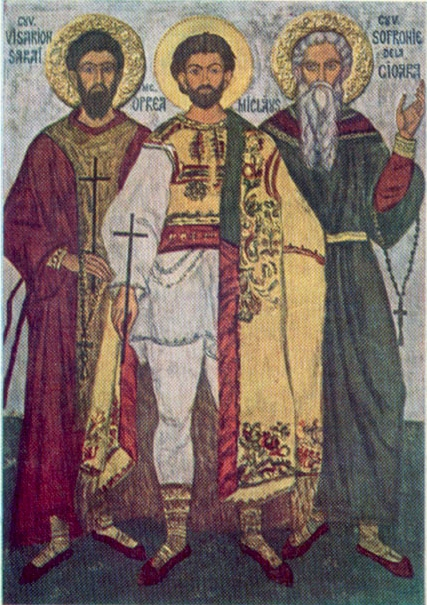
Picture of Sofronie of Cioara (third from left to right)

On 23 May 1458 Archișul Românesc and Drejman were united to form the village of Cioara, named after the stream Cioara, a tributary of river Mureș. It is possible that the stream Cioara was named after the famous inn close to the village of Archișul Românesc and Drejman, that had as an emblem a crow (in Romanian: cioară or corb). The emblem of the inn was also the emblem of the Barcsay noble family from Bârcea Mare, Hunedoara, that was attested in this area in several documents from 1458 and 1462, and became the dominant noble family in Săliștea starting from 1508.

The village of Cioara is linked to Sofronie of Cioara, the Eastern Orthodox Monk and Saint of the Romanian Orthodox Church who, between the autumn of 1759 and the spring of 1761, led the peaceful uprising of the Romanian Orthodox population against the Habsburg policy of encouraging all Romanians to join the Greek-Catholic Church. In 1701, the Emperor Leopold I decreed Transylvania's Orthodox Church to be one with the Roman Catholic Church. Sofronie's peaceful uprising advocated for freedom of worship and the right of the Romanian population in Transylvania to have a Romanian Orthodox bishop. As a response to Sofronie's movement, the Austrian military commander systematically destroyed the monasteries in Transylvania that had served as centres of the uprising, including the one in Cioara. In the end however, The Orthodox achieved a notable victory: recognition by the court of Vienna of the legal existence of their church and the appointment of a bishop in person of Dionisije Novaković.

Several historians also showed the involvement of several villagers from Cioara in the Revolt of Horea, Cloșca and Crișan and the Transylvanian Memorandum movement.

A number of 550 inhabitants of Cioara fought during World War I in the Austro-Hungarian Army and most of them as volunteers in the Romanian Army in the second part of the war. Sixty-five of them were reported dead in action.

On 1 December 1918, the Great National Assembly of Alba Iulia proclaimed the Union of Transylvania with Romania. Several people from Cioara took part in the Assembly, including the local priest, Constantin Oancea, who was one of the speakers in the Assembly.

During World War II, more than 250 people from Cioara fought in the Romanian Army, of which 45 died in action. After the war, 65 children from Bessarabia, including their teacher, found refuge in the commune.

The name of the commune was changed in 1965 from Cioara to Săliștea.

== Population ==
Historical population
| Year | Pop. | ±% |
|---|---|---|
| 1850 | 1,784 | — |
| 1880 | 2,195 | +23.0% |
| 1900 | 2,578 | +17.4% |
| 1920 | 2,865 | +11.1% |
| 1941 | 3,045 | +6.3% |
| 1977 | 3,007 | −1.2% |
| 1992 | 2,374 | −21.1% |
| 2002 | 2,374 | +0.0% |
| 2011 | 2,197 | −7.5% |
| 2021 | 2,155 | −1.9% |
Source: INS, Census data

According to the 2002 census, there were 2,374 people living in Săliștea (100% Romanians), of which 1,252 in the centre of the commune, 745 in Tărtăria, 309 in Săliștea Deal, and 77 in Mărgineni. At the 2011 census, the population had decreased to 2,197. At the 2021 census, there were 2,155 inhabitants in the commune, of which 2,039 were Romanians.

== Natives ==
- Mircea Miclea (b. 1963), professor and psychologist
- David Prodan (1902–1992), historian
- Sofronie of Cioara, Eastern Orthodox Monk and Saint of the Romanian Orthodox Church

== See also ==
- Tărtăria tablets
