= Parvenets, Plovdiv Province =

Parvenets Първенец
- Village
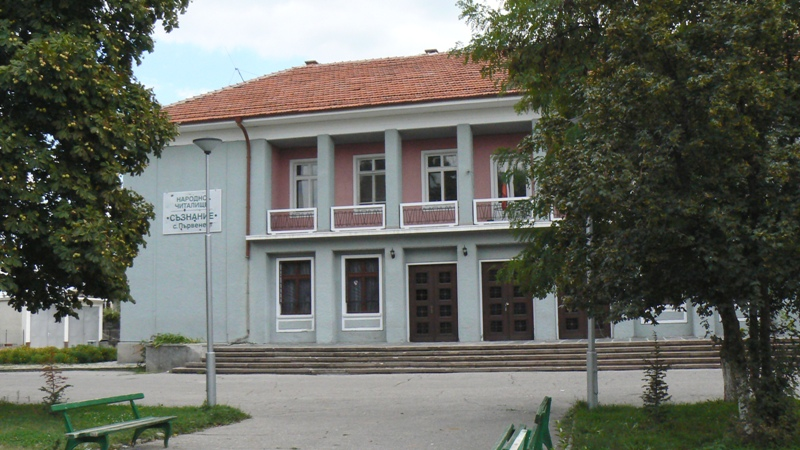
- The chitalishte of Parvenets

- Location of Parvenets
- Coordinates: 42°04′28″N 24°39′47″E
- Country: Bulgaria
- Provinces (Oblast): Plovdiv Province

Government
  - Mayor: Georgi Stamenov (Ind.)

Area
  - Total: 16.491 km^{2} (6.367 sq mi)
- Elevation: 220 m (720 ft)

Population (2024)
  - Total: 3,635
  - Density: 220.4/km^{2} (570.9/sq mi)
- Time zone: UTC+2 (EET)
  - Summer (DST): UTC+3 (EEST)
- Postal Code: 4110

Parvenets (Bulgarian: Първенец [pɐrvɛˈnɛt͡s]) is a village in the Plovdiv Province, southern Bulgaria. As 2024, the village has 3,635 inhabitants.

== Geography ==
Parvenets has a strategic situation in the Upper Thracian Plain, where it meets the northern foothills of the Chernatitsa Ridge of the Rhodope Mountains at an altitude of about 420 m. It lies on the river Parvenetska reka, a right tributary of the Maritsa. The village falls within the transitional continental climatic zone. The soils are mainly alluvial and cinnamon forest.

Administratively, Parvenets is situated in Rodopi Municipality in the southern part of Plovdiv Province. The village has a territory of 16.491 km^{2}, bordering the villages of Markovo to the east, Hrabrino to the south, Brestovitsa to the west, as well as the Komatevo neighbourhood of Plovdiv some 3 km to the northeast. It lies on the third class III-862 road that links the provincial center of Plovdiv with the spa village of Mihalkovo in the Rhodope Mountains.

== History and landmarks ==
Parvenets has a rich history. During the different periods it was called Varlovo, Dermendere, Ferdinandovo. From the Antiquity and the Middle Ages and especially during the Bulgarian National Revival of the 19th century the village was a center of dynamic economic and cultural life. In 1846 the Gyumyushgerdan brothers inaugurated the second factory in Bulgaria after the textile enterprise of Dobri Zhelyazkov in Sliven. After the Liberation of Bulgaria in 1878 the village was part of the autonomous province of Eastern Rumelia. On 25 and 26 July 1885 during the meeting of the Bulgarian Secret Central Revolutionary Committee in the village Zahari Stoyanov was chosen a new chairman and the decision for the Unification of Bulgaria was taken, which successfully took place several weeks later.

There are two churches, the Church of St Fotinia built between 1700 and 1830, and the Church of St Constantine and Helen constructed in 1879. The local cultural center, known in Bulgarian as a chitalishte, was established after the 1878 and its current building was constructed in 1961. The local school was established in 1856–1857. The main village fair takes place on 21 May.

== Economy ==
The village lies in a fertile agricultural region and has one of the largest vegetable markets in Bulgaria. The main crops include vegetables, grapes and orchards. There are several small industrial workshops. There is a hail suppression center in Parvenets.
