= Parvenetska reka =

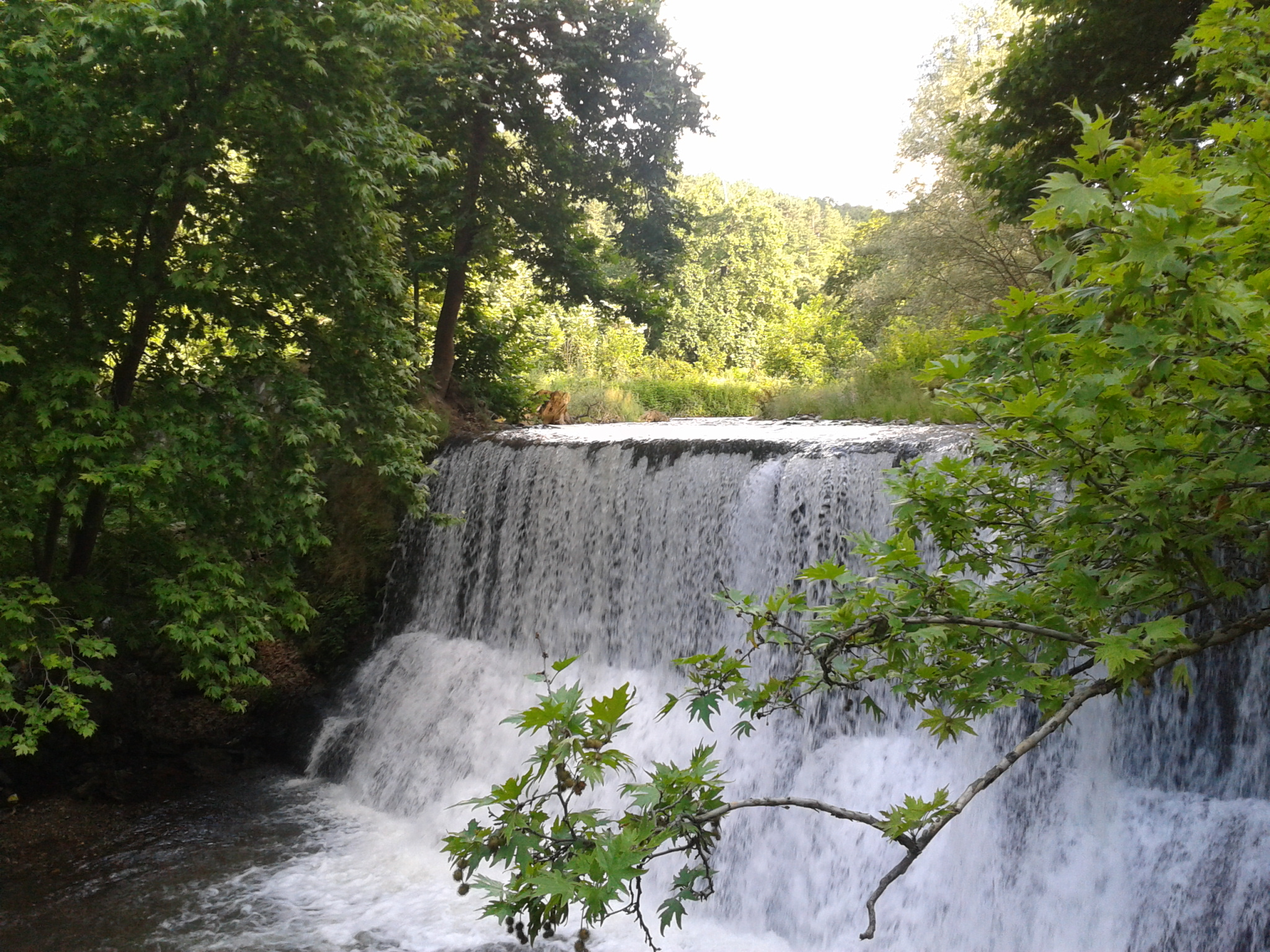

Location
- Country: Bulgaria

Physical characteristics
- Source
  - location: western Rhodope Mountains
  - coordinates: 42°53′17.16″N 24°31′51.96″E
  - elevation: 1,816 m (5,958 ft)
- Mouth
  - location: Maritsa
  - coordinates: 42°8′33″N 24°41′52.08″E
  - elevation: 164 m (538 ft)
- Length: 37 km (23 mi)
- Basin size: 217 km^{2} (84 sq mi)

Basin features
- Progression: Maritsa→ Aegean Sea

The Parvenetska reka (Bulgarian: Първенецка река) is a 37 km-long river in southern Bulgaria, a right tributary of the river Maritsa.

The river takes its source under the name Ribnevo dere at an altitude of 1,816 m some 500 m west of the summit of Modar (1,992 m) in the Chernatisa ridge of western Rhodope mountain range. It flows a north-northeastern direction in a deep forested valley. After the Tamrash State Forestry it is also known as the Tamrashka reka. Downstream of the confluence with its largest tributary, the Lilkovska reka, the river enters in a deep dramatic gorge until the village of Hrabrino. At the village of Parvenets, it enters the Upper Thracian Plain, where the riverbed is corrected with protective dikes. It flows into the Maritsa at an altitude of 164 m in the western neighbourhoods of Bulgaria's second largest city, Plovdiv.

Its drainage basin covers a territory of 217 km^{2} or 0.4% of Maritsa's total and borders the drainage basins of the Chepelarska reka to the east and southeast and the Vacha to the west and southwest, both right tributaries of the Maritsa.

The Parvenetska reka has predominantly rain-snow feed with high water in April–May and low water in August–September. The average annual flow at Hrabrino is 1.62 m^{3}/s.

The river flows entirely in Plovdiv Province. There are three settlements along its course: the villages of Hrabrino and Parvenets in Rodopi Municipality and the city of Plovdiv. A 10.9 km stretch of the third class III-862 road Plovdiv–Lilkovo follows its valley between Parvenets and the intersection to Boykovo. Its waters are used for irrigation in the Upper Thracian Plain, as well as for industrial supply.
