= Sitovo, Plovdiv Province =

Sitovo Ситово
- Village
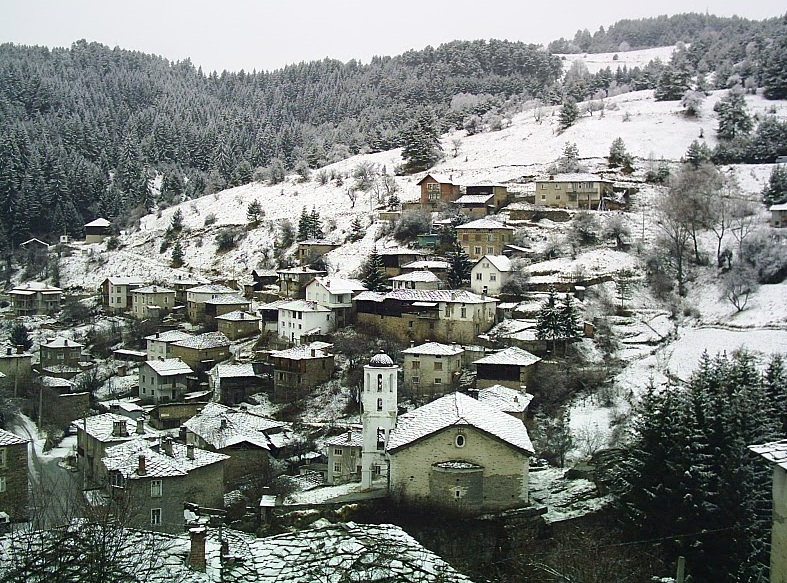

- Location of Sitovo
- Coordinates: 41°56′N 24°37′E
- Country: Bulgaria
- Provinces (Oblast): Plovdiv Province

Government
  - Mayor: Plamen Spasov (GERB)

Area
  - Total: 35.509 km^{2} (13.710 sq mi)
- Elevation: 1,365 m (4,478 ft)

Population (2013-12-31)
  - Total: 61
  - Density: 1.7/km^{2} (4.4/sq mi)
- Time zone: UTC+2 (EET)
  - Summer (DST): UTC+3 (EEST)
- Postal Code: 4104

Sitovo (Bulgarian: Ситово) is a small mountain village in Plovdiv Province, southern Bulgaria. It has 61 inhabitants as of 2024.

== Geography ==
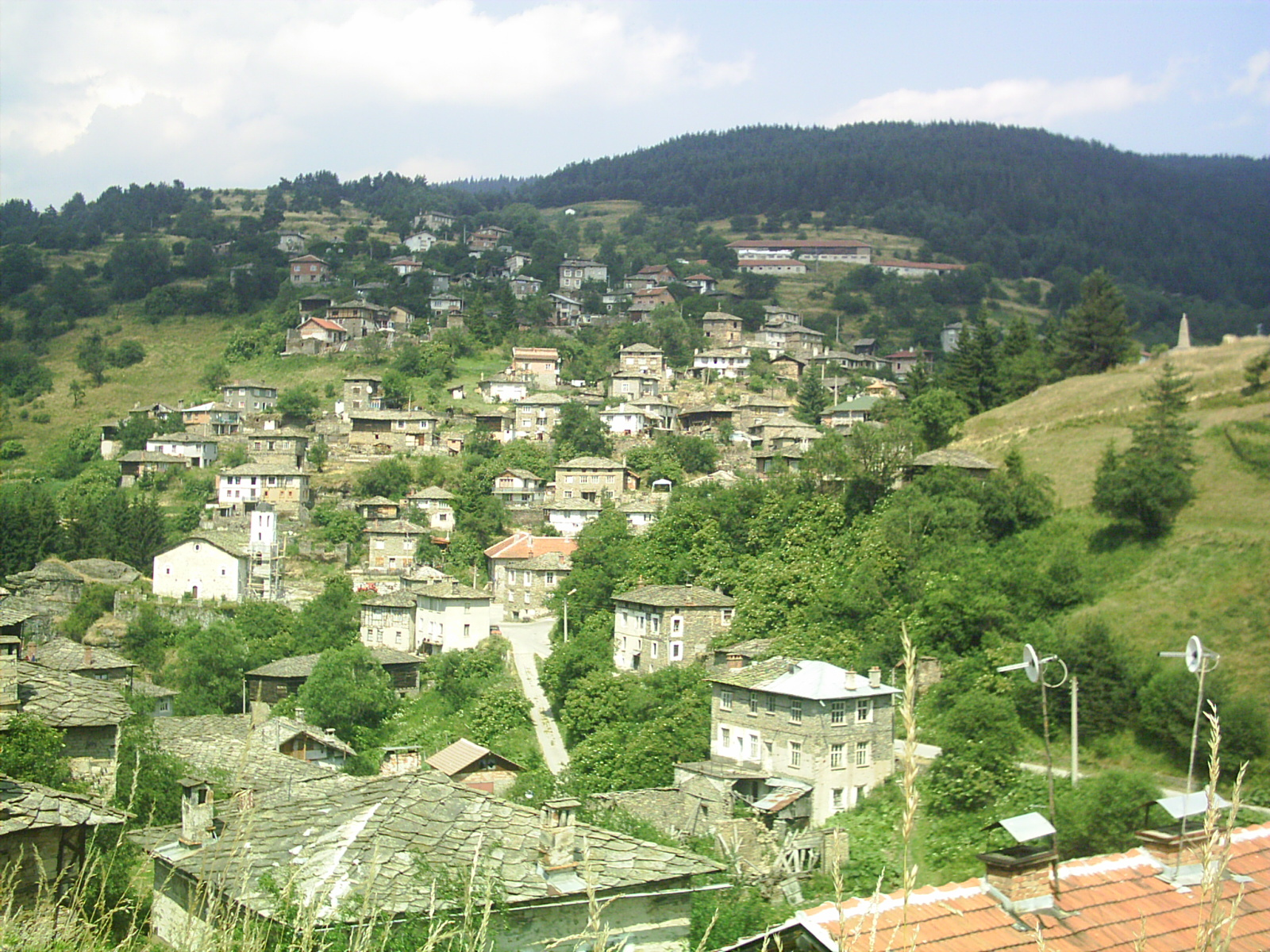
A view of Sitovo

The village is situated on the northern part of the central Rhodope Mountains. The river Dormusheva reka, the largest tributary of the Parvenetska reka of the Maritsa drainage, runs through the village. About three kilometers downstream to the north of the village is the Sitovo Waterfall. There is a water spring near the village.

Administratively, Sitovo is situated in Rodopi Municipality in the southern part of Plovdiv Province. The village has a territory of 35.509 km^{2}. It is accessible via a road that diverts at the Sitovo Waterfall from the third class III-862 road that links the city of Plovdiv with the spa village of Mihalkovo. The closest settlements include the villages of Lilkovo to the southwest, Boykovo to the north, and Kosovo, Plovdiv Province to the east. The provincial center Plovdiv is located about 35 km to the north.

== History and culture ==
The area of the villages has been settled for at least 2 thousand years and was inhabited by the Thracian tribe Bessi and the part of the Thracian Odrysian kingdom. From that period dates the yet untranslated Sitovo inscription, situated on the wall of a rock shelter in the vicinity of the village, and dated to between 300 and 100 BCE. Close to Sitovo is also located the ancient rock sanctuary and fortress Studa Grada. During the Middle Ages the region was part of the First and Second Bulgarian Empires, as well as the Byzantine Empire, before it was conquered by the Ottomans during the course of the Bulgarian–Ottoman wars in the second half of the 14th century. After the Liberation of Bulgaria in 1878 it was initially part of the autonomous province of Eastern Rumelia until the Unification of Bulgaria in 1885.

One of the first schools in that region of the Rhodope Mountains was constructed in Sitovo in 1834. There are two churches in the village, the Church of St Petka in the center built in 1848 and the Church of the Virgin Mary on the peak above Sitovo, constructed several years after the first one. There many preserved old houses with Bulgarian National Revival architecture. The main village fair is held on 15 August.

== Gallery ==
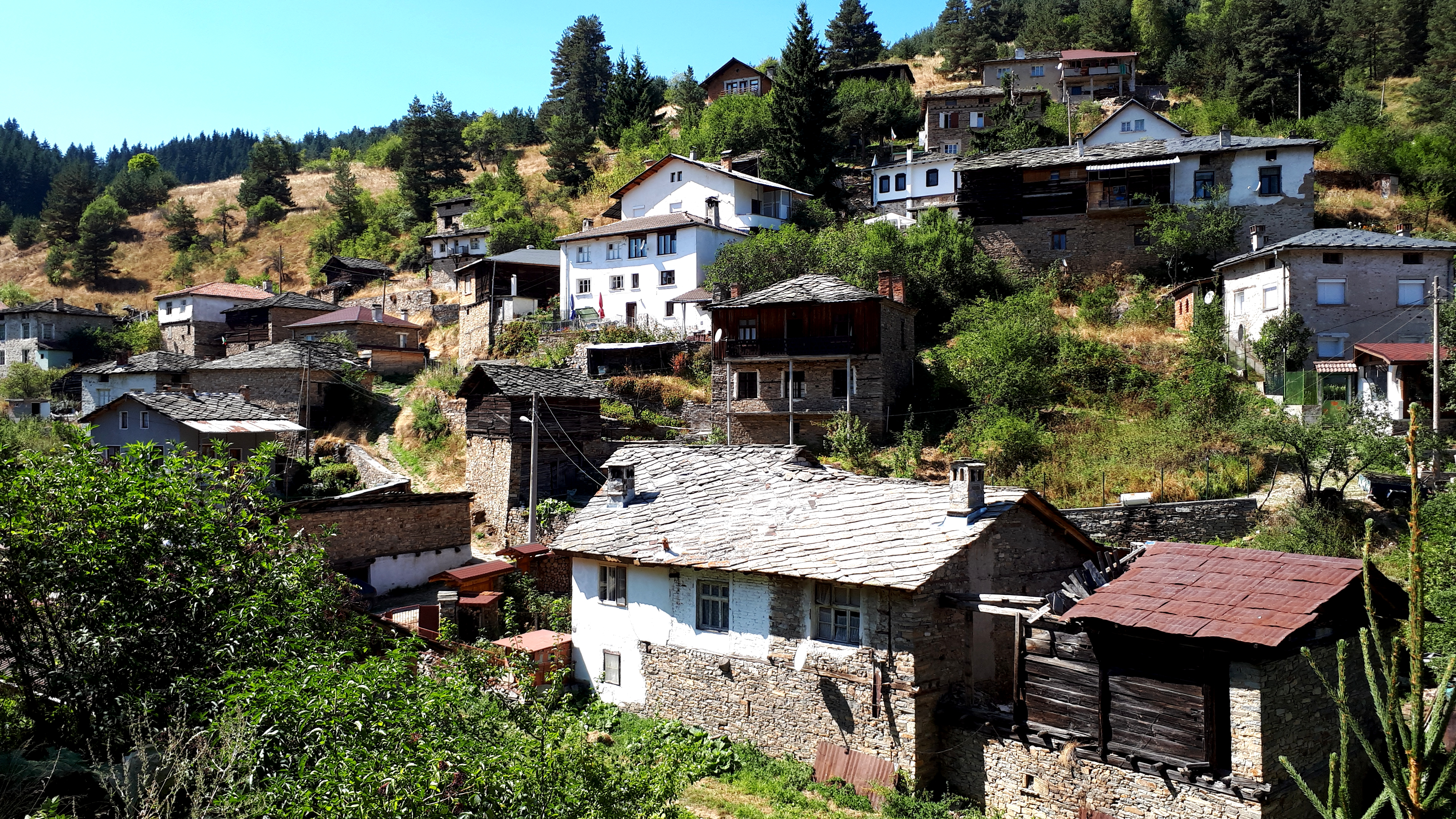
A view of the village

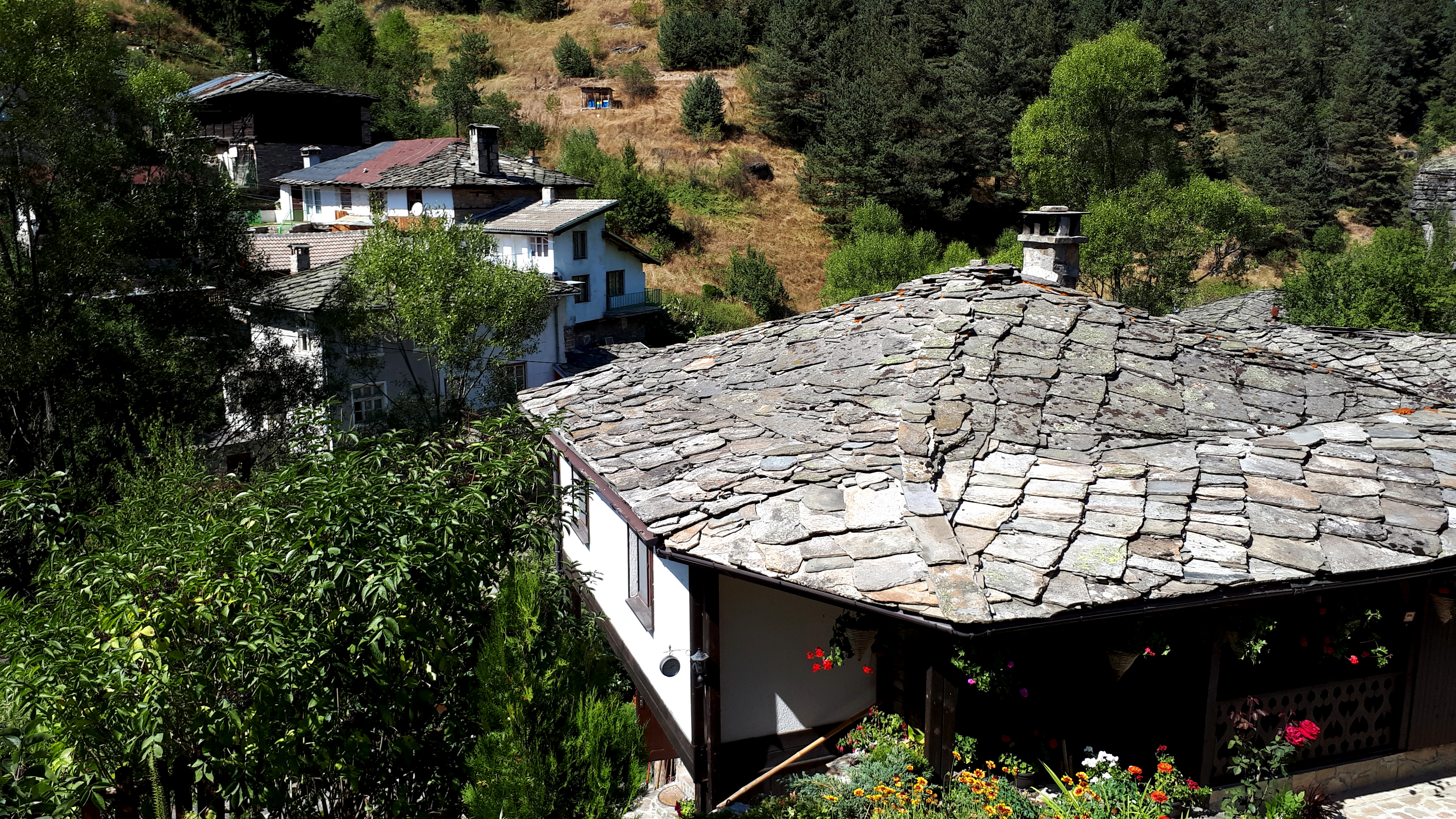
Rooftops of Sitovo

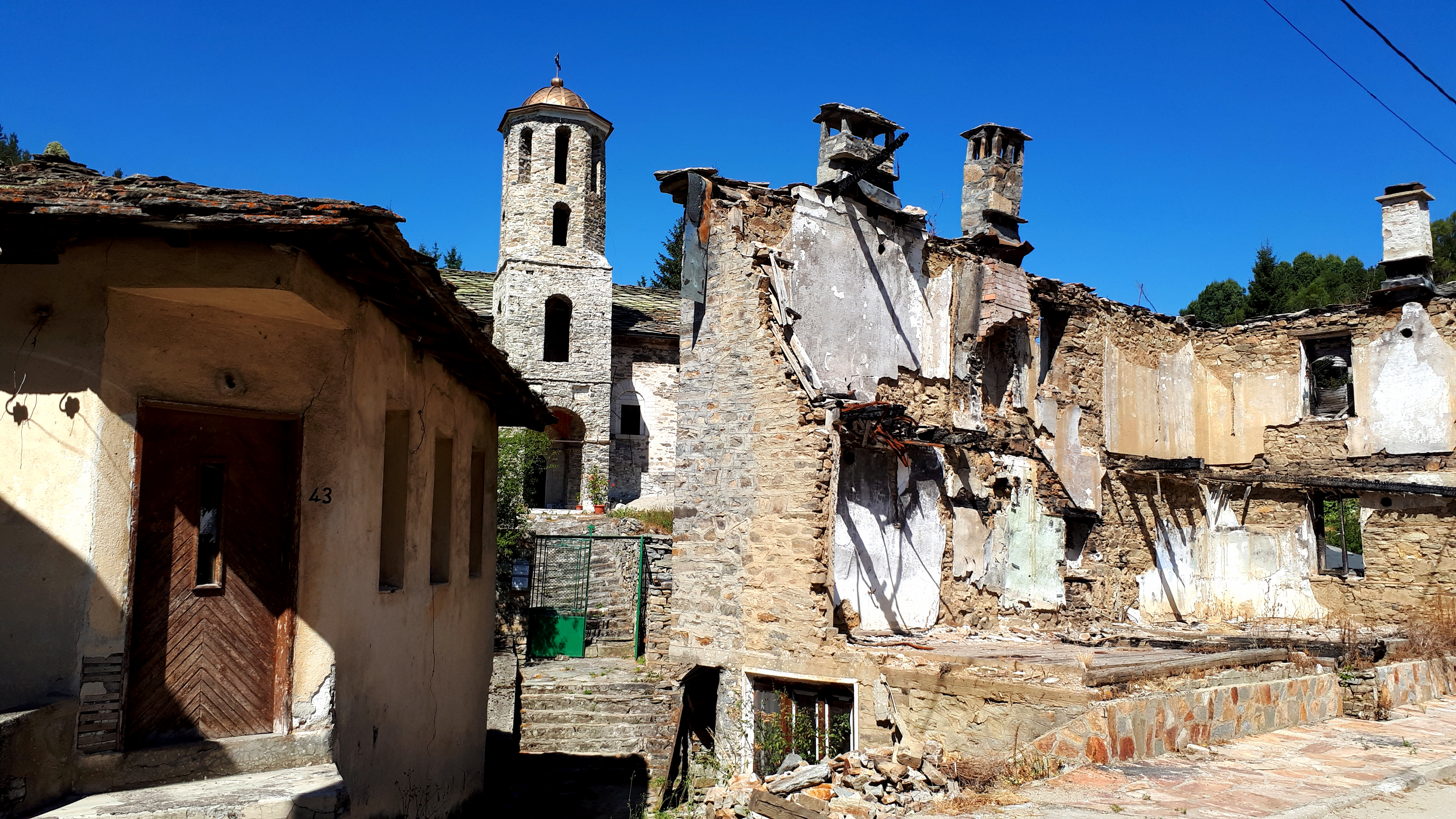
The belfry of the Church of St Petka
