= Brestovitsa =

Brestovitsa (Bulgarian: Брестовица) may refer to several villages in Bulgaria:

- Brestovitsa, Rousse Province and
- Brestovitsa, Plovdiv Province
