= Sitovo =

Sitovo (Bulgarian: Ситово, pronounced [ˈsitovo]) may refer to the following Bulgarian villages:

- Sitovo, Plovdiv Province
- Sitovo, Silistra Province, the administrative centre of Sitovo municipality
- Sitovo, Yambol Province
- Sitovo - in Poland
