= Dedovo =

Dedevo
- Village
- Location within Bulgaria
- Coordinates: 41°59′38″N 24°39′26″E
- Country: Bulgaria
- Time zone: UTC+1 (EET)
  - Summer (DST): UTC+2 (EEST)

Dedevo (Bulgarian: Дедово) is a village in the Rodopi Municipality of Bulgaria. It is located roughly 26 kilometers from Plovdiv, and because of its high altitude of around 1500 meters it offers cool temperatures to many people who own holiday homes there during the summer to escape the heat of the cities. The town comprises multiple cafés and shops.
