= Izvor, Plovdiv Province =

Izvor Извор
- Village
- Location within Bulgaria
- Coordinates: 41.966667°N 25.05°E
- Country: Bulgaria
- Province: Plovdiv Province
- Municipality: Rodopi Municipality

Area
  - Total: 17.38 km^{2} (6.71 sq mi)
- Elevation: 650 m (2,130 ft)
  - Density: 3.22/km^{2} (8.3/sq mi)
- Postal code: 4116
- Area code: 03120

Izvor is a village in Southern Bulgaria in Rodopi Municipality, Plovdiv Province. The total population count of the village as per June 2020's national census was 56 people.

== Geography ==
Izvor is one of the more touristically-attractive villages in Rodopi Municipality. It is located 17 kilometers South from the town at 550 meters elevation above sea level in Rhodope Mountains. There are 12 chapels in the village and one church "Sveti Iliya". Another popular tourist attraction in the village are the two well-preserved Roman Empire bridges.

The total area of the village is over 20,000 hectares. The majority of which are forests. There are interesting sediments and geomorphological formations. The largest such rock in the region can be found near the river Izvorska.

The church was built in 1925. According to local villagers and media the village is a common spot for treasure seekers to survey.

== Ethnicity ==
=== According to the 2011 census ===
	Number	Percentage (in %)
Total	101	100.00
Bulgarians	95	94.05
Turks	0	0.00
Romani	0	0.00
Others	0	0.00
N/A	0	0.00
Unanswered	4	3.96

=== Population Count of Izvor during the years ===
Year of Census	Population Count
1934	1412
1946	1227
1956	757
1965	316
1975	187
1985	90
1992	105
2001	105
2011	101
2020	56
