= Sitovo inscription =

Ancient rock writing in Bulgaria

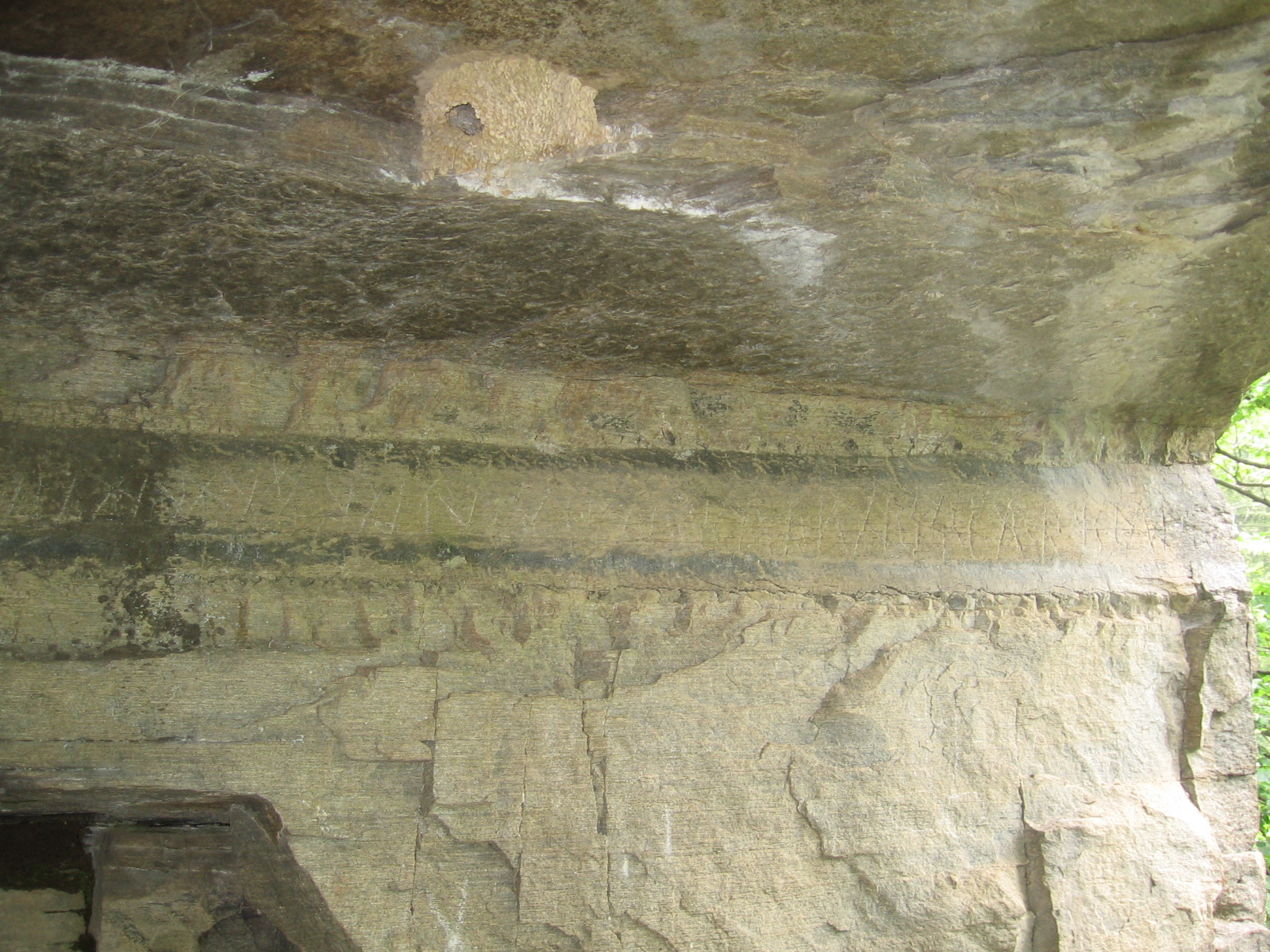
Sitovo inscription

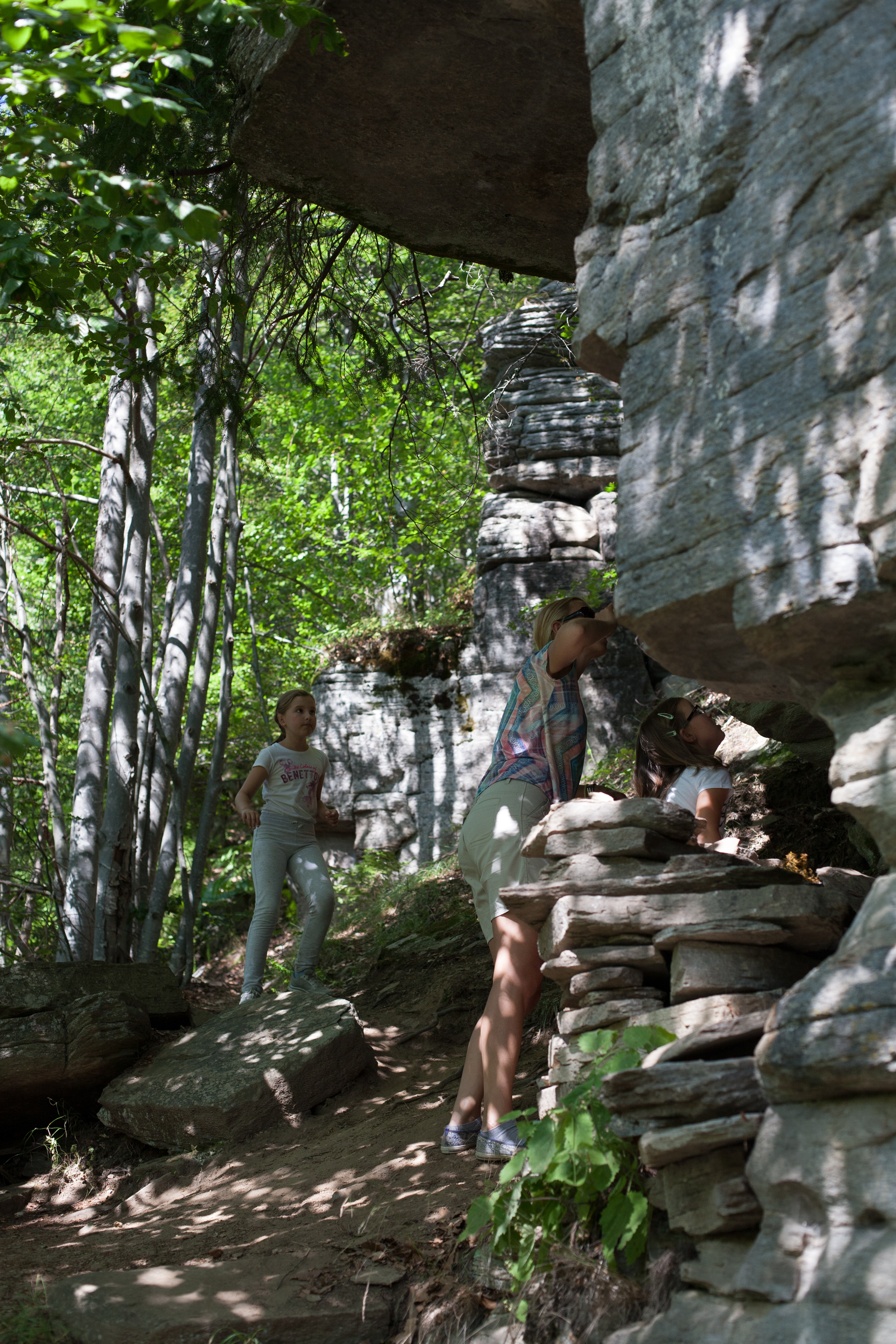
Rock with Sitovo inscription

The Sitovo inscription is an inscription in Bulgaria that has yet to be satisfactorily translated.

== Discovery ==
The inscription was discovered in 1928, on the wall of a rock shelter near the village of Sitovo, close to Plovdiv, Bulgaria. It was first documented by amateur archaeologist Alexander Peev. The inscription is in two lines which are 3.40 metres (11.2 ft) long. The written signs are 40 centimetres (16 in) tall. The inscription has been tentatively dated to between 300 and 100 BCE.

In 1943, Peev was executed by firing squad on suspicion of sending a coded message to the Soviet Union. He had sent an example of the text to Soviet archaeologists, in the hope that they could decipher its meaning. The inscription was published in 1950 by Z. R. Morfova. Peev was posthumously awarded the Order of Lenin for his resistance efforts against the Bulgarian government.

== Possible translations ==
Amateurs and professionals have attempted to translate the inscription. It has been variously identified as local ancient language, Celtic, Slavic, and Phrygian.

== See also ==
- Vinča symbols
