= Kadievo =

Kadievo Кадиево
- Village
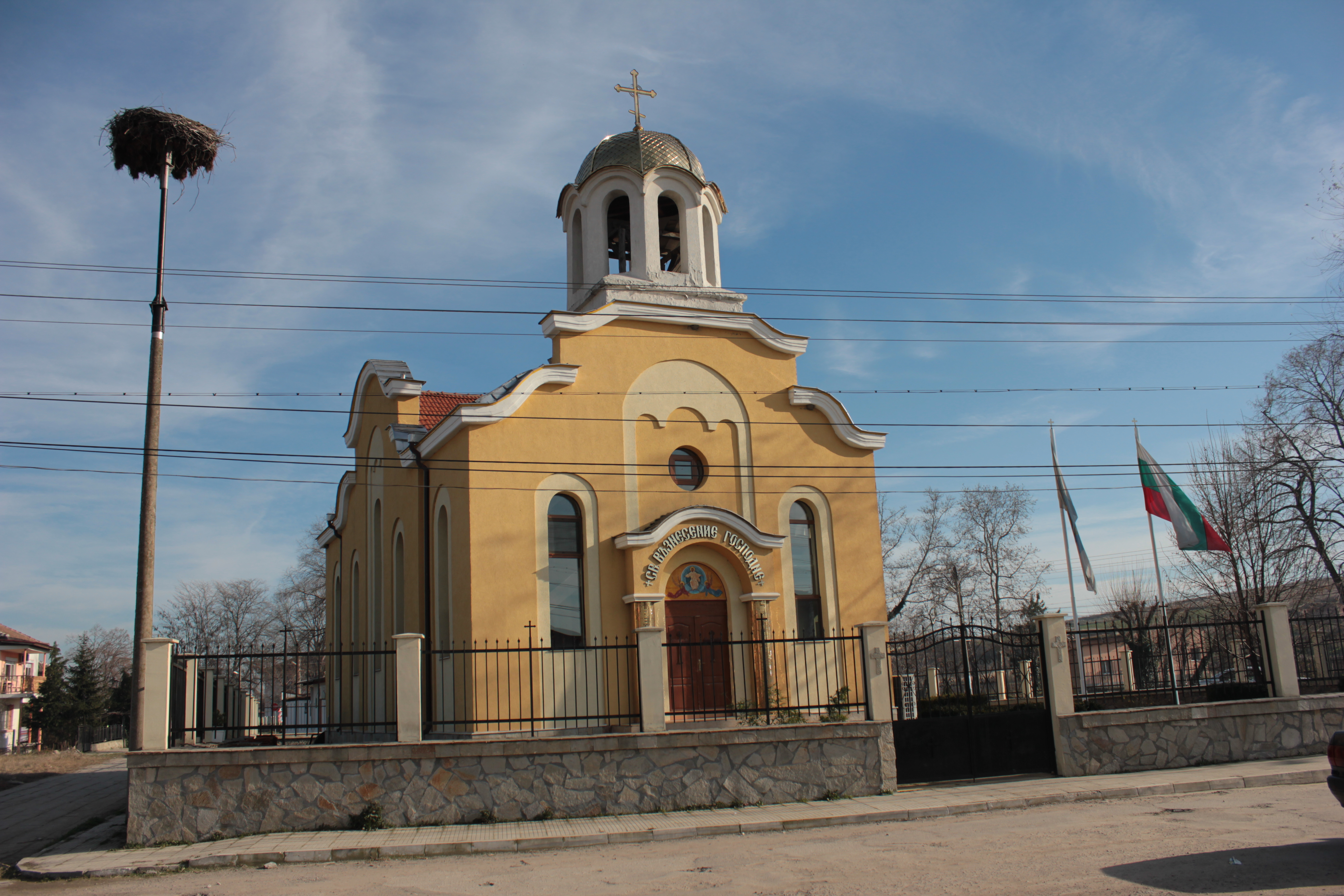
- The Church in Kadievo

- Location within Bulgaria
- Coordinates: 42.133333°N 24.6°E
- Country: Bulgaria
- Province: Plovdiv Province
- Municipality: Rodopi Municipality

Area
  - Land: 5.002 km^{2} (1.931 sq mi)

Population
  - Total: 1,057
  - Density: 211/km^{2} (550/sq mi)
- Postal code: 4213
- Area code: 031401

Kadievo (Bulgarian: Кадиево) is a village in Southern Bulgaria, located in Rodopi Municipality, Plovdiv Province. As of 2020 the village has a population of 1057 people.

== Geography ==
Kadievo is close to the second largest river, streaming from the Rodope Mountain, Vacha river. The river is known for its clear waters as it does not pass near any productive facilities. The village is located 6 kilometers away from Plovdiv. The railway line from Plovdiv to Sofia passes through the village.

=== Infrastructure ===
The village has a school and a medical facility cabinet has been opened in 2021 in the school, that the local people can attend. There are children 58 active students in the school as of 2021.

There is a vineyard and a wine production facility near the area of the village, on the road to Plovdiv, where some of the people work. The wine cellars are often visited by tourists during the Summer months.

=== Ethnic division ===
As of 2011, the ethnic composition in the village was as follows:

	Number	Percentage( %)
Total	1107	100.00
Bulgarian	274	24.75
Turkish	0	0
Romani	0	0.00
Others	0	0
N/A	0	0
Unanswered	828	74.79

== Gallery ==
Cityline and images of Kadievo Village
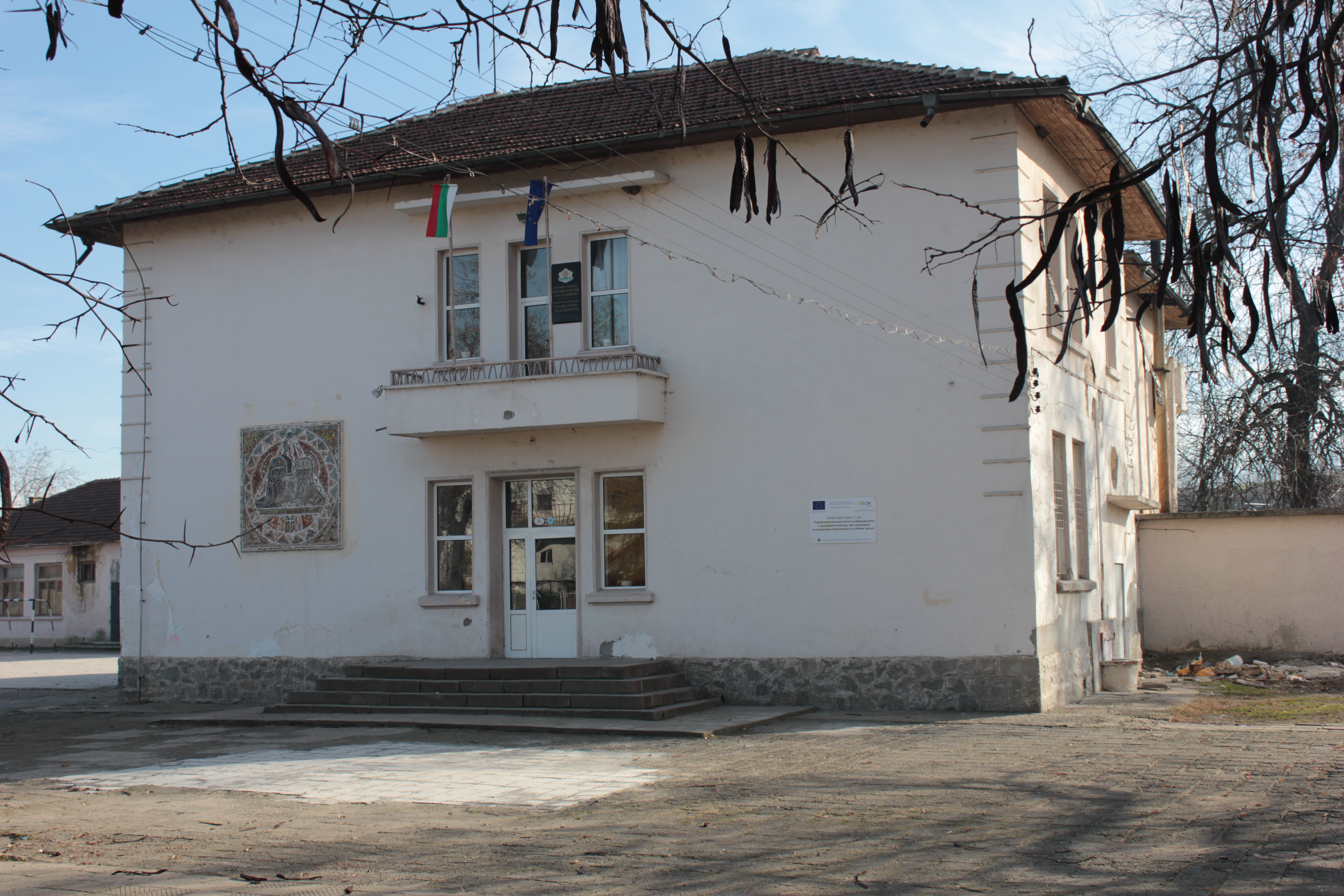
The School in Kadievo

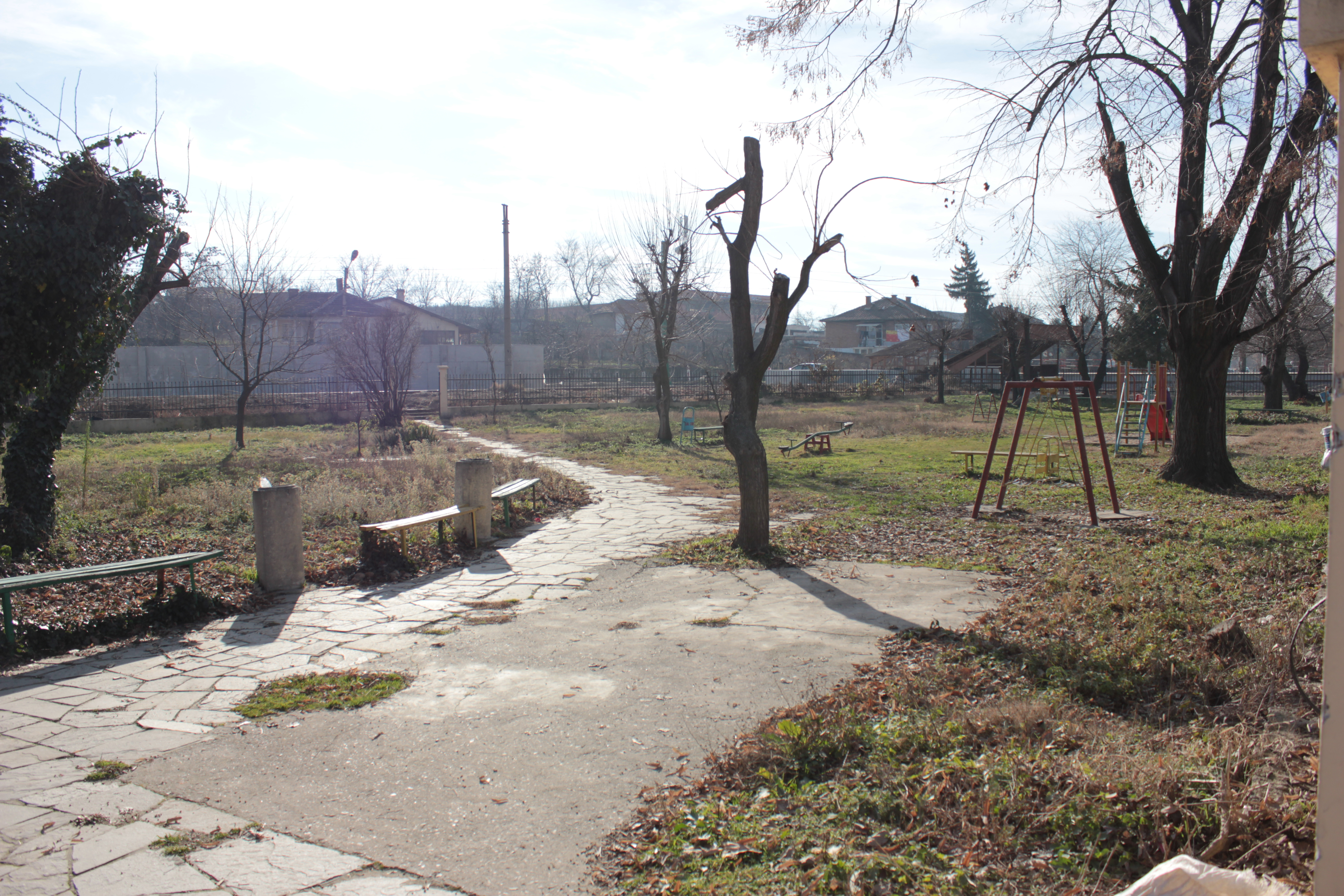
The Park in Kadievo

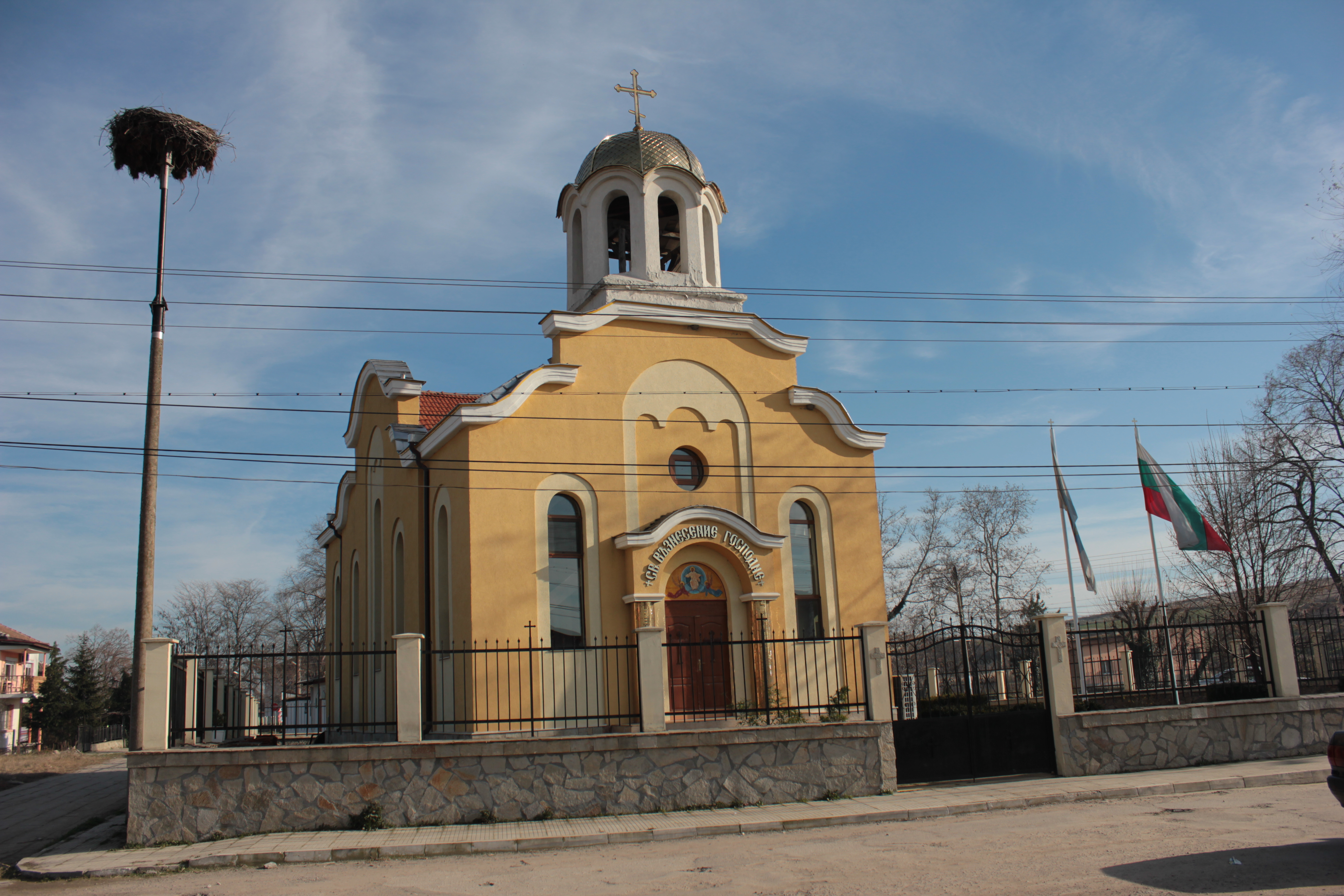
The church in Kadievo

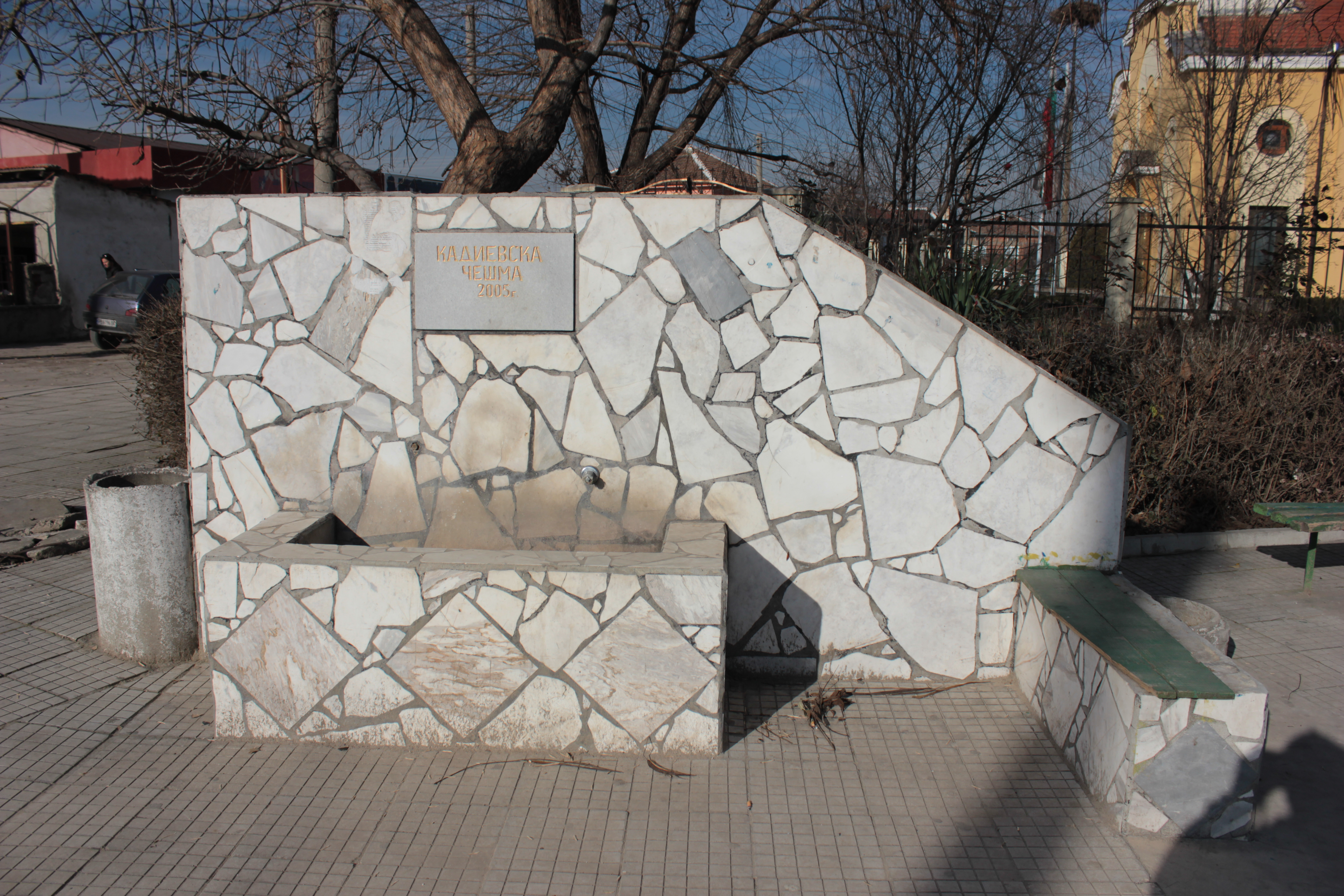
The fountain in Kadievo
