= Hrabrino =

Hrabrino Храбрино
- Village
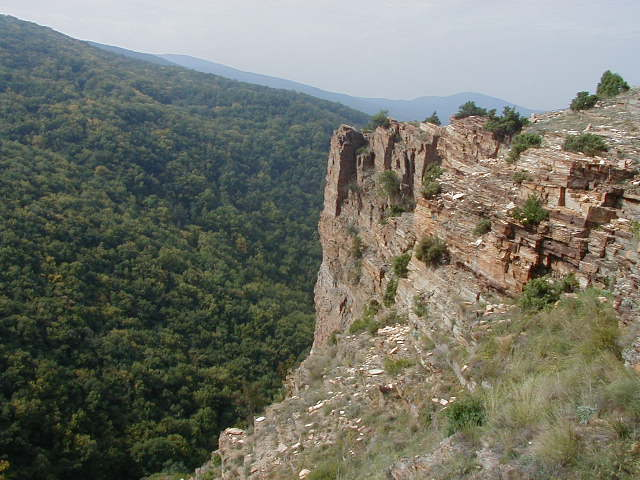

- Location of Hrabrino
- Coordinates: 42°02′N 24°38′E
- Country: Bulgaria
- Provinces (Oblast): Plovdiv Province

Government
  - Mayor: Angel Chobanov (GERB)

Area
  - Total: 13.881 km^{2} (5.359 sq mi)
- Elevation: 580 m (1,900 ft)

Population (2011-02-01)
  - Total: 661
  - Density: 47.6/km^{2} (123/sq mi)
- Time zone: UTC+2 (EET)
  - Summer (DST): UTC+3 (EEST)
- Postal Code: 4111

Hrabrino (Bulgarian: Храбрино) is a village in the Rodopi Municipality, Plovdiv Province in southern Bulgaria. According to a 2011 census, the village has a population of 661 people.

== Geography ==
The village is situated in the Rhodope Mountains at 15 km to the south-west of Bulgaria's second largest city, Plovdiv. There are two large and expanding villa zones in the mountainous part of the village. There are two rivers flowing through the village, the main one being Parvenetska reka. Hrabrino is a starting point of tourist tracks leading to several refuges in the mountain.

== History ==
Until 1934 the village was known as Sveti Spas and until 1960 its name was Sotir.

== Landmarks ==
There are a church and four chapels in Hrabrino. The Chapel of St Dimitar is situated in the highest point of the village near the monument to the partisans of the Rhodope region. At 5 km from the center at the direction to Brestovitsa is located the Chapel of St Spas after which the village was named until 1960.

There are also two bridges dating from the Roman rule.

== Gallery ==
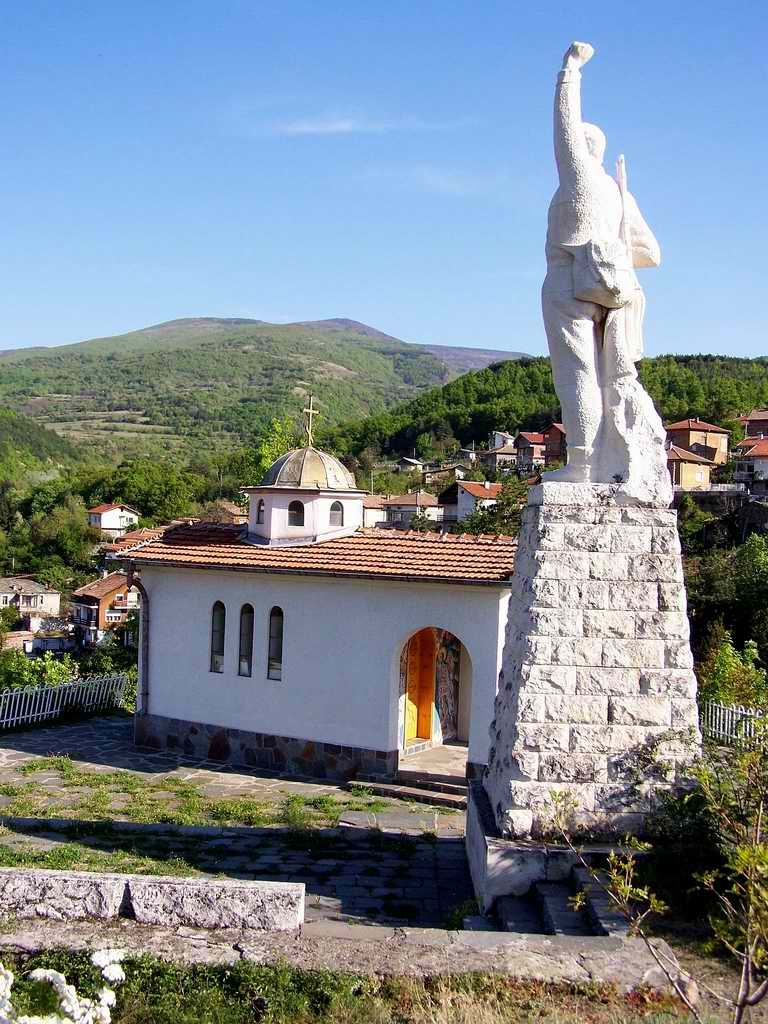
The chapel of St Dimitar and the monument on the hill.

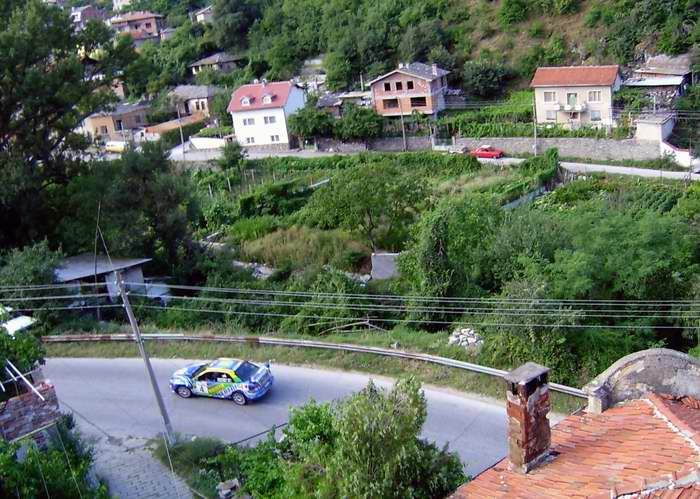

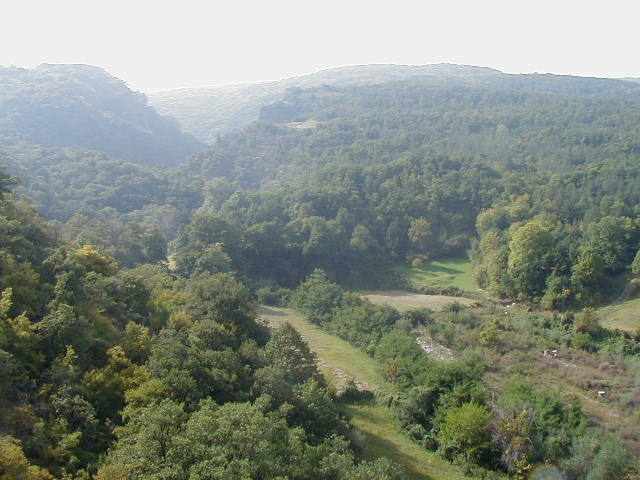
One of the numerous beautiful places around Hrabrino.

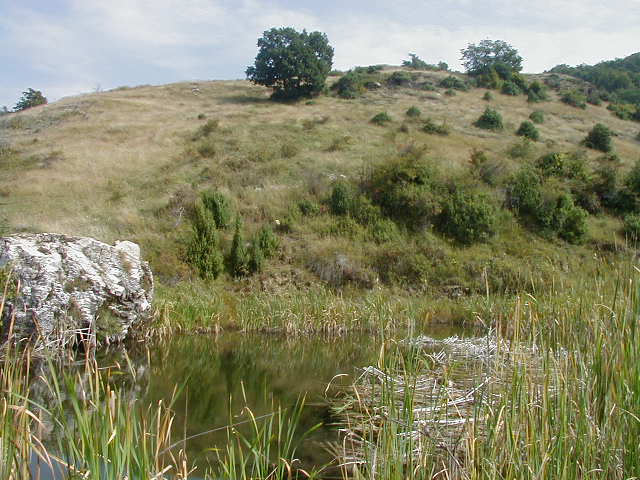

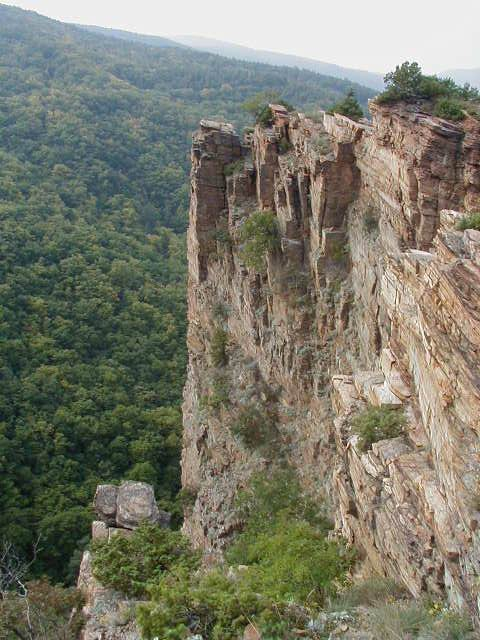
The Maiden's cliff /Momina skala in Bulgarian/ above the river, about 2 km away from Hrabrino, on the track to Hut Zdravets.
