= Rodopi Municipality =

Municipality in Plovdiv Province, Bulgaria

Coordinates: 41°57′25″N 24°34′23″E

Rodopi municipality (Bulgarian: Община Родопи) is situated in the Plovdiv Province, southern Bulgaria. As of 2006 the population is 33,111.

It occupies parts of the Upper Thracian Plain to the south of Plovdiv and the northernmost slopes of the central Rhodopi mountains. Its territory is 524.8 square kilometres (202.6 sq mi).

The backbone of the economy is agriculture which employs around 80% of the population. Amongst the most important crops are grapes with annual production of 15,000 tonnes.

== Demography ==
=== Religion ===
According to the latest Bulgarian census of 2011, the religious composition, among those who answered the optional question on religious identification, was the following:

Religious composition of Rodopi Municipality
Orthodox Christianity	88.3%
Catholicism	1.0%
Protestantism	0.7%
Islam	3.6%
No religion	1.1%
Prefer not to answer, others and indefinable	5.3%

Most inhabitants are ethic Bulgarians who belong to the Bulgarian Orthodox Church. The Turkish minority lives mainly in two villages: Branipole and Ustine. Most Turks are also Muslim by religion.

== Villages in the Rodopi municipality ==
- Belashtitsa
- Boykovo
- Branipole
- Brestnik
- Brestovitsa
- Churen
- Dedovo
- Hrabrino
- Izvor
- Kadievo
- Krumovo
- Lilkovo
- Markovo
- Orizari
- Parvenets
- Sitovo
- Skobelevo
- Tsalapitsa
- Ustina
- Yagodovo
- Zlatitrap
