= Lilkovo =

- Лилково
- Coordinates: 41°54′39″N 24°35′13″E
- Country: Bulgaria
- Province: Plovdiv
- Municipality: Rodopi

Area
  - Land: 62.4 km^{2} (24.1 sq mi)
- Elevation: 1,400 m (4,600 ft)

Population (2020)
  - Total: 21
- Postal code: 4105
- Area code: 03109

Lilkovo is a mountain village in southern Bulgaria. It is one of the highest settlements in Bulgaria. It is also one of the largest villages by land area in the Rhodope Mountains.

== Geography ==
Lilkovo is located in the central part of the Rhodope Mountains. It is part of the Rodopi Municipality in the Plovdiv Province, and it is situated approximately 36 km southwest from Plovdiv. Lilkovo is among the highest villages in Bulgaria. The elevation at the main square (Bordtse) is 1400 m, but the village extends to an altitude of more than 1450 m. The highest point within the territory of Lilkovo is Mount Modar with an elevation of 1992 m. Near Modar rises Lilkovska river (also called Elshitsa), which flows by the village and later joins Sitovska and Tamrashka river. Nearby villages are Brezovitsa (distance: 2.5 km) and Sitovo (distance: 9.7 km). Not far away from Lilkovo was also the former village of Tamrash (also called Tomrash), which used to be a large administrative centre in the region before the Liberation of Bulgaria.

=== Climate ===
Lilkovo has a temperate mountain climate. The average temperature in January is between −7 °C and −1.5 °C, and the average temperature in July is between 11 °C and 20 °C. The average humidity level is 80% in January and 60% in July. There is a relatively high level of precipitations throughout the year.

=== Flora and fauna ===
The territory of Lilkovo covers vast meadows and forests. The forests start from 1000 –1100 m and reach over 1900 m. The lowest regions include mostly beech and black pine forests. Single trees of birch and wild willow can also be spotted there. White pine and spruce grow higher, and the highest terrains are occupied by spruce and juniper. The fir tree also occupies an important place among the coniferous species. There are a lot of wild berries (e.g., strawberries, raspberries, and blueberries), rose hips and wild plums.

The most typical wild animals found on the territory of Lilkovo are the following:

Mammals: roe deer, fallow deer, wild boar, rabbit, hedgehog, wolf, brown bear, lynx, fox, badger, beaver, squirrel, and marten.

Birds: wild pigeon, nightingale, cuckoo, great spotted and black woodpecker, crow, golden eagle, dove, and heather cock.

Reptiles and amphibians: common European viper, horned viper, grass snake, slow-worm, green lizard, wall lizard, green toad, yellow-bellied toad, and tree frog.

== Population ==
After the village of Tamrash was burned down during the First Balkan War in 1912, its Pomak population left the region by freeing up lands that the people of Lilkovo could cultivate. This increase in resources lead to a significant demographic growth in Lilkovo in the first half of the 20th century with a population exceeding 1000 people in the 1940s. However, a steady decline in the population of the village can be observed since the middle of the 20th century:

Historical population
Year	Pop.	±%
1946	1,054	—
1956	925	−12.2%
1965	462	−50.1%
1975	161	−65.2%
1985	111	−31.1%
1995	90	−18.9%
2005	54	−40.0%
2015	27	−50.0%

As of 15 June 2020, there are only 21 people with a permanent address in Lilkovo. One of the possible events that triggered the process of depopulation in the mid 1940s was the collectivization in the agricultural sector, which left many people without lands and in a state of insecurity. During the industrialization in Bulgaria (1944–1989) many of them migrated to the cities in search of employment.

Despite the low number of permanent residents, the village comes to life during the summer months when the hundreds of homes—both old stone houses and modern summer homes—get filled with people looking to escape from the heat and to enjoy the beautiful mountain landscapes.

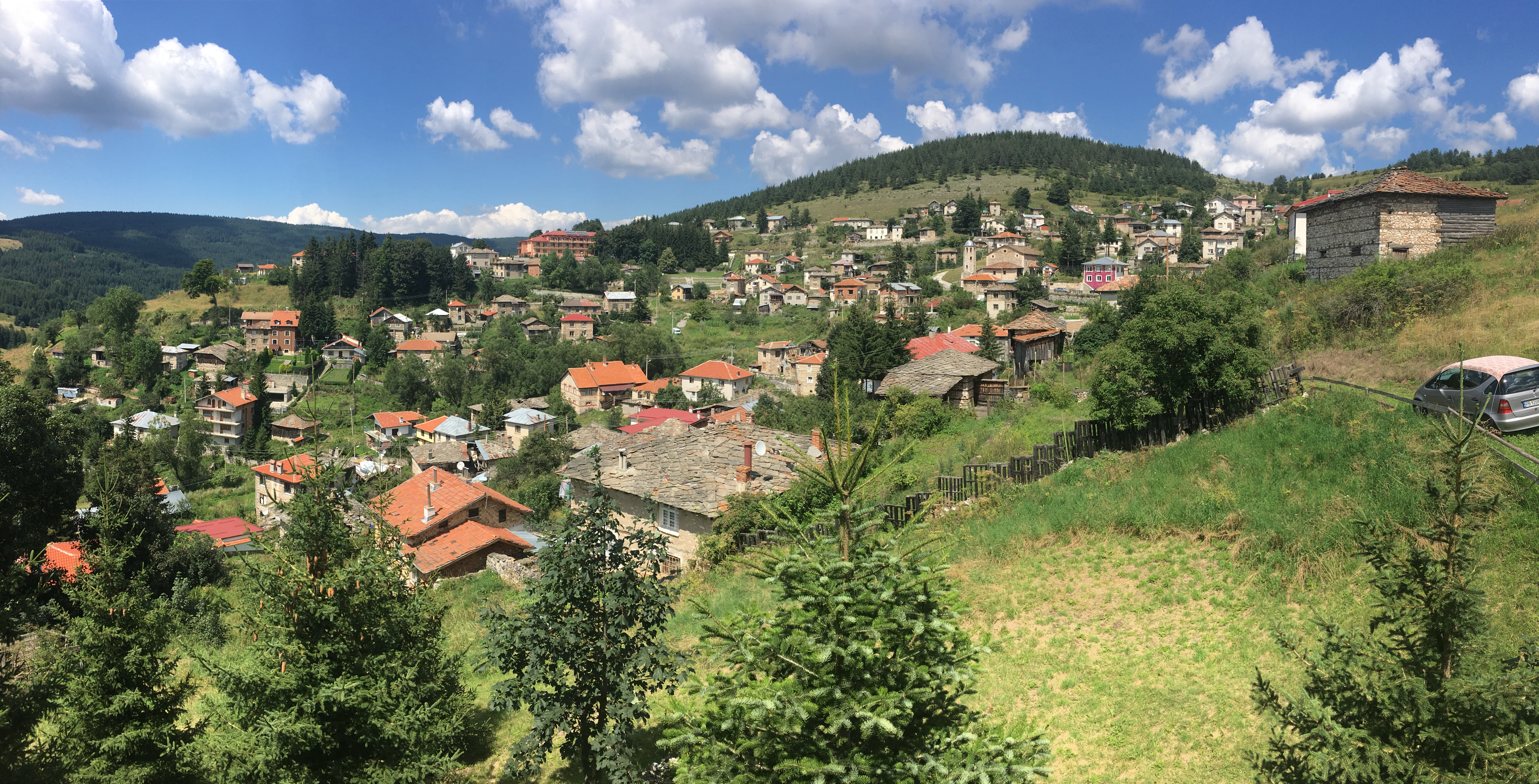
Panoramic view of Lilkovo

== History ==
Although it is known that Lilkovo has a long history, it is difficult to determine how old exactly the village is. The first written evidence of the existence of Lilkovo dates from 1083 when the Byzantine emperor Alexios I Komnenos issues a decree including a list of all villages bound to the Bachkovo Monastery. The name Lilkovo appears in that list. There is also evidence that a religious community named Lalku existed already in the same place at the beginning of the 1st century AD.

=== Origin of the name ===
There are several hypotheses about the origin of the name Lilkovo (Bulgarian: Лилково). According to the most plausible assumption, the name derives from the word lilek [лилек], which in the local dialect means "lilac" - a plant which grows in abundance in and around the village. This hypothesis is supported linguistically, as deletion of unstressed vowel sounds (e.g., /e/ in /'lilek/) is common for the regional language variety and can provide further evidence for the etymology of the word's stem (lilk-). The remaining suffix -ovo is common for Bulgarian villages.

Another hypothesis is that the name derives from lil [лил] - an obsolete word in the local dialect meaning "a thin, peeled wood of young pine or fir". Considering the coniferous vegetation in the region, this hypothesis may appear plausible, but it cannot explain the presence of the sound /k/ in the name.

There is also a legend, according to which the name of the first settler in the village was Lilo (diminutive: Lilko) and the village was named after its founder.

While Bulgaria was under Ottoman rule (14th - 19th century), the village was renamed to Demirciköy, which in Turkish means "iron village". After the Liberation of Bulgaria, Lilkovo regained its original name.

== Language ==
People born in Lilkovo speak a Rhodopean dialect of Bulgarian, which is similar to the one spoken in Smolyan. Due to the limited contact with other villages in the past, the dialect spoken in Lilkovo has preserved many of the characteristics of Old Bulgarian (also called Old Church Slavonic). Some of the most typical pronunciation features that are different from standard Bulgarian are: palatalization of consonants before a stressed [e], lack of the sound [ɤ] (usually replaced with [o]), and different stress assignment (often similar to Russian: сòрце [heart], мòре [sea], нèбо [sky], мàсло [butter]). There are also lexical differences, and many words in the local dialect are unintelligible in standard Bulgarian. A few examples are shown in the table below:

Examples of words from the local dialect
Lilkovo's dialect	Standard Bulgarian	English
алащисам	свиквам	to get used
гугугар	охлюв	snail
ежек	таралеж	hedgehog
есей	така	so; like that
жорда	(обла) греда	timber pole
кикотя са	смея се	to laugh
лопя	говоря (много)	to speak (too much)
мустав	изцапан	dirty
немò	недей	don't
укю	вуйчо	uncle
шайка	пирон	nail

== Education ==
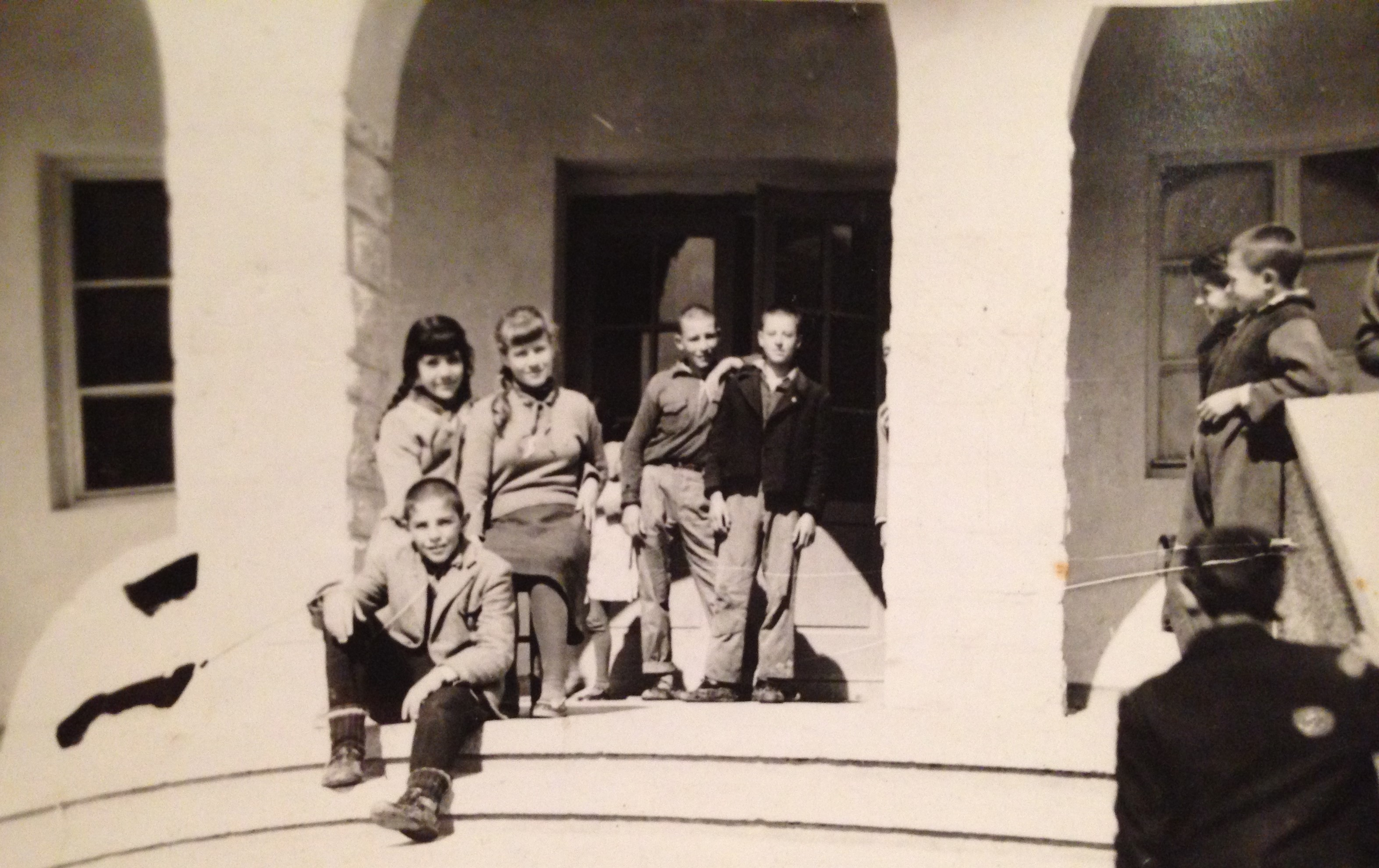
Students in the Hristo Botev School in the 1960s

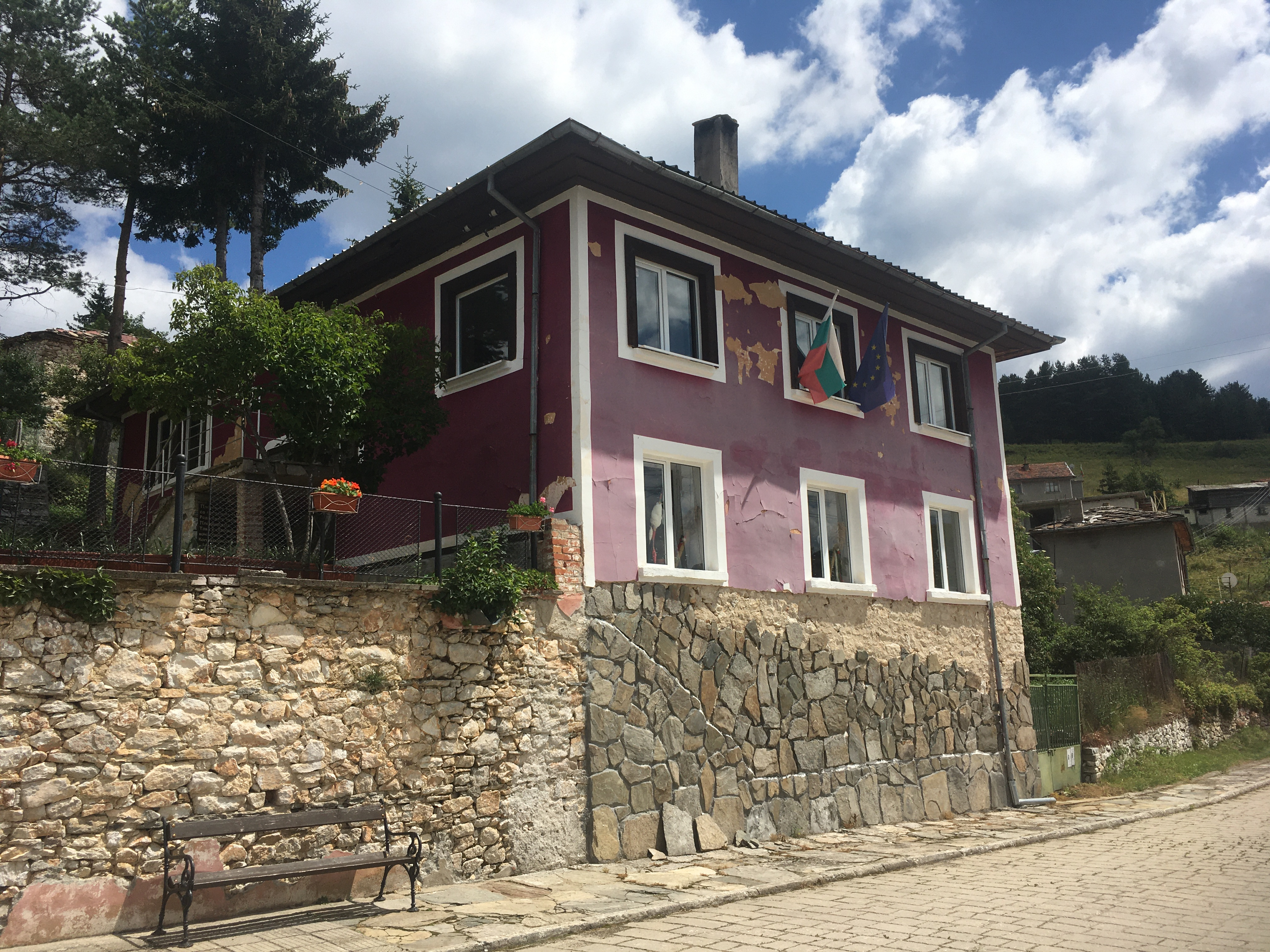
The first school building in Lilkovo (now the Village Hall).

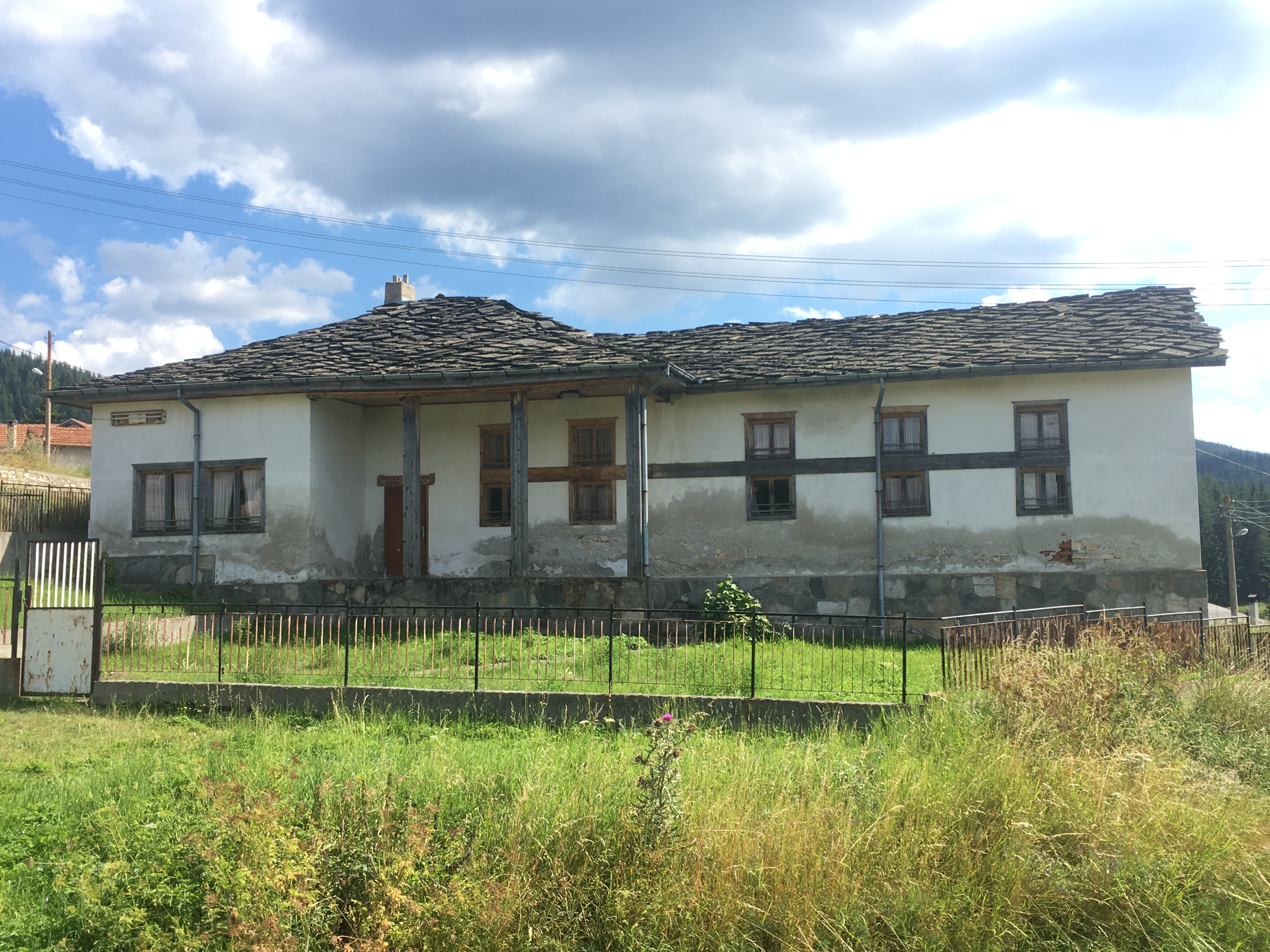
The Boris Koilov Chitalishte

A primary school existed in Lilkovo before the Liberation of Bulgaria. One of the first teachers was Georgi Stoyanov, who used for the first time the Fish Primer with students in the school in 1854. Students received education in Bulgarian and the school was attended by Christian students only. Girls did not attend school until the beginning of the 20th century when education became mandatory for all children. The Hristo Botev school had approximately 230 students in 1940. Initially teachers came mostly from other places but after 1944 there were more local teachers. The first school building located in the centre of Lilkovo was later transformed into a village hall. The school was then relocated to the building in front of the church. A large school was built in 1961 but it was closed in 1973 due to the lack of students. The building was later used for school camps, and most recently it was transformed into a modern hotel. Today, there is no school in Lilkovo due to the depopulation and the lack of children in the village.

The first chitalishte in Lilkovo began activity in 1905. Initially, it was called Rodopska Iskra ("Rhodopean spark") and it was located in the building of the old school. The chitalishte was a community centre where people gathered for different cultural and educational activities. It included a library with a relatively large collection of books many of which were destroyed during the socialist time. It also included a theater with a stage and approximately 250 seats. Different artists have entertained the local public in the village since 1905. The chitalishte attracted even more people as the Bulgarian National Radio began broadcasting in 1935 and the first radio receiver was brought to Lilkovo. Later, there were also movie screenings in the chitalishte. In 1950 the chitalishte was renamed after the partisan Boris Koilov. In 2002 the building of the old chitalishte burned down. The causes of the accident have not been completely clarified. A newer, renovated building had been in use since 1987, but all activities have ceased there and the building is now closed for the public.

== Religion ==
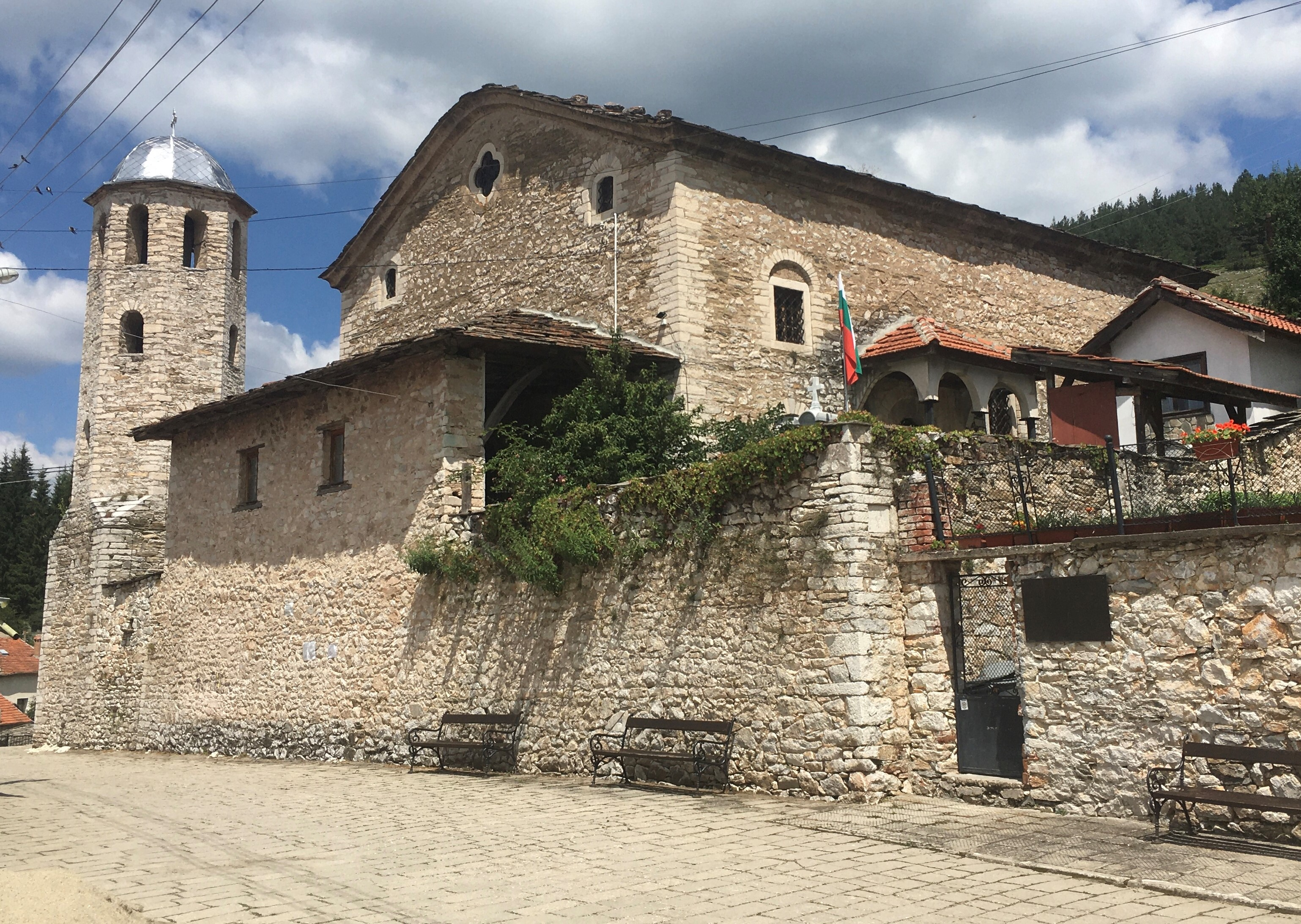
The Orthodox church St. Michael the Archangel in Lilkovo

The population of Lilkovo is Orthodox Christian. During the Ottoman rule, certain privileges (e.g., free fields, exemption from the devshirme tax) were offered to those people in the village who agreed to convert to Islam. Nevertheless, the majority of the population in Lilkovo remained Christian. At that time there were only 10–15 Pomak families who left the village after the Liberation of Bulgaria.

The church in Lilkovo was built before the Liberation of Bulgaria. The construction began in 1858 when according to the legend, the Ottoman governor Ahmed Agha came to Lilkovo and saw some Christian women lighting candles and placing ritual breads near the mosque. He asked why they were doing this, and the people in the village told him that there was once a Bulgarian church there and the Turks demolished it to build a mosque in its place. Then Ahmed Agha ordered a church to be built for the Bulgarians so that they would have a place where to pray. Although the church was finished in 1865, the bell-tower was built only after the Liberation of Bulgaria, as there was a limit of how tall a Bulgarian church could be during the Ottoman rule in Bulgaria.

Besides the church located in the centre of Lilkovo, there are also numerous smaller chapels scattered throughout the territory of the village.

== Economy ==
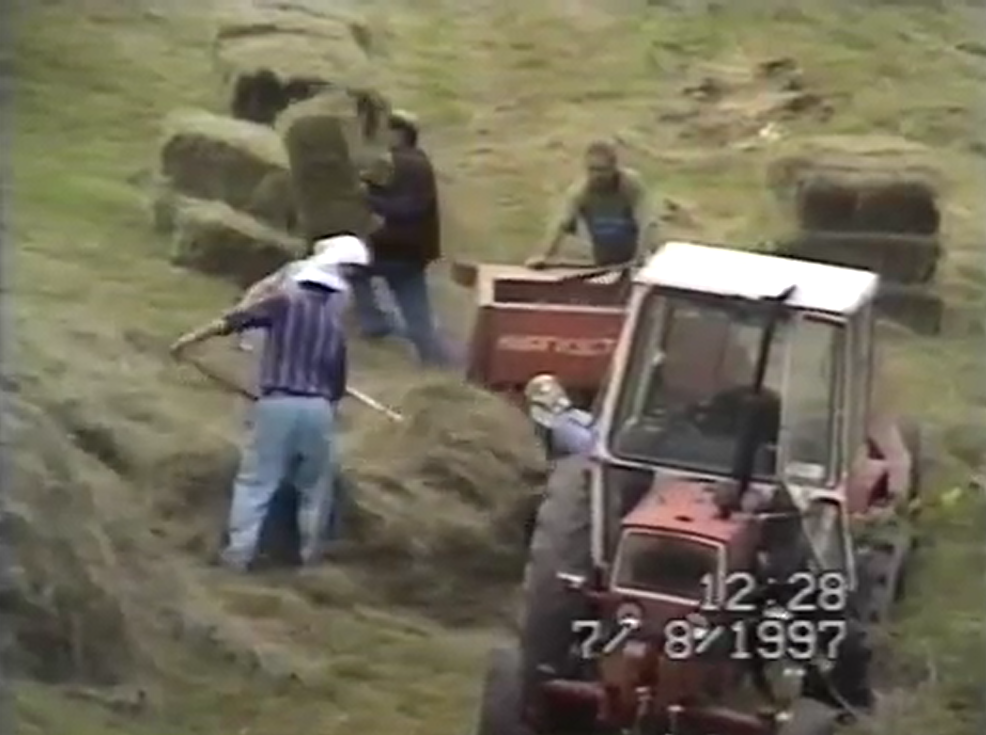
Farmers gathering hay in Lilkovo (1997)

Agriculture has been and continues to be one of the main livelihoods of the people in Lilkovo. The most important agricultural branch in Lilkovo after the Liberation of Bulgaria has been potato production. Although potatoes were already introduced to Bulgaria in the first half of the 19th century, people in Lilkovo began growing potatoes for the first time in 1878 when Russian soldiers brought the first potatoes to the village. Soon thereafter the villagers discovered that the lands of Lilkovo are very suitable for potato production and began planting different varieties of potatoes. At the beginning of the 1940s the village produced over 1200 tonnes of potatoes per year (i.e., more than 1200 kg of potatoes per capita).

Another traditional branch in the past was sheep-breeding. In the 1940s, there were 12,000–13,000 sheep in the village (i.e., over 10 times the number of people). Cattle-breeding and dairy production also used to be very popular. The timber industry has always been of secondary importance to farming. Because of the widespread stock-breeding in the village, forage production also developed as a traditional agricultural branch.
