= Brestovitsa, Plovdiv Province =

Brestovitsa Брестовица
- Village
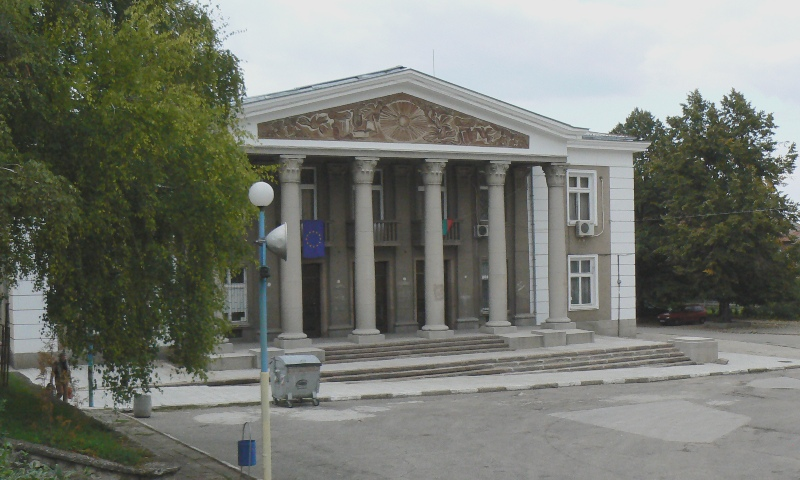

- Location of Oborishte
- Coordinates: 42°04′N 24°35′E
- Country: Bulgaria
- Provinces (Oblast): Plovdiv Province

Government
  - Mayor: Georgi Mitarchev (BSP)

Area
  - Total: 54.526 km^{2} (21.053 sq mi)
- Elevation: 297 m (974 ft)

Population (2007-01-01)
  - Total: 3,718
  - Density: 68.19/km^{2} (176.6/sq mi)
- Time zone: UTC+2 (EET)
  - Summer (DST): UTC+3 (EEST)
- Postal Code: 4224

Brestovitsa (Bulgarian: Брестовица) is a village in the Rodopi Municipality, southern Bulgaria. The village has a population of 3,718. The village is famous for its grape-growing and wines. There is a recreation villa zone mainly owned by citizens of Plovdiv.

== Geography ==
The village is situated at 18 km to the south-west of the municipal center Plovdiv. It is located on the northern foothills of the Rhodope Mountains on the geographic border with the Upper Thracian Plain at an altitude of 297 m.

The forests around the village cover an area of 2,500 ha. The relief is rugged with woods, meadows, ravines and rounded peaks. The village is characterized with transitional continental climate. The main soil types are cinnamon forests soil, the light brown forest soil and the mountain-meadow soil. The highest point in the village lands is at 930 m in the Bryanovshtitsa area.

The region has large biological variety. Most of the tree species common in the European temperate zone are presented. Forests occupy 2/3 of the village lands and 1/5 of them are artificially made – mainly pine and fir. The most common species among the deciduous trees are hornbeam, hazel, oak, beech, elm, lime tree, dogwood and crataegus and among the coniferous are several species of pine, fir and juniper. Around 5% of the forests are used for timber industry and the rest 95% have specific ecological purpose.

The fauna is also very rich and includes species such as hare, fox, wolf, wild boar, golden jackal, European badger, roe deer, deer, mouflon as well as many bird species including eagles and owls.

== History ==
The village exists since the 12th century. In the village lands have been discovered traces of a pre-historic settlement. Votive tablets with the Thracian horseman, silver coins and other objects have been discovered.

There are also the remains of the St Nicolas Monastery constructed during the cultural apogee of the Second Bulgarian Empire during the 14th century. The monastery was destroyed during forceful Islamization in 1666. Some of the monastery books are still preserved in the episcopal library in Plovdiv including two gospels from the 15th and 17th centuries. There is a theory that the St Nicolas Monastery used to be a literate center.

The village was mentioned for the first time in an Ottoman register from 1576 with the name Birestuviche.

== Religion ==
The Church of St Theodore of Tyron was constructed on the place of an older edifice which was destroyed during a flooding in 1848. The new church was inaugurated on 25 August 1851. It was large enough to accommodate the whole population of the village in that time. The icons were created by the painter Dimitar Zograf and his son Nikola Zograf from the town of Samokov.

== Education ==
The first school in the village was built for several months in 1835 although education had begun in 1800 in a small building with one room. The modern school named after the prominent Bulgarian poet and revolutionary Hristo Botev includes three buildings.

The chitalishte Saznanie (Consciousness) was built in 1873 by Bulgarian patriots. During its existence it became the cultural center of the village preserving its authentic traditions. The folk formations have interests in all aspects of the Bulgarian folklore. They perform and study traditional songs and dances from all over the country especially from Thrace. There are currently four ensembles in the chitalishte.

== Sports ==
The sports movement in Brestovitsa has its beginning in the 1920s when several gymnastics and football clubs were established. In 1982 a new sports hall with 250 seats was built and is used by the village school. Vanja Gesheva-Tsvetkova, the first Bulgarian with three medals in one Olympiad began her sports career in Brestovitsa.

== Gallery ==
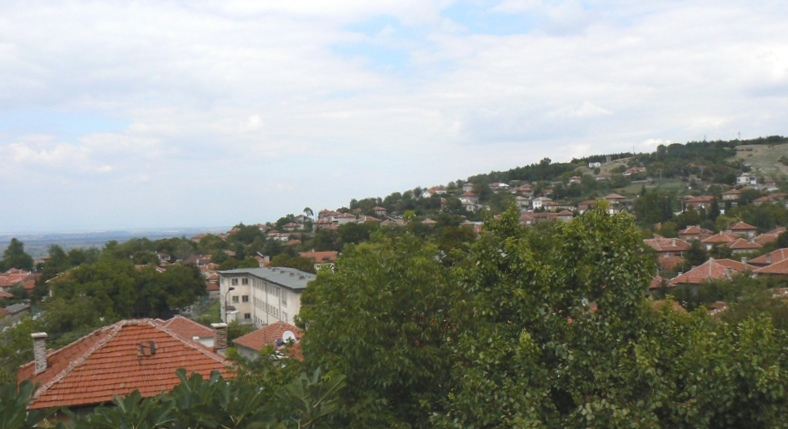
A view to the village

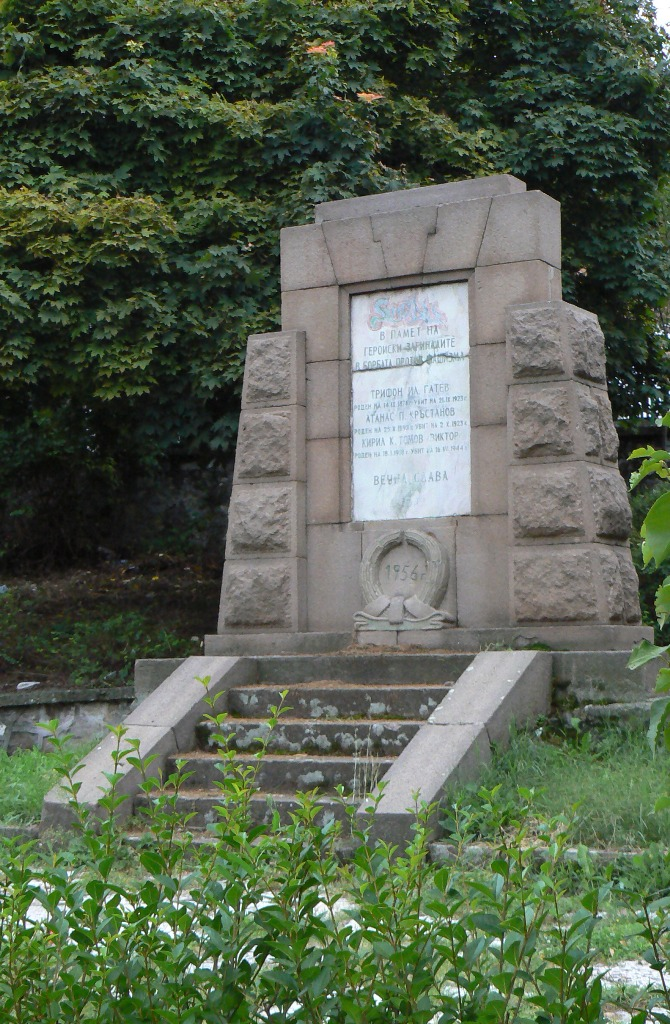
A monument to the fallen in the "resistance against fascism"

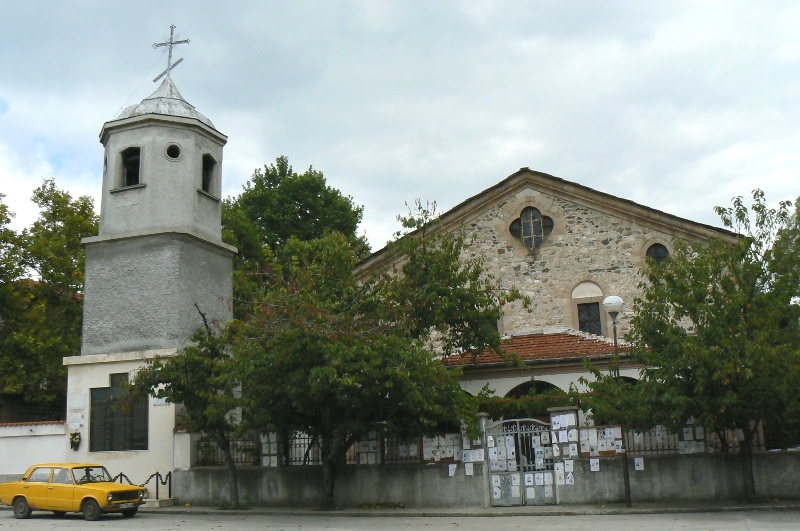
The Church of St Theodore of Tyron

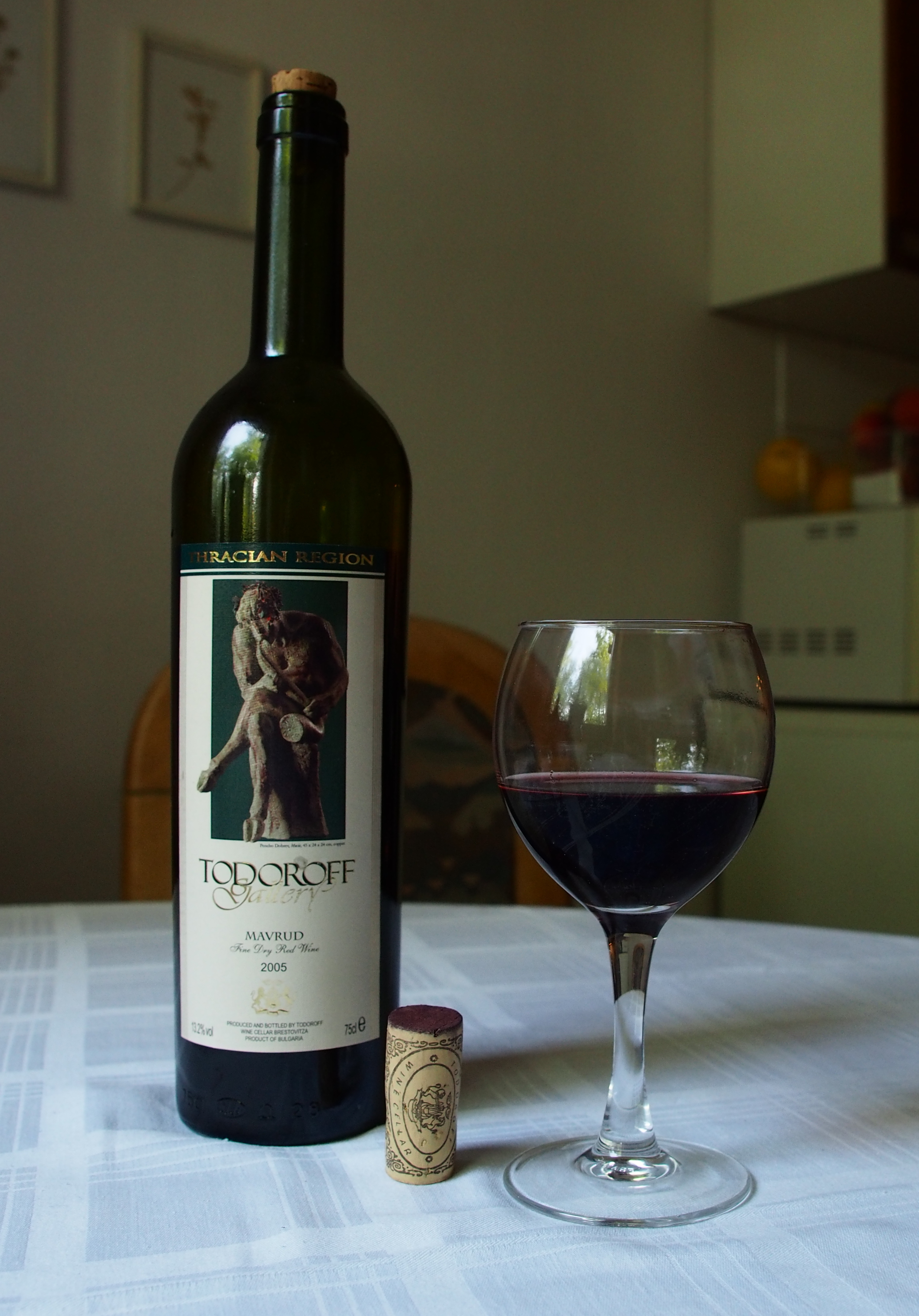
Mavrud red wine from Brestovitza wine cellar
