= Buciumi =

Buciumi may refer to several places in Romania:

- Buciumi, Bacău, a commune in Bacău County
- Buciumi, Sălaj, a commune in Sălaj County
- Buciumi, a village in Șomcuta Mare town, Maramureș County
- Buciumi (river), a tributary of the Cașin in Bacău County
