= Cașin (disambiguation) =

Cașin may refer to the following places in Romania:

- Cașin, a commune in Bacău County
- Cașin (Râul Negru), a tributary of the Râul Negru in Covasna County
- Cașin (Trotuș), a tributary of the Trotuș in Bacău County
- Mănăstirea Cașin, a commune in Bacău County, Romania
- Cașin Church, a Romanian Orthodox church located in Bucharest, Romania
