= Bucieș =

- Location within Romania

Location
- Country: Romania
- Counties: Bacău County

Physical characteristics
- Mouth: Cașin
  - coordinates: 46.0863°N 26.5815°E
- Length: 8 km (5.0 mi)
- Basin size: 29 km^{2} (11 sq mi)

Basin features
- Progression: Cașin→ Trotuș→ Siret→ Danube→ Black Sea

The Bucieș is a left tributary of the river Cașin in Romania. It flows into the Cașin near Scutaru. Its length is 8 km (5.0 mi) and its basin size is 29 km^{2} (11 sq mi).
