= Bucium (disambiguation) =

The Bucium is a Romanian musical instrument; the term may also refer to several places in Romania:

- Bucium, a neighbourhood in Iaşi, and one of the Seven hills of Iaşi
- Bucium, Alba, a commune in Alba County
- Bucium, a village in Șinca Commune, Brașov County
- Bucium, a village in Ceica Commune, Bihor County
- Bucium, a village in Orăștioara de Sus Commune, Hunedoara County
- Bucium, a village in Valea Ursului Commune, Neamţ County
- Buciumi (river), a tributary of the Cașin in Bacău County

== See also ==
- Buciumeni (disambiguation)
