= Cășăria River =

Cășăria River may refer to:

- Cășăria, a tributary of the Azuga in Prahova County, Romania
- Cășăria, a tributary of the Tărcuța in Neamț County, Romania

== See also ==
- Cășăria, a village in Neamț County, Romania
- Valea Cășăriei River (disambiguation)
- Cașin River (disambiguation)
