= Pârvulești =

Pârvulești may refer to:

- Pârvulești, a village in Mănăstirea Cașin Commune, Bacău County, Romania
- Pârvulești, a village in Stănești Commune, Gorj County, Romania
- Pârvulești, a village in Corcova Commune, Mehedinți County, Romania
