= Haloșul Mare =

- Location within Romania

Location
- Country: Romania
- Counties: Bacău County

Physical characteristics
- Mouth: Cașin
  - coordinates: 46.1548°N 26.7260°E
- Length: 8 km (5.0 mi)
- Basin size: 20 km^{2} (7.7 sq mi)

Basin features
- Progression: Cașin→ Trotuș→ Siret→ Danube→ Black Sea

The Haloșul Mare is a right tributary of the river Cașin in Romania. It flows into the Cașin near Mănăstirea Cașin. Its length is 8 km (5.0 mi) and its basin size is 20 km^{2} (7.7 sq mi).
