= Szárazpatak =

Botesbánya is the Hungarian name for two places in Romania:

- Ştefan cel Mare Commune, Bacău County
- Valea Seacă village, Râciu Commune, Mureș County
