= Curița =

- Location within Romania

Location
- Country: Romania
- Counties: Bacău County
- Villages: Curița

Physical characteristics
- Mouth: Cașin
  - coordinates: 46.1945°N 26.7447°E
- Length: 17 km (11 mi)
- Basin size: 31 km^{2} (12 sq mi)

Basin features
- Progression: Cașin→ Trotuș→ Siret→ Danube→ Black Sea

The Curița is a left tributary of the river Cașin in Romania. It discharges into the Cașin in the village Cașin. Its length is 17 km (11 mi) and its basin size is 31 km^{2} (12 sq mi).
