= Valea Cășăriei River =

Valea Cășăriei River may refer to:

- Valea Cășăriei, a right tributary of the Prahova in Sinaia, Prahova County
- Valea Cășăriei, a left tributary of the Prahova near Sinaia, Prahova County

== See also ==
- Cășăria River (disambiguation)
