= Antonio Andrușceac =

Romanian politician (born 1967)

Member of the Chamber of Deputies
- Incumbent
- Assumed office 21 December 2020
- Parliamentary group: Alliance for the Union of Romanians
- Constituency: Bacău

Personal details
- Born: 25 March 1967 (age 59) Gheorghe Gheorghiu-Dej, Bacău Region, Socialist Republic of Romania
- Citizenship: Romania
- Party: Alliance for the Union of Romanians (since 2020)
- Other political affiliations: Save Romania Union (until 2020)
- Education: University of Bucharest; The Open University
- Occupation: politician

Antonio Andrușceac (born 25 March 1967) is a Romanian politician. A member of the Alliance for the Union of Romanians (AUR), he was elected member of the Chamber of Deputies in the 2020 parliamentary election. Antonio Andrușceac was a founding member of the Save Romania Union and a party member until he was excluded in 2020 for his socially conservative stances. Since 2020, he has served as a quaestor of the chamber. In the 2024 European Parliament election, he was a candidate for member of the European Parliament. On 22 May 2025, he became a founding member of the Conservative Action party led by former AUR founder Claudiu Târziu.
