= Gheorghe Maftei (weightlifter) =

Romanian weightlifter

Personal information
- Nationality: Romanian
- Born: 1 April 1955 (age 71) Onești, Romania

Sport
- Sport: Weightlifting

Gheorghe Maftei (born 1 April 1955) is a Romanian weightlifter. He competed at the 1980 Summer Olympics, where he obtained 7th place, and the 1984 Summer Olympics. He also took part in the 1984 European Championships bantamweight class, coming 3rd.
