= Ștefan cel Mare, Bacău =

Ștefan cel Mare
- Commune
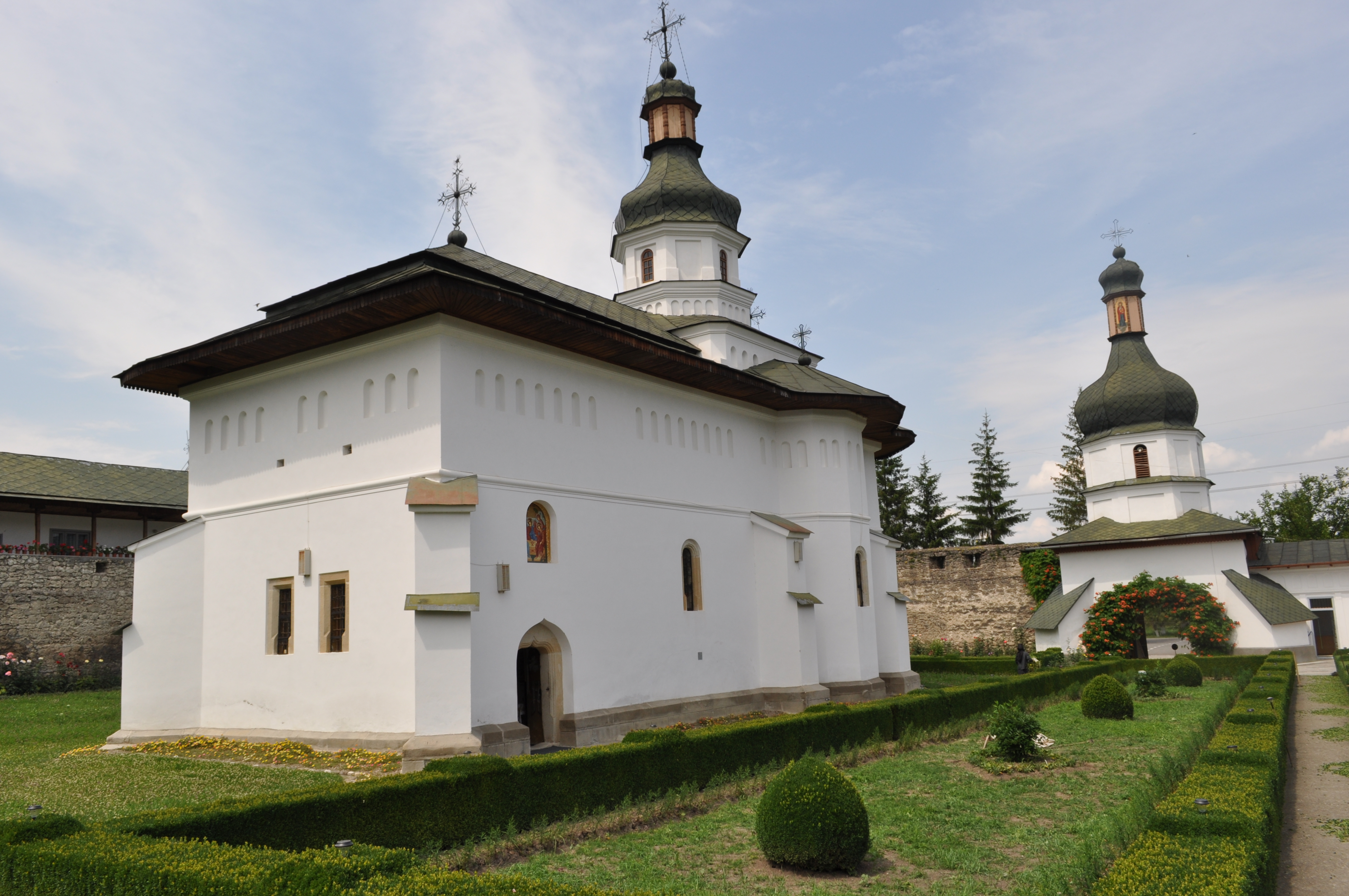
- Bogdana Monastery

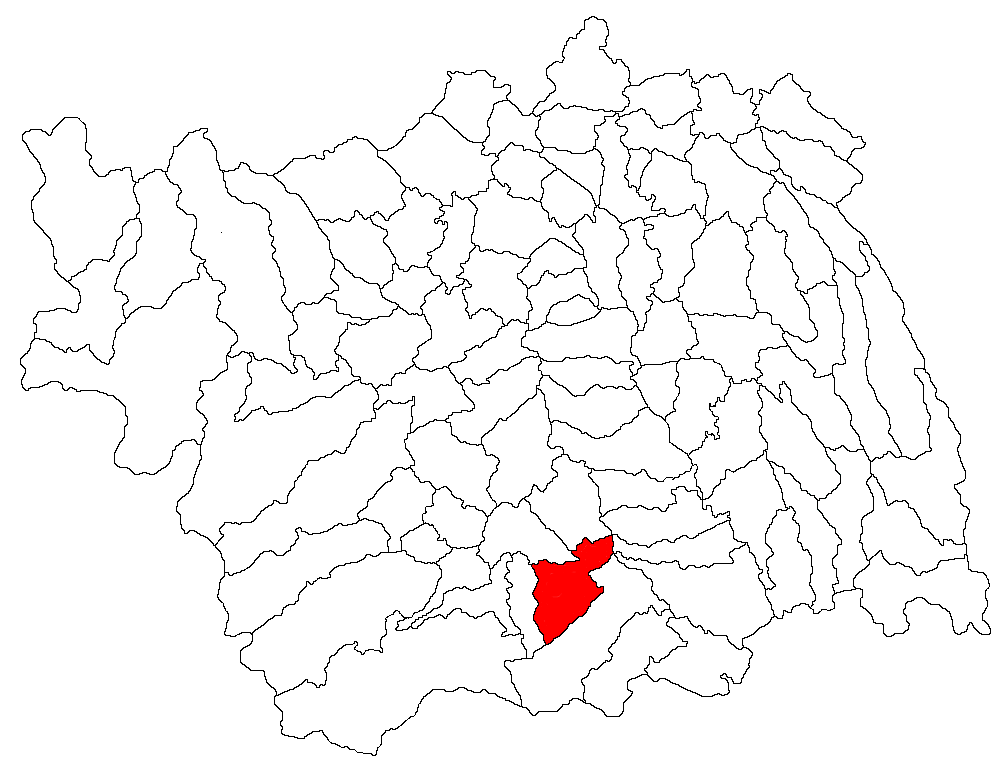
- Location in Bacău County

- Location in Romania
- Coordinates: 46°12′N 26°51′E
- Country: Romania
- County: Bacău

Government
  - Mayor (2024–2028): Ion Vlasie (PSD)
- Area: 71.34 km^{2} (27.54 sq mi)
- Elevation: 250 m (820 ft)
- Population (2021-12-01): 5,140
  - Density: 72.0/km^{2} (187/sq mi)
- Time zone: UTC+02:00 (EET)
  - Summer (DST): UTC+03:00 (EEST)
- Postal code: 607605
- Area code: +(40) 0234
- Vehicle reg.: BC
- Website: www.comunastefancelmare.ro

Ștefan cel Mare is a commune in Bacău County, Western Moldavia, Romania, named after Stephen the Great. It is composed of six villages: Bogdana, Gutinaș, Negoiești, Rădeana, Ștefan cel Mare, and Viișoara. It also included Buciumi and Răcăuți villages until 2005, when they were split off to form Buciumi Commune.

== Geography ==
Climate

The annual average temperature is 9.2°C. The climate is temperate continental, with warm summers and cool winters. The precipitation regime reaches its peak during the months of May and June, with an average of 516 mm. A characteristic of the local microclimate is persistent humidity throughout the year, which favors the phenomena of frost and fog. From a geotechnical perspective, the commune of Ștefan cel Mare is located in an area with a seismicity grade of 8.

Terrain

Geomorphologically, the commune of Ștefan cel Mare is situated at the boundary between the Moldavian Carpathians and the Curvature Subcarpathians, a relief with varied forms: from the existing floodplain on both sides of the Trotuș River to hilly ridges with maximum altitudes of 615–690 m. The terrace zone has its maximum extension on the right side of the Trotuș, where the vast majority of arable land is located. However, the predominant area of the commune’s territory, mostly covered by forests, pastures, and hayfields, is the hilly zone.

The commune is located within the Trotuș River hydrographic basin, downstream of its confluence with the Tazlău and Cașin rivers. The Trotuș flows in a NW-SE direction along a riverbed that reaches and exceeds approximately 100 m in width, featuring a fast current with gentle meanders where deposition, erosion, and flooding activities occur. Within the commune's territory, the Trotuș River receives the Bogdana, Rădeana, Gârbovana, and Drăgușana streams as right-bank tributaries, and the Matei, Chirila, and Pârâul Rece streams on the left side. These streams have low but permanent flows, with water level increases during rainy periods.

The groundwater table level varies depending on the relief, from 1–2 m in the floodplain to 26–30 m in the terrace zone. External drainage is poor in the floodplain, while on the slopes, it is excessive with low infiltration.

== Demography ==
According to the census conducted in 2021, the population of the Ștefan cel Mare commune amounted to 5,140 inhabitants, an increase compared to the previous census in 2011, when 4,742 inhabitants were registered. The majority of the residents were Romanians (68.58%), with a minority of Roma (24.81%), while for 6.6%, the ethnic affiliation was unknown. From a confessional point of view, the majority of the inhabitants were Orthodox (63.68%), with minorities of Pentecostals (23.13%) and Roman Catholics (6.03%), while for 6.73%, the confessional affiliation was unknown.
