= Buciumi, Bacău =

Buciumi
- Commune
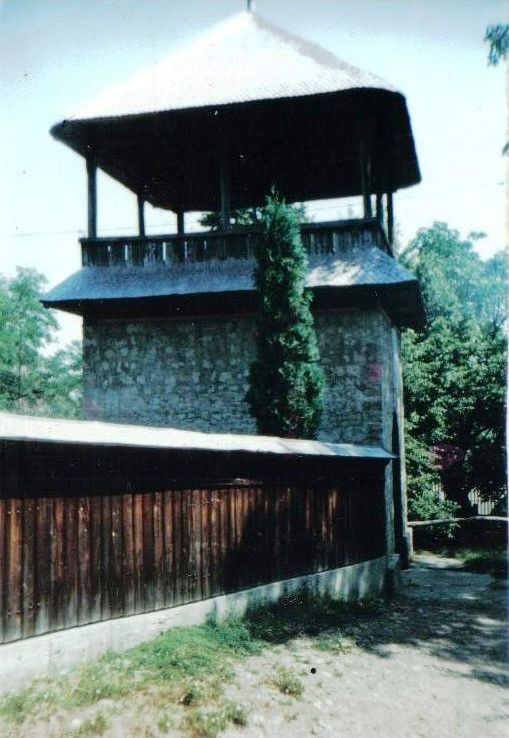
- Belfry of church in Buciumi

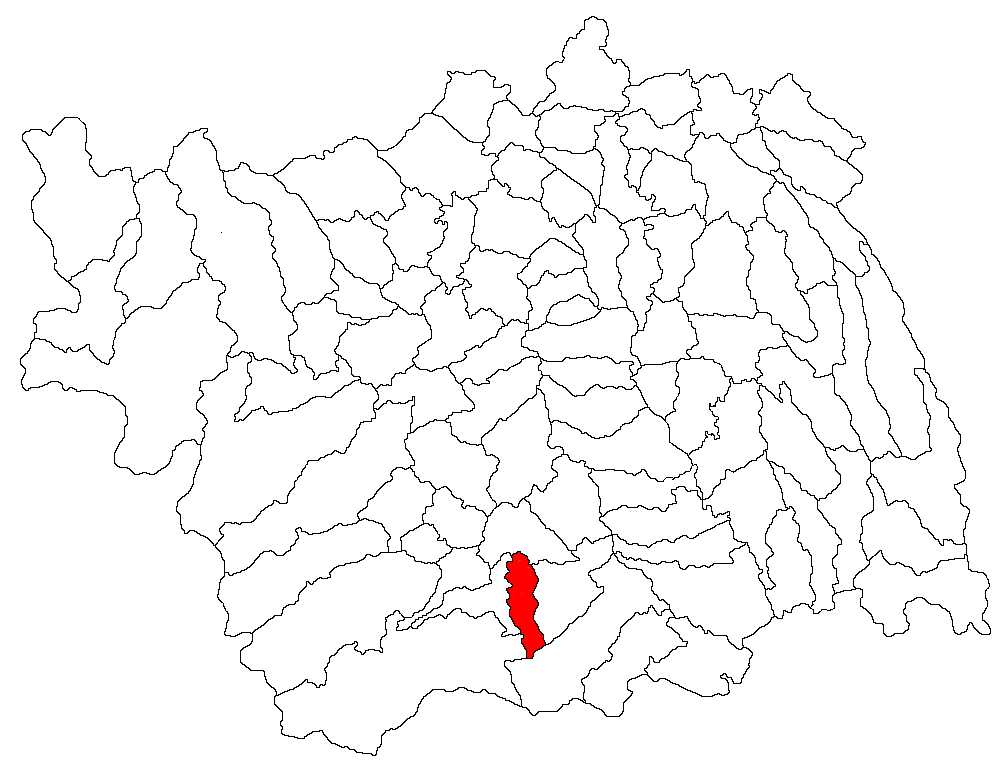
- Location in Bacău County

- Location in Romania
- Coordinates: 46°12′N 26°47′E
- Country: Romania
- County: Bacău

Government
  - Mayor (2020–2024): Fănică Cozma (PSD)
- Area: 28.97 km^{2} (11.19 sq mi)
- Elevation: 318 m (1,043 ft)
- Population (2021-12-01): 3,265
  - Density: 112.7/km^{2} (291.9/sq mi)
- Time zone: UTC+02:00 (EET)
  - Summer (DST): UTC+03:00 (EEST)
- Postal code: 607607
- Area code: +(40) 234
- Vehicle reg.: BC
- Website: primariabuciumi.ro

Buciumi is a commune in Bacău County, Western Moldavia, Romania. It is composed of two villages, Buciumi and Răcăuți. The villages were part of Ștefan cel Mare Commune until 2005, when they were split off.

== Geography ==
The commune is located in the southern part of the county, on the right bank of the Cașin River, near its confluence with the Trotuș River, south of the municipality of Onești, to which it is connected by local roads.

It is located at the geographic coordinates 46° 13' 29" N and 26° 47' 14" E. Climatically, Răcăuți lies in a transition zone between a warm-summer humid continental climate (Dfb) and a hot-summer humid continental climate (Dfa), according to the Köppen-Geiger climate classification. During the summer, temperatures can exceed 35 °C, reaching as high as 40 °C in extreme cases. In winter, temperatures frequently drop below -10 °C and -15 °C. On clear nights with thermal inversions, extreme lows can reach -25 °C.

== Răcăuți ==
Răcăuți village lies along the local road DC124, about 267 km from Bucharest and 50 km from Bacău, the county seat. The area has a long history, its existence indirectly confirmed by the archaeological site at “La Rupturi,” which shows that people have lived there since the Bronze Age (Monteoru culture).

=== Churches ===
The first church in Răcăuți was a wooden structure erected in 1785 through the efforts of the local parishioners. Due to structural decay, the place of worship was rebuilt using masonry between 1873 and 1881, while preserving the ship-like shape of the original building. The new church featured an open porch on the southern side and a bell tower on the western side. It was consecrated on March 29, 1881, by Archpriest Teodor Atanasiu. Following damage caused by earthquakes, the building underwent major repairs in 1896, when the structure was reinforced with iron braces. According to the 1936 Yearbook of the Diocese of Roman and Huși, the parish served 135 families (624 people) at that time, with Nicolae Ghioldum serving as the parish priest.

The current iconostasis dates back to the late 19th century and was repainted in 1882 by the painter Grama from Târgu Ocna.The old iconostasis from the former Horgăi Monastery (documented before 1453 and originally located at the "La Rupturi" site), was transferred to the center of the village after the monastery was decommissioned. The bell tower houses three bells: the oldest dates from 1781, the second was cast in 1931, and the third is a recent acquisition. The church also historically held a collection of rare books dating from the 18th and 19th centuries.

A mortuary chapel was started in 2017 and consecrated two years later. The village also hosts a Seventh-day Adventist community. Their house of prayer (church) is located at no. 358A and was built in 1994.

=== Archaeology ===
The archaeological site of Răcăuți, located at the "La Rupturi" point, is situated on a hill that provides a dominant position over the valley, ensuring visibility and protection against the floods of the Trotuș River. The site covers an area of approximately 15,000 square meters and is registered in the National Archaeological Record (RAN code: 20732.02). The site was first identified by Ecaterina Dunăreanu Vulpe. Subsequently, in the 1930s, research was conducted by C. Matasă, followed in 1961 by a surface survey led by I. Șandru. the site contains several habitation layers, confirming the use of the area across different eras:

- Bronze Age: Remains of a civil settlement belonging to the Monteoru culture (phase Ic3) have been identified. The ceramic material discovered is highly fragmented, yet its characteristics allow for a clear chronological classification.
- Medieval Period: Fragments of glazed ceramics from the late medieval period (18th century) have been unearthed, suggesting the existence of a short-term habitation or a seasonal settlement.

== Demography ==
At the 2011 census, the commune had 2,984 inhabitants, of which 75.6% were Romanians and 24.4% Roma. At the 2021 census, Buciumi had a population of 3,265; of those, 74.79% were Romanians and 21.5% Roma.

Ethnic composition of Buciumi Commune
1. Romanians (74.8%)
2. Roma (21.5%)
3. Other ethnic groups (0.03%)
4. Unknown (3.68%)
Religious composition of Buciumi Commune
1. Orthodox (88.4%)
2. Pentecostals (4.62%)
3. Roman Catholics (1.19%)
4. Adventists (1.13%)
5. Other religions (0.80%)
6. Unknown (3.83%)

Historical population
Year	Pop.	±%
2002	2,823	—
2011	2,984	+5.7%
2021	3,265	+9.4%
Source: Census data
