= Buciumeni =

Buciumeni may refer to:

- Buciumeni, Dâmbovița, a commune in Dâmboviţa County, Romania
- Buciumeni, Galați, a commune in Galați County, Romania
- Buciumeni, a village in Drăgoești, Vâlcea, Vâlcea County, Romania
- Buciumeni, a district in the town of Budești, Călăraşi County, Romania
- Buciumeni, a district in the town of Buftea, Ilfov County, Romania
- Buciumeni, a former district in the city of Fălticeni, Suceava County, Romania
- Buciumeni, Ungheni, a commune in Ungheni district, Moldova

== See also ==
- Bucium (disambiguation)
