= Gabriel Bruchental =

Romanian footballer (born 1965)

Personal information
- Full name: Gabriel Marius Bruchental
- Date of birth: 7 May 1965 (age 61)
- Place of birth: Onești, Romania
- Height: 1.85 m (6 ft 1 in)
- Position: Defender

Senior career*
Years	Team	Apps	(Gls)
1984–1995	Bihor Oradea	192	(5)
1995–1996	Viitorul Oradea		
Total		192	(5)
- * Club domestic league appearances and goals as of 09:01, 19 January 2025 (UTC)

Gabriel Marius Bruchental (also known as Gabriel Bruckental; born 7 May 1965) is a Romanian former professional footballer. Born in the town of Gheorghe Gheorghiu-Dej (now Onești), Bruchental started to play for FC Bihor Oradea on 12 May 1985, when he made its top-flight debut in a match between FC Bihor and FC Olt. Bruchental played for more than 10 years for the red and blues, in over 190 matches and scored 5 goals (79 matches and 0 goals in the Divizia A). In his last season as a player, Bruchental played for Viitorul Oradea, a club owned at that time by Marcel Pușcaș and coached by FC Bihor legend Robert Cosmoc.

On 1 April 2023, on the 65th anniversary of FC Bihor, Gabriel Bruchental was the special guest of the local derby between FC Bihor Oradea and Lotus Băile Felix.

== Honours ==
Bihor Oradea

- Divizia B: 1987–88
