= Buciumi (river) =

- Location within Romania

Location
- Country: Romania
- Counties: Bacău County
- Villages: Buciumi, Răcăuți

Physical characteristics
- Mouth: Cașin
  - coordinates: 46.2289°N 26.7714°E
- Length: 11 km (6.8 mi)
- Basin size: 18 km^{2} (6.9 sq mi)

Basin features
- Progression: Cașin→ Trotuș→ Siret→ Danube→ Black Sea

The Buciumi is a right tributary of the river Cașin in Romania. It flows into the Cașin near Răcăuți. Its length is 11 km (6.8 mi) and its basin size is 18 km^{2} (6.9 sq mi).
