= Onești =

City in Bacău County, Romania

- Municipality
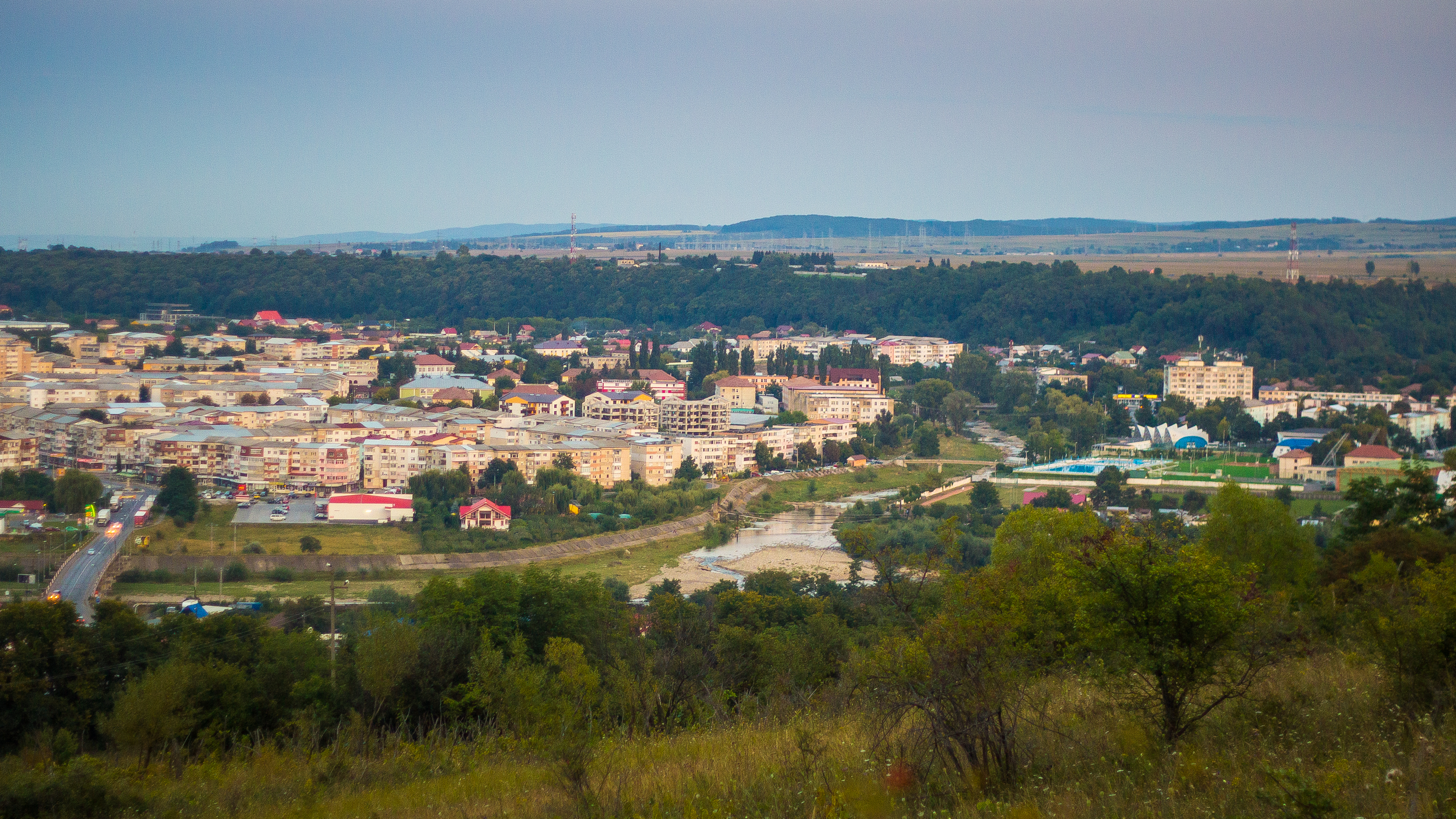
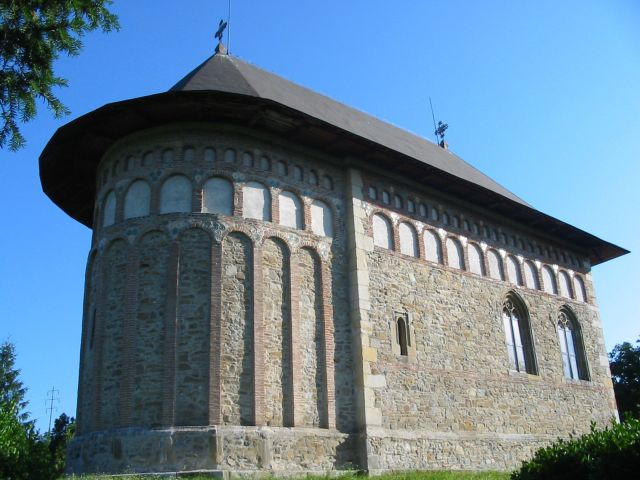
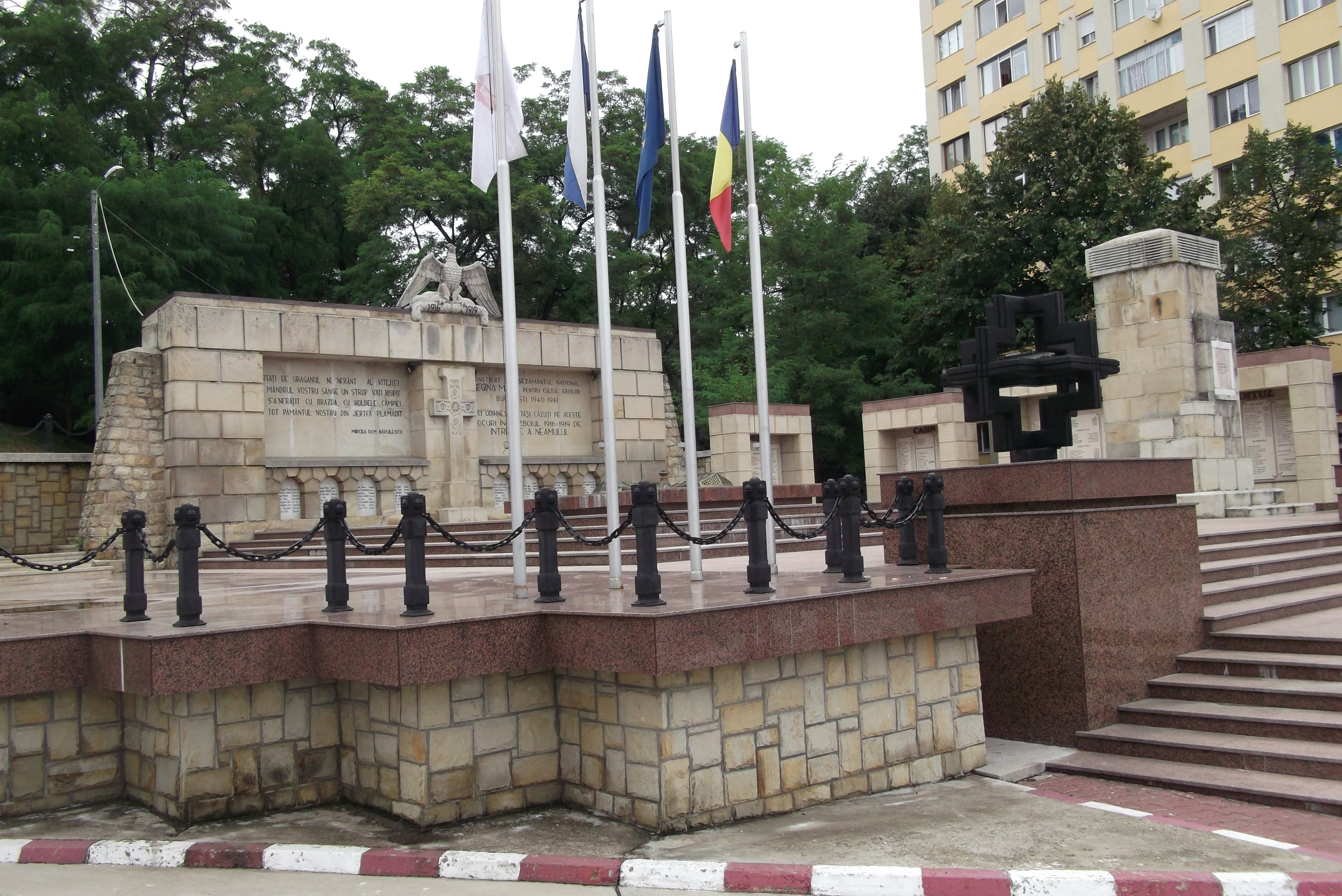
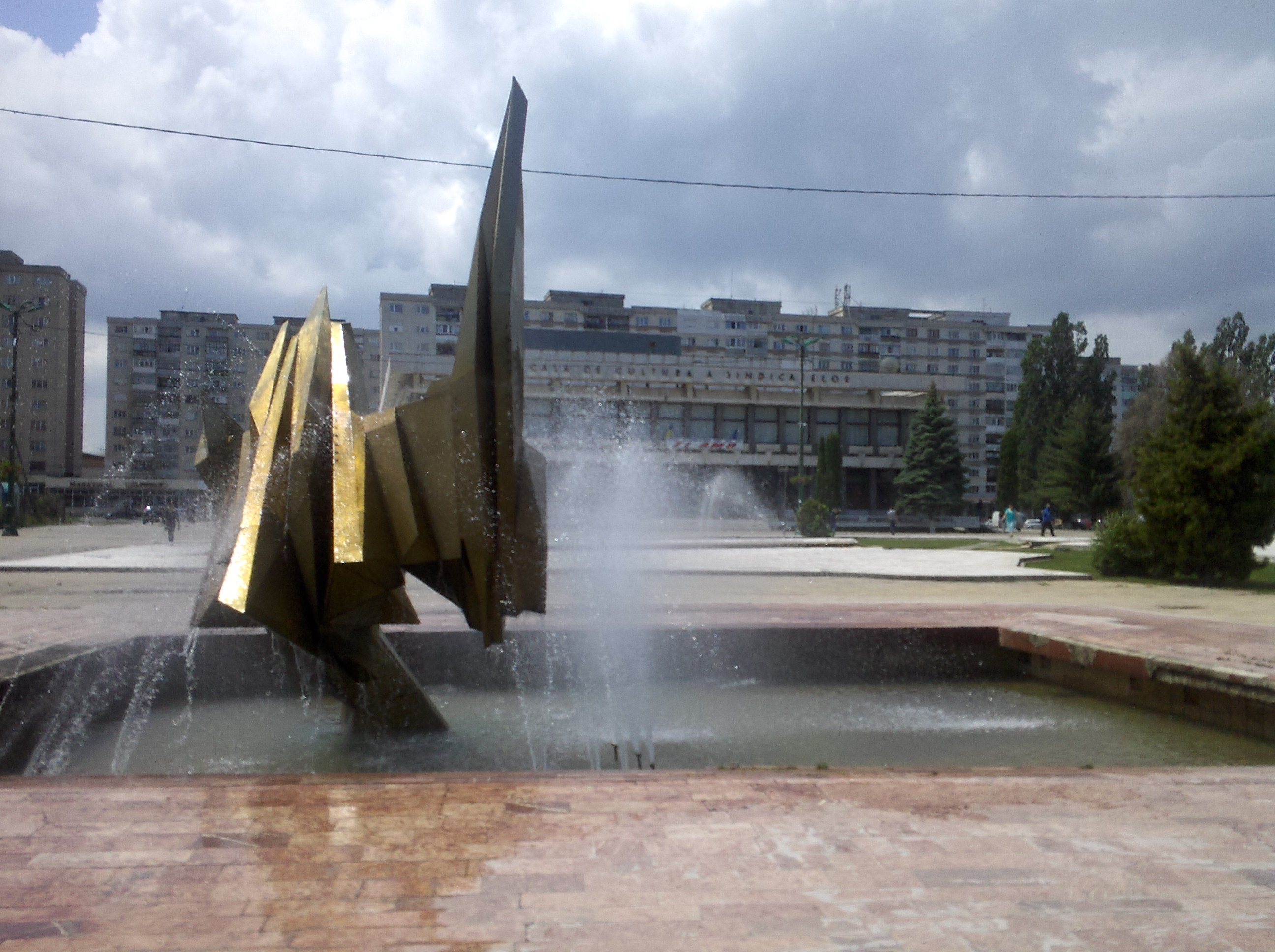
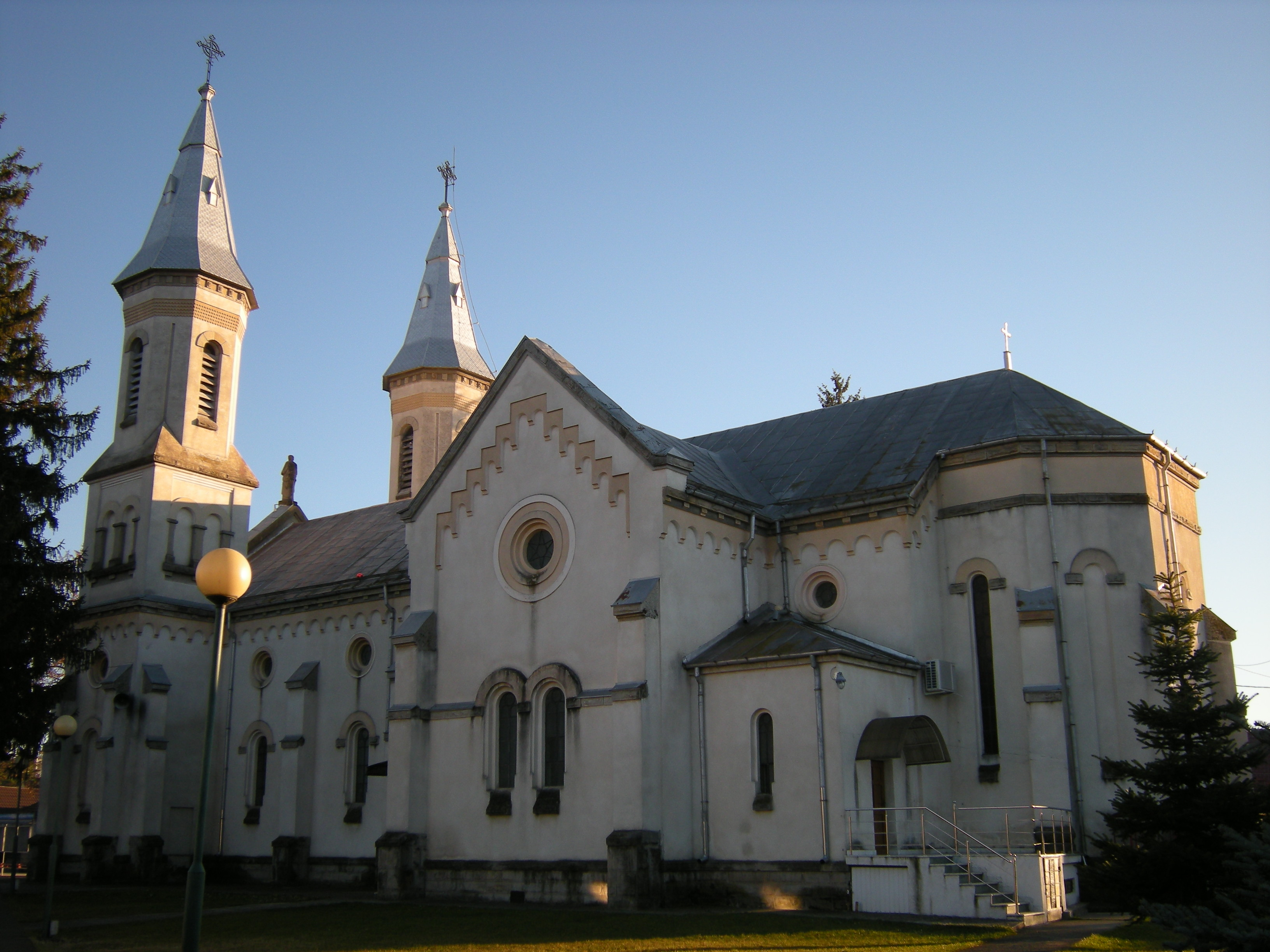
- View from Perchiu Hill Borzești Church Heroes Monument Salt Crystal artesian well Saints Peter and Paul Catholic Church

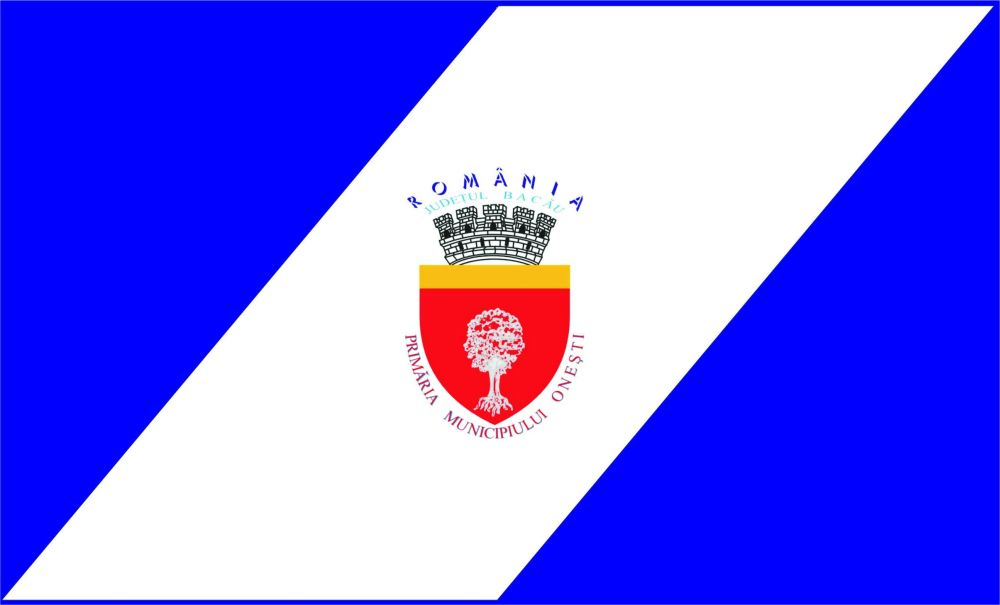
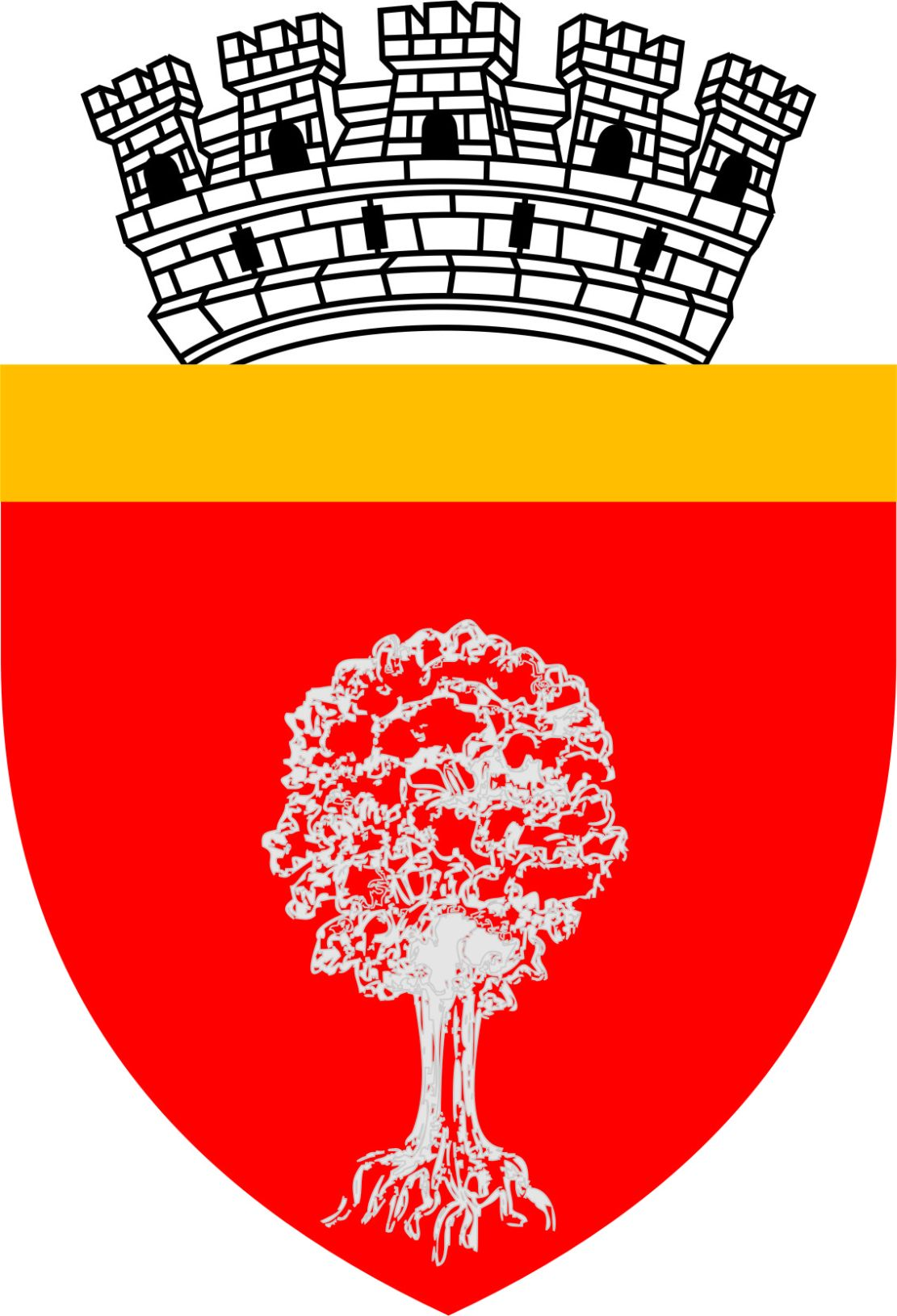
- Flag Coat of arms

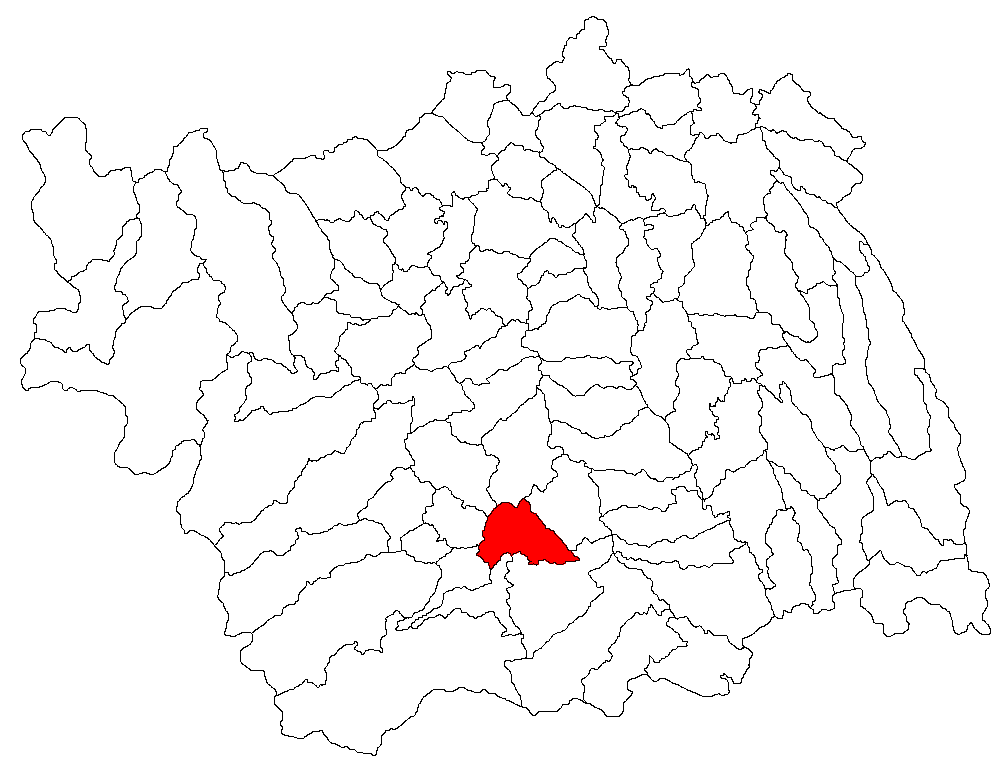
- Location in Bacău County

- Location in Romania
- Coordinates: 46°15′31″N 26°46′09″E
- Country: Romania
- County: Bacău

Government
  - Mayor (2024–2028): Adrian Jilcu (PSD)
- Area: 52.48 km^{2} (20.26 sq mi)
- Elevation: 210 m (690 ft)
- Highest elevation: 398 m (1,306 ft)
- Lowest elevation: 180 m (590 ft)
- Population (2021-12-01): 34,005
  - Density: 648.0/km^{2} (1,678/sq mi)
- Time zone: UTC+02:00 (EET)
  - Summer (DST): UTC+03:00 (EEST)
- Postal code: 601003–601159
- Area code: (+40) 0234
- Vehicle reg.: BC
- Website: www.onesti.ro

Onești (Romanian pronunciation: [oˈneʃtʲ]; Hungarian: Ónfalva), formerly known as Gheorghe Gheorghiu-Dej, is a city in Bacău County, Romania, with a population of 34,005 inhabitants as of 2021. It is situated in the historical region of Moldavia.

Administratively, the villages of Slobozia and Borzești form part of Onești.

== Etymology ==
Nine settlements named Onești were recorded in the Principality of Moldavia between the 14th and 17th centuries:

- Onești on the Cobâle (likely Misihănești, Bacău County): Documented in 1436 as a gift from the Prince to Dan Mesehnă.
- Onești on the Ciuhur and Trebnih (modern-day Onești, Edineț District, Moldova)
- Onești on the Prut (near Slobozia Oancea, Galați County): Granted to Fetina, daughter of Hărman; now a vanished settlement.
- Onești on the Miletin (modern-day Onești, Iași County): Granted to Zanfira, later redeemed by Ionașcu Stroici from the High Chamberlain Bernat.
- Onești on the Gârbovăț (modern-day Neamț County): Located on the border with Tălpălăcești; now a vanished settlement.
- Onești in Strășeni District, Moldova: A surviving village in its historical location.
- Onești (Oinești) in Cârligătura (near Hăușești, Iași County): Located on the border with Balosin. It historical passed through several hands, including protopope Ioil, Giurgiu the scribe, priest Petre, Vlădica the cupbearer, Neaniul the deacon, and eventually High Vornic Ureche; now a vanished settlement.
- Onești on the Trotuș (Bacău County): The historical precursor to the modern city of Onești. It was granted to the Bistrița Monastery, with parts later confirmed to Baloș Ciortan and others.
- Onești on the Sărata (near Berești, modern-day Ungheni District, Moldova): Noted for a pond confirmed to Toader Dragotă; now a vanished settlement.

The first documentary mention of Onești on the Trotuș dates to December 14, 1458, during the reign of Stephen the Great. The settlement was recorded in a royal land charter, which documented a donation made by Marușca, the daughter of court official Andrieș Slujascul and wife of Negrilă. In this act, she gifted several estates to the Bistrița Monastery, including Onești, Maluri, Lăbășești, Horgul's Well (the site of her father's monastery), and a half-share of both a watermill and the village of Slujești, where her father's court had been located.

The second historical mention of the settlement dates to April 5, 1488, when the regional governor Duma was granted an unpopulated settlement site on the Trotuș River by Stephen the Great. This site was previously associated with an individual recorded as "Oana from Moișa."

While local folk traditions popularized the myth that the city was named after a daughter of Stephen the Great named Oana, historians generally agree that the name derives from an early male landowner named Oană (or Oana) and his descendants, dating back to the foundation period of Moldavia. Scholars Ioan Bogdan and Mihai Costăchescu concluded that the "Oana" referenced in early texts was explicitly "Oană de la Moișa." During this era, Oană was a common male name among the Moldavian nobility, many of whom were rewarded with large estates for their military service to the ruling princes. This widespread usage explains why multiple villages named Onești emerged across historical Moldavia. Contemporary documents show the name used exclusively for men, including references to "Oana, brother of Chirilă" and a royal decree freeing a royal Tatar servant named Oana.

Alternative etymological theories suggest a Turkic origin for the name. Historian Neagu Djuvara argued that Oană is a Cuman name, along Tocsabă. Prior to this, historian Nicolae Iorga had highlighted the Cuman origins of the name Basarabă, as well as that of a Cuman nobleman named Tâncabă (the namesake of Tâncăbești in Ilfov County). Within the Trotuș region, several local toponyms reflect the historical presence of Eurasian steppe nomads. These include the Trotuș River itself (traditionally interpreted as "the river of the Tatars"), the Uz Valley (derived from the Oghuz Turks, known locally as uzi), and the town of Comănești (derived from the Cumans). Additionally, the nearby village of Borzești is named after Borzul (also recorded as Bortz or Borč), a Cuman chieftain documented in 1211.

According to ethnographer Gábor Lükő, the root on- in the name is a personal name of Turkic origin, suggesting that the earliest inhabitants of the settlement may have been of Tatar-Cuman descent.

While several Hungarian authors historically referred to the town as Ónfalva, modern Hungarian inhabitants do not use this term. Researcher Péter Halász noted that even the phonetic variant Onyest was historically rare in local Hungarian.

In the modern era, following the death of Romania's communist leader, the city was renamed Gheorghe Gheorghiu-Dej on March 22, 1965. It retained this official name until 1990, when it reverted to Onești following the Romanian Revolution.

== History ==
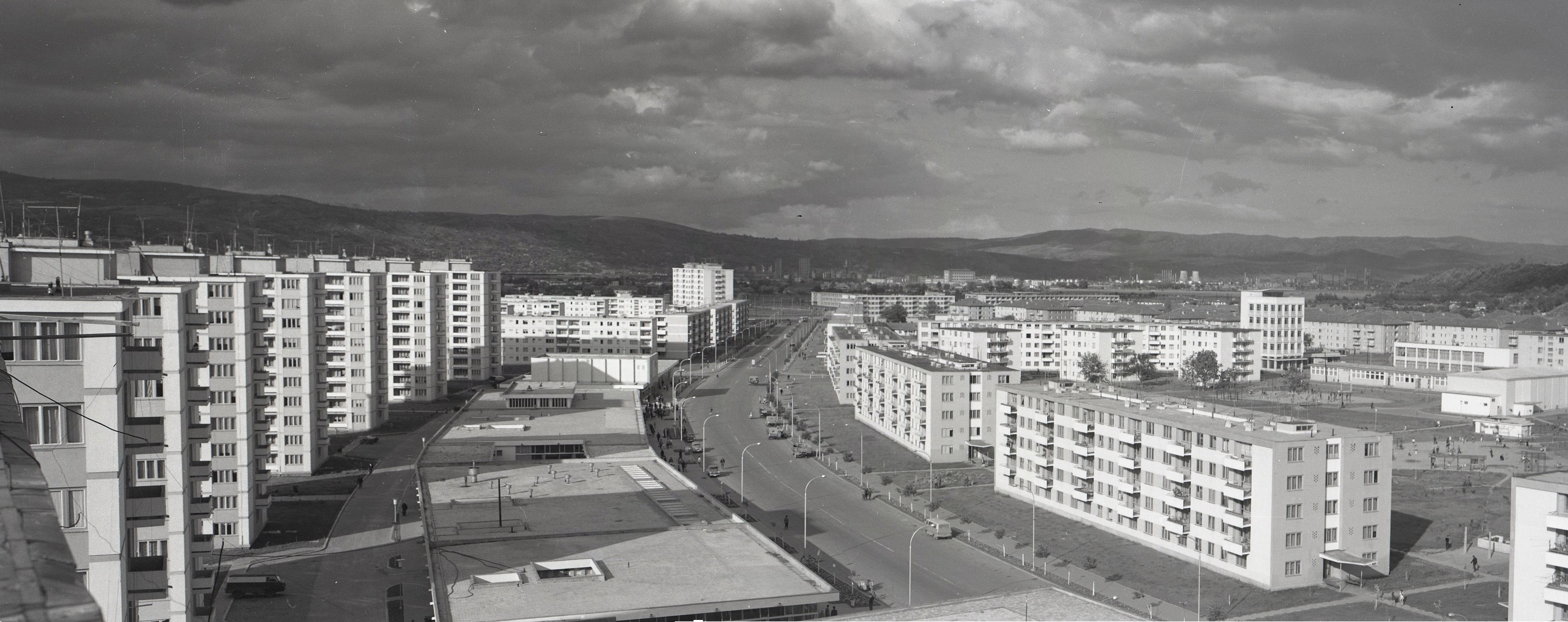
Onești in 1965

The locality was documentary attested as a village on 14 December 1458. In 1952, the communist authorities decided to build a large petrochemical industrial platform (Borzești Petrochemical Plant) and a new related city in the area of Onești and Borzești villages. Borzești, according to legend, was the birthplace of Stephen III of Moldavia. It is the site of the Borzești Church, which was built on his orders in 1493–1494.

At the death of the Communist leader Gheorghe Gheorghiu-Dej in March 1965, Onești was renamed Gheorghe Gheorghiu-Dej, but the name was changed back in 1990 shortly after the Romanian Revolution.

Above the borough Malu, on the right-hand side of the river Cașin, were discovered archaeological fragments from a settlement dating from the Neolithic Age.

== Demography ==
Ethnic composition of Onești
1. Romanians (79.8%)
2. Other (0.49%)
3. Unknown (19.8%)
Religious composition of Onești
1. Orthodox (69.4%)
2. Roman-Catholic (7.87%)
3. Other (2.00%)
4. Unknown (20.7%)

According to the 2021 census, the population of the municipality of Onești amounts to 34,005 inhabitants, a decrease compared to the previous census in 2011, when 39,172 inhabitants were recorded. The majority of the residents are Romanian (79.75%), while for 19.77%, their ethnic affiliation is unknown. From a confessional point of view, the majority of inhabitants are Orthodox (69.43%), with a Roman Catholic minority (7.87%), and for 20.69%, their confessional affiliation is unknown.

Historical population
Year	Pop.	±%
1956	11,253	—
1966	35,663	+216.9%
1977	41,738	+17.0%
1992	58,810	+40.9%
2002	51,681	−12.1%
2011	39,172	−24.2%
2021	34,005	−13.2%

== Economy ==
Onești is an industrial city with a well-developed economic structure centered around several industrial branches, particularly petrochemical processing on the Borzești Petrochemical Platform. On the city's industrial platform, garment manufacturing, woodworking, the food industry, and other services are other important branches.

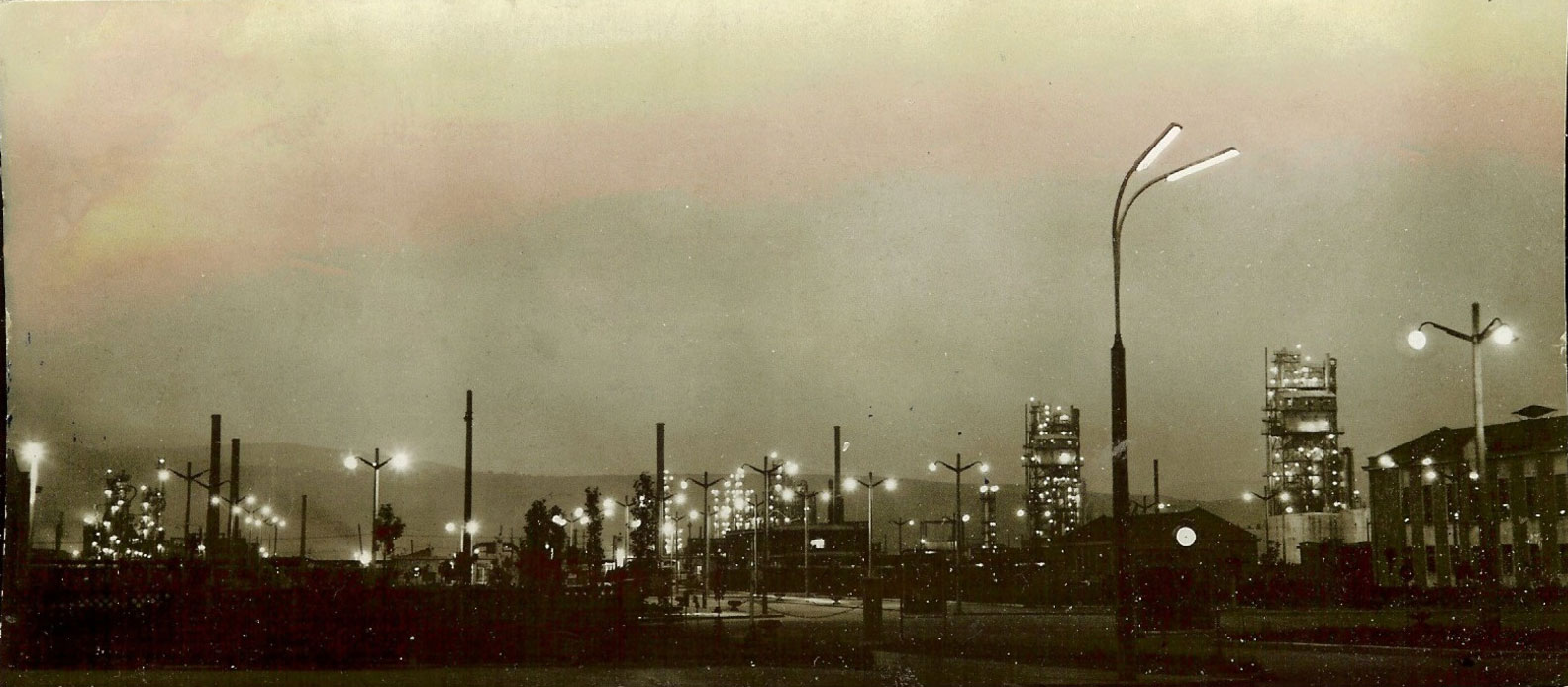
Refinery No. 10 Gheorghe Gheorghiu-Dej (1968)

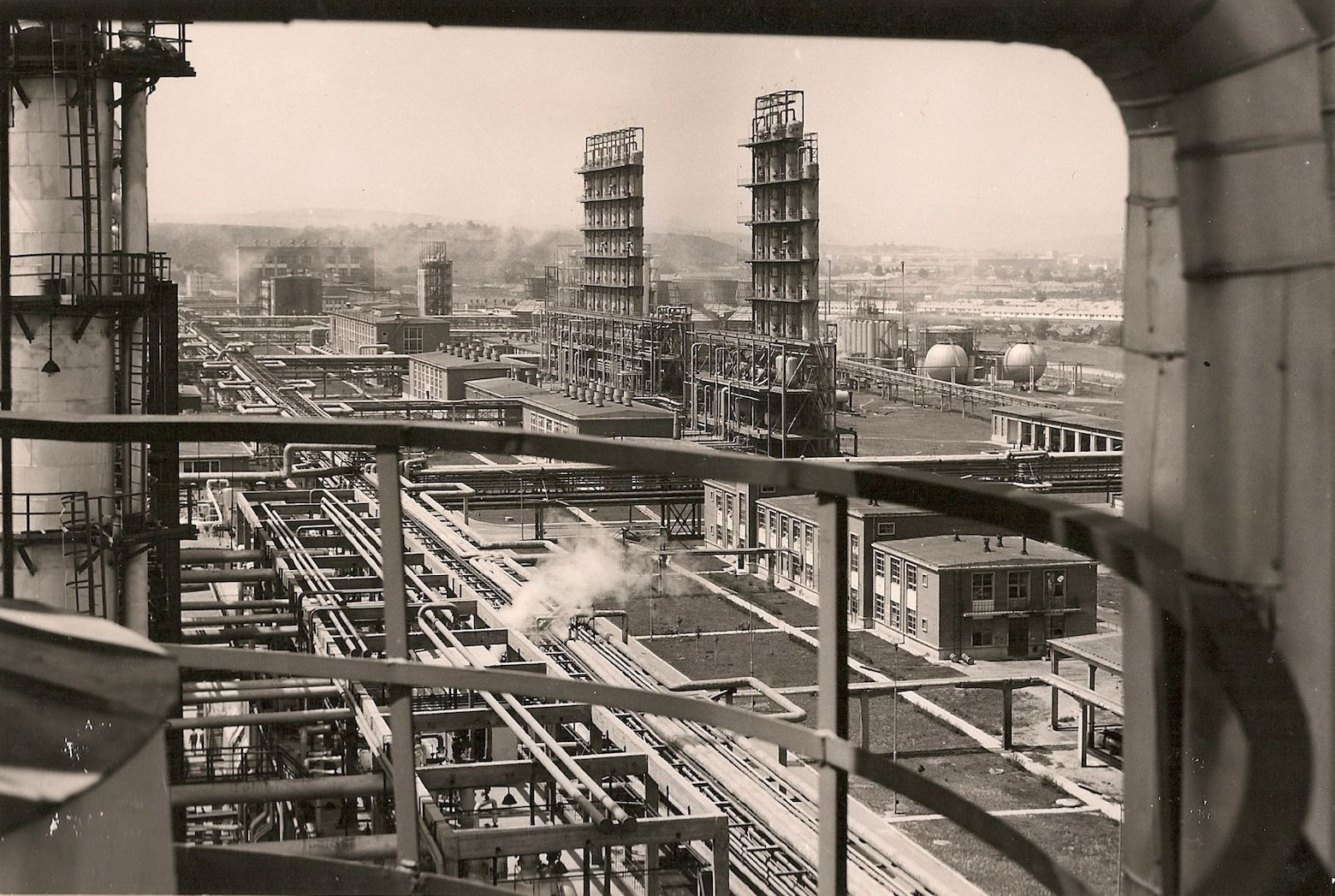
Gheorghe Gheorghiu-Dej Synthetic Rubber and Petrochemical Plant (1968)

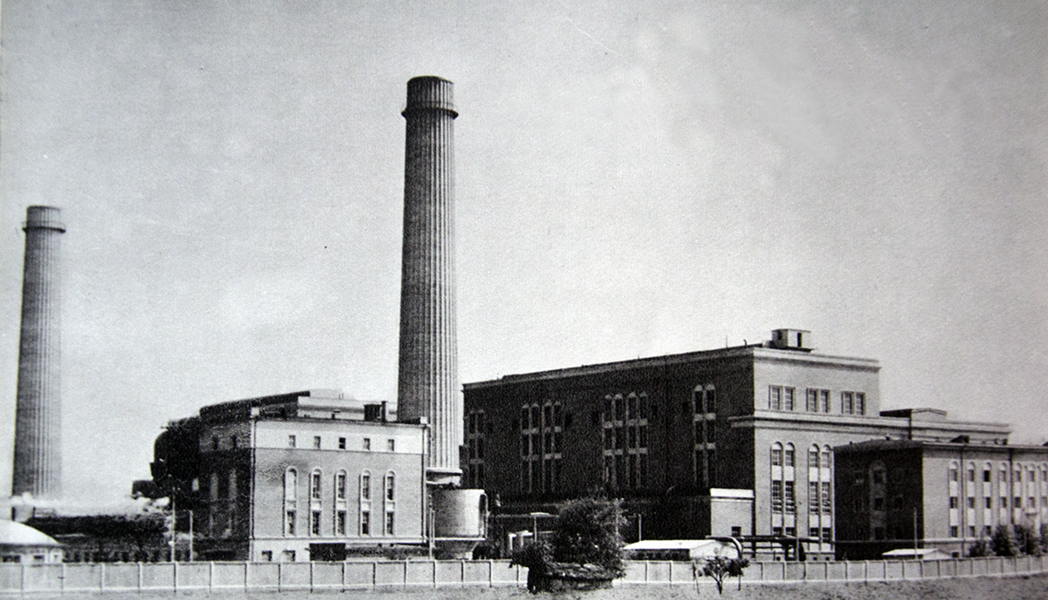
Borzești Power Station (1950s–1960s)

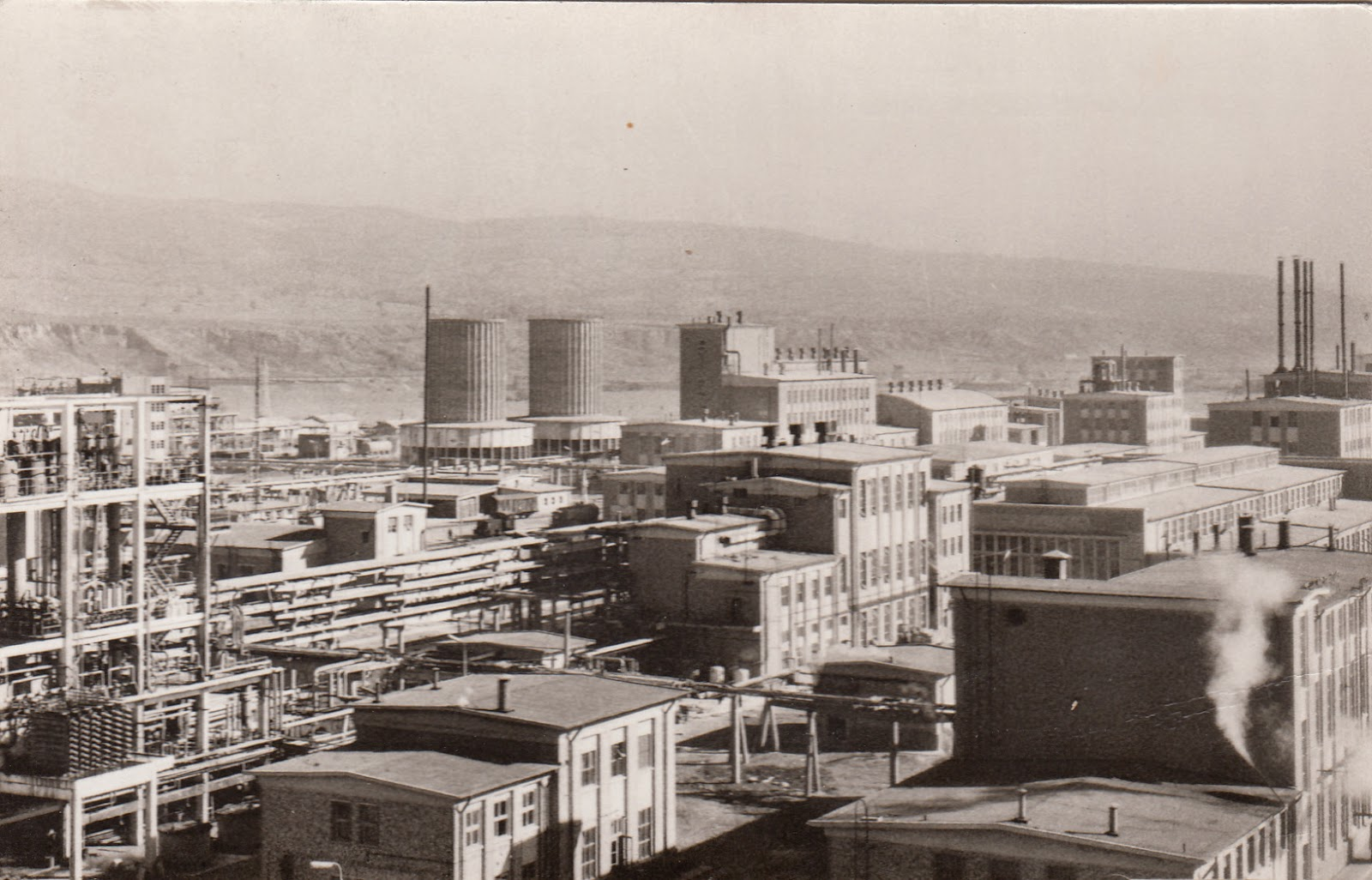
Borzești Chemical Plant (1960s)

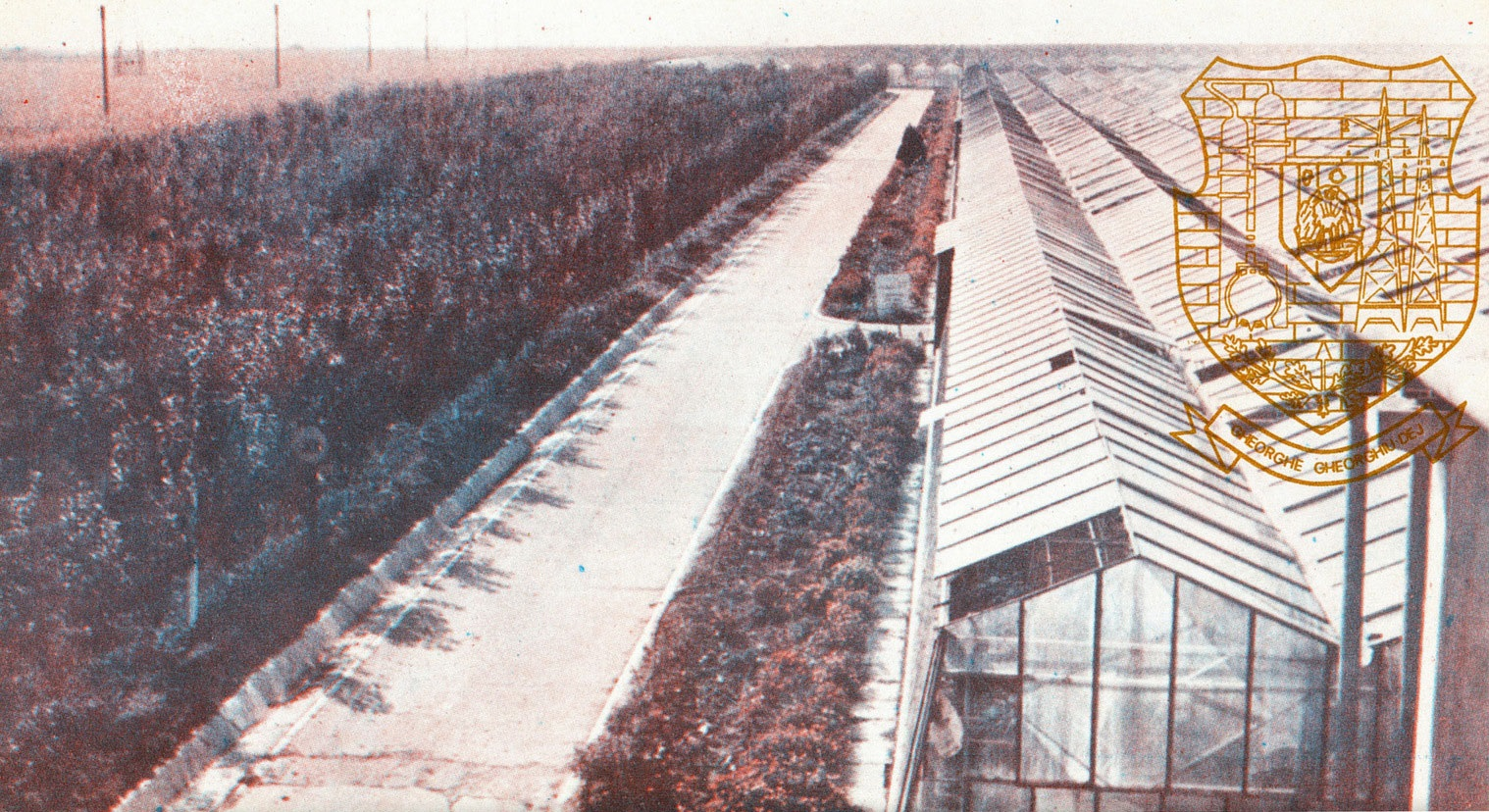
The Borzești Greenhouses, on Red Hill (1980s)

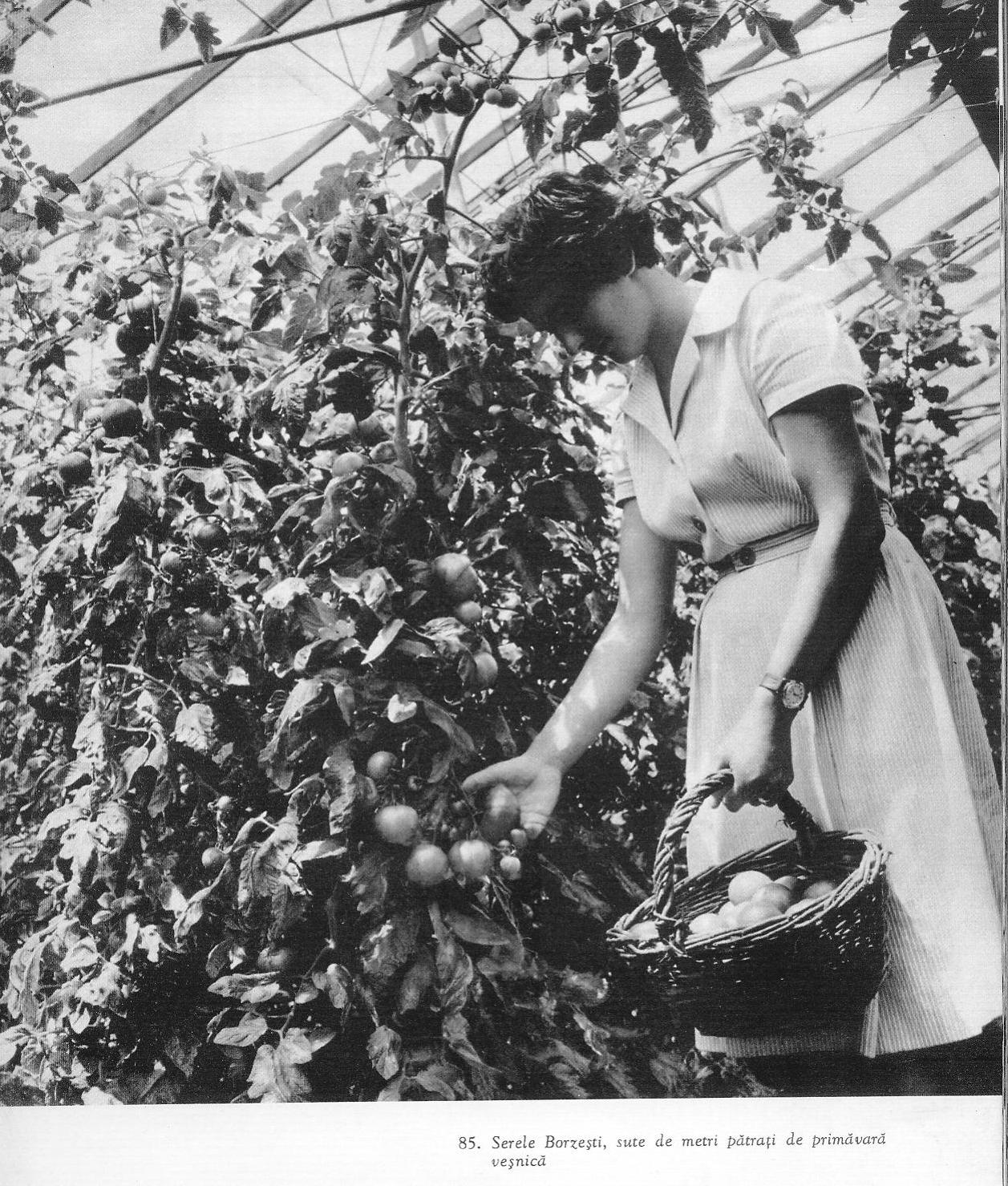
Interior of the Borzești Greenhouses

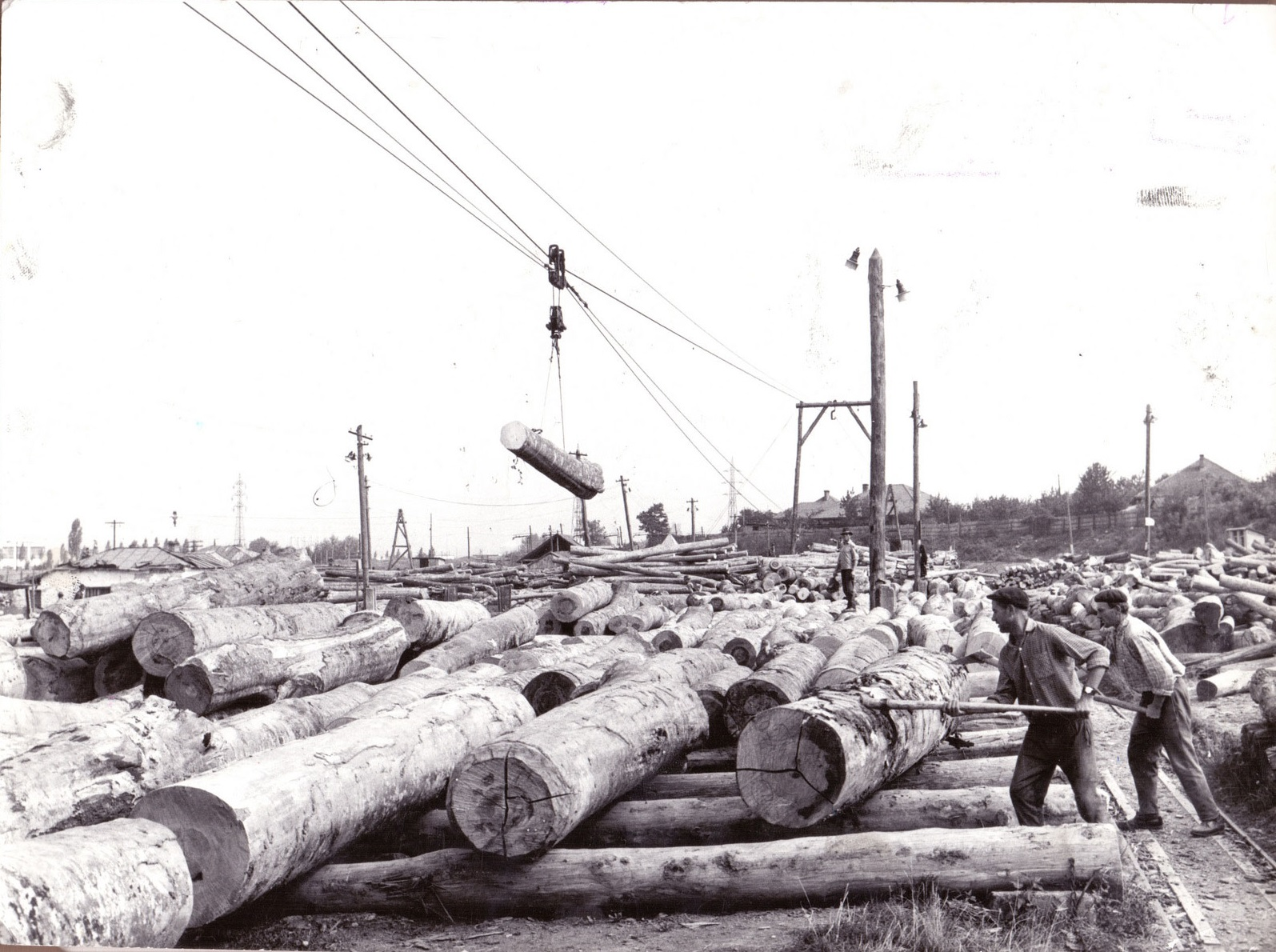
Onești Forestry Exploitation and Transport Enterprise (1969)

In 1842, a mill was built, worked by the slaves of the landowner Alecu Aslan, followed later by other small watermills. There were also two boyar distilleries for manufacturing grain brandy, as well as two blacksmith shops and two inns for marketing the alcoholic beverages produced in the area.

Chemical and Petrochemical Industry

- RAFO Onești (former Refinery No. 10 Onești), defunct
- CAROM (former Onești Synthetic Rubber and Petrochemical Plant), defunct
- Chimcomplex (former Borzești Chemical Plant)
- Aroma Rise (former Elon), synthetic perfumes and food flavorings

Electric and Thermal Energy Industry

- Sucursala Electrocentrale Borzești (Borzești Power Plant Branch), including the Borzești Power Station and Borzești II Power Station
- Transelectrica, via the Gutinaș 400/220/110 kV transformer substation
- Termon

Machine Building Industry

- UTON (former Borzești Chemical Equipment Enterprise, established in 1974), defunct unit
- GOSPOMAS (former Borzești Manufacturing Center, former CRCCFMS, spun off from the Bacău Agricultural Mechanization Station (SMA) in 1983), an enterprise for agricultural machinery, hydraulic pumps, and auto parts, defunct unit

Textile Industry

- MODEON (former garment factory, established in 1976), clothing factory operating under the lohn (cut-make-trim) system
- „Flacăra” SOCOM (National Union of Handicraft Cooperatives), a handicraft cooperative society
- Maremod
- Autoliv

Food Industry

- Croco
- Albrau Group
- Panimon (former bakery factory, established in 1978),[2] bakery products factory
- Agricultorul Group
- The Milk Factory, defunct
- SERON and SERE ONEȘTI (former Onești Greenhouses and Borzești Greenhouses), vegetable greenhouses established in 1963. The greenhouses inside the city were transformed into a Pa&Co factory, while those on Red Hill were demolished.
- The Ice and Juice Factory, defunct

Wood Industry

- Barlinek (former Forestry Exploitation and Transport Enterprise, privatized as Diana Forest), solid and engineered wood flooring factory
- Rich Forest, logging/wood exploitation (Chinese citizen Li Ning, the company's director, was declared undesirable for 10 years in December 2012 along with other compatriots due to organized crime offenses).
- Pa&Co International, doors and engineered wood flooring factories
- Smart Wood (former Pa&Co flooring), wooden sticks factory

Construction Industry

- Tehnocin (former Gheorghe Gheorghiu-Dej Industrial Construction Trust), defunct
- MECON (former Heavy Equipment and Transport Enterprise for Construction, IUGTC/SUGTC), defunct
- Energoconstrucția, defunct
- Confer Group, civil engineering works
- DMC AG, civil and industrial construction
- Gironap

Glass Industry

- SART GLASS (former glass factory), established in 1973. Defunct.
- Fredi

== Geography ==
Onești is located in the Tazlău-Cașin Depression of the Eastern Carpathians at an average altitude of 210 metres (690 ft). It lies at the confluence of the rivers Trotuș, Cașin, Oituz, and Tazlău, some 60 km (37 mi) southwest of the county capital, Bacău. The city is crossed by the European road E574 and by the national roads DN11A and DN12A that connect it to Bucharest, to the northern part of the country, and to Transylvania. Rail connections are made through the Căile Ferate Române network, and the proposed A13 Brașov–Bacău Motorway will link the city to the rest of Romania's highway network as a second connection to the country's major cities.

=== Climate ===
Onești has a hot-summer humid continental climate (Köppen: Dfa), with hot summer temperatures that frequently go above 30 °C (86 °F), and maximums reaching 35 °C (95 °F) almost every year. Winters are cool with moderate snowfall and highs safely above freezing. The town has a mean yearly temperature of 10–11 °C (50–52 °F), and annual precipitation totals around 600 mm. The most frequent winds blow from the west and south-west.

The microclimate of Onești is significantly shaped by the foehn effect, a consequence of the city's location within the Tazlău-Cașin Depression at the eastern foothills of the Eastern Carpathians. When prevailing westerly air masses ascend the western slopes of the Ciuc and Berzunți mountains, they cool and shed their moisture as precipitation.

The vegetation is specific to the temperate-continental zone: conifers, deciduous trees, and climbing plants. The area also has rare southern plants found in the Dealul Perchiu nature reserve, a designated Natura 2000 Site of Community Importance (SCI). Notable species include the downy oak, smoketree, dwarf almond, and the pedunculate oak, which reaches the absolute northernmost limit of its distribution here. These species that thrive in warmer climates are isolated far north of their typical habitats, usually belonging to the hot Balkan Peninsula, the Mediterranean basin, or the forest-steppes of Southeastern Europe.

The highest recorded temperature is 40.8 °C (105.4 °F), on 5 July 1916, and the lowest is −29.6 °C (−21.3 °F) on 25 January 1942. On 17 December 1989, Onești recorded a temperature of 23.3 °C (73.9 °F), just 0.1 °C lower than Romania's national December record of 23.4 °C (74.1 °F), set at Câmpina in 1985.

Climate data for Onești (elevation 242m, 2014–2026 normals, extremes 1945–present)
Month	Jan	Feb	Mar	Apr	May	Jun	Jul	Aug	Sep	Oct	Nov	Dec	Year
Record high °C (°F)	20.5 (68.9)	22.7 (72.9)	29.7 (85.5)	31.7 (89.1)	34.2 (93.6)	37.2 (99.0)	40.8 (105.4)	39.9 (103.8)	36.6 (97.9)	32.9 (91.2)	26.8 (80.2)	23.3 (73.9)	40.8 (105.4)
Mean maximum °C (°F)	14.6 (58.3)	17.3 (63.1)	23.0 (73.4)	26.2 (79.2)	29.2 (84.6)	33.6 (92.5)	34.8 (94.6)	34.9 (94.8)	31.5 (88.7)	26.1 (79.0)	20.0 (68.0)	15.9 (60.6)	35.7 (96.3)
Mean daily maximum °C (°F)	4.8 (40.6)	7.1 (44.8)	11.9 (53.4)	17.3 (63.1)	21.9 (71.4)	27.1 (80.8)	29.1 (84.4)	29.4 (84.9)	24.1 (75.4)	17.4 (63.3)	10.2 (50.4)	6.4 (43.5)	17.2 (63.0)
Daily mean °C (°F)	0.4 (32.7)	2.4 (36.3)	6.5 (43.7)	11.3 (52.3)	15.9 (60.6)	21.1 (70.0)	22.8 (73.0)	22.7 (72.9)	18.0 (64.4)	11.7 (53.1)	5.9 (42.6)	2.6 (36.7)	11.8 (53.2)
Mean daily minimum °C (°F)	−4.1 (24.6)	−2.2 (28.0)	1.1 (34.0)	5.2 (41.4)	9.9 (49.8)	15.1 (59.2)	16.5 (61.7)	16.1 (61.0)	11.8 (53.2)	5.9 (42.6)	1.6 (34.9)	−1.2 (29.8)	6.3 (43.3)
Mean minimum °C (°F)	−13.7 (7.3)	−10.8 (12.6)	−5.9 (21.4)	−1.6 (29.1)	4.0 (39.2)	9.5 (49.1)	11.6 (52.9)	11.4 (52.5)	4.9 (40.8)	−0.8 (30.6)	−4.9 (23.2)	−9.3 (15.3)	−14.6 (5.7)
Record low °C (°F)	−29.6 (−21.3)	−26.6 (−15.9)	−18.3 (−0.9)	−5.7 (21.7)	−0.2 (31.6)	4.9 (40.8)	7.5 (45.5)	5.4 (41.7)	−4.2 (24.4)	−8.2 (17.2)	−19.9 (−3.8)	−22.6 (−8.7)	−29.6 (−21.3)
Average precipitation mm (inches)	23.6 (0.93)	17.0 (0.67)	35.2 (1.39)	44.2 (1.74)	81.9 (3.22)	105.7 (4.16)	75.2 (2.96)	67.3 (2.65)	50.9 (2.00)	47.6 (1.87)	40.0 (1.57)	31.2 (1.23)	619.8 (24.39)
Average precipitation days (≥ 1.0 mm)	4.4	4.5	6.7	7.5	10.1	10.9	8.9	5.4	6.0	5.3	5.9	5.8	81.4
Average snowy days	7.1	5.6	3.5	1.0	0	0	0	0	0	0	2.5	4.6	24.3
Source 1: Meteomanz (2014-2026)
Source 2: Târgu Ocna Meteo Station (1945-2005)

== Culture ==
Saint Nicholas is the patron saint of the city, whose inhabitants are predominantly Romanian Orthodox. St. Nicholas Day, 6 December, is the municipal day of Onești.

Popular tourist attractions are Perchiu Hill and the Hero Cross from atop the aforementioned hill, the Municipal History Museum, a steel monument dedicated to the Romanian national poet Mihai Eminescu, and the city park.

== Administration and politics ==
The municipality of Onești is administered by a mayor and a local council composed of 19 councilors. The mayor, Adrian Jilcu, from the Social Democratic Party, has been in office since 1 November 2024. Following the 2024 local elections, the local council has the following composition by political party:

Party	Councilors	Council Composition
Social Democratic Party	10	10 / 19
National Liberal Party	5	5 / 19
Save Romania Union	2	2 / 19
Alliance for the Union of Romanians	2	2 / 19

== Mayors ==
- Emil Lemnaru (PSD), 1996–2012
- Victor-Laurențiu Neghină (PSD), 2012–2015
- Alexandru Cristea (UNPR), 2015–2016
- Nicolae Gnatiuc (PSD), 2016–2020
- Victor-Laurențiu Neghină (PMP), 2020–2024
- Adrian Jilcu (PSD), 2024–2028

== Notable people ==
- Nadia Comăneci (born 1961), gymnast
- Stephen the Great (born 1433 or 1440), Voivode of Moldavia from 1457 until 1504
- Antonio Andrușceac (born 1967), politician
- Mihail Aslan (born 1857), general in World War I
- Gabriel Bruchental (born 1965), footballer
- Diana Chelaru (born 1993), gymnast
- Daniel Dines (born 1972), entrepreneur
- Teodora Enache (born 1967), jazz singer
- Georgeta Gabor (born 1962), gymnast
- Loredana Groza (born 1970), singer
- Ștefania Jipa (born 2000), handball player
- Gheorghe Maftei (born 1955), weightlifter
- Laura Moise (born 1976), judoka
- Daniel Munteanu (born 1978), football player and manager
- Alexandru Nazare (born 1980), politician
- Ana Maria Pavăl (born 1983), wrestler
- Adrian Rotaru (born 1994), handballer
- Eduard Tismănaru (born 1987), footballer
- Dumitrița Turner (born 1964), artistic gymnast
- Silvia Zarzu (born 1998), artistic gymnast

== Twin towns and sister cities ==
- Pistoia, Italy
- Strășeni, Moldova (2015)
- Skien, Norway
- Eysines, France

== See also ==
- CSM Borzești
- FCM Dinamo Onești
