= Cașin (Trotuș) =

- Location within Romania

Location
- Country: Romania
- Counties: Bacău County
- Villages: Mănăstirea Cașin, Lupești, Cașin, Onești

Physical characteristics
- Mouth: Trotuș
  - location: Onești
  - coordinates: 46.2590°N 26.7652°E
- Length: 54 km (34 mi)
- Basin size: 308 km^{2} (119 sq mi)

Basin features
- Progression: Trotuș→ Siret→ Danube→ Black Sea

The Cașin is a right tributary of the river Trotuș in Romania. It discharges into the Trotuș in Onești. Its length is 54 km (34 mi) and its basin size is 308 km^{2} (119 sq mi).

== Tributaries ==
The following rivers are tributaries to the river Cașin (from source to mouth):

- Left: Dobrii, Bucieș, Curița
- Right: Zboina, Marmora, Haloșul Mic, Haloșul Mare, Haloșul Ciubotaru, Buciumi
