= Cașin =

- Commune
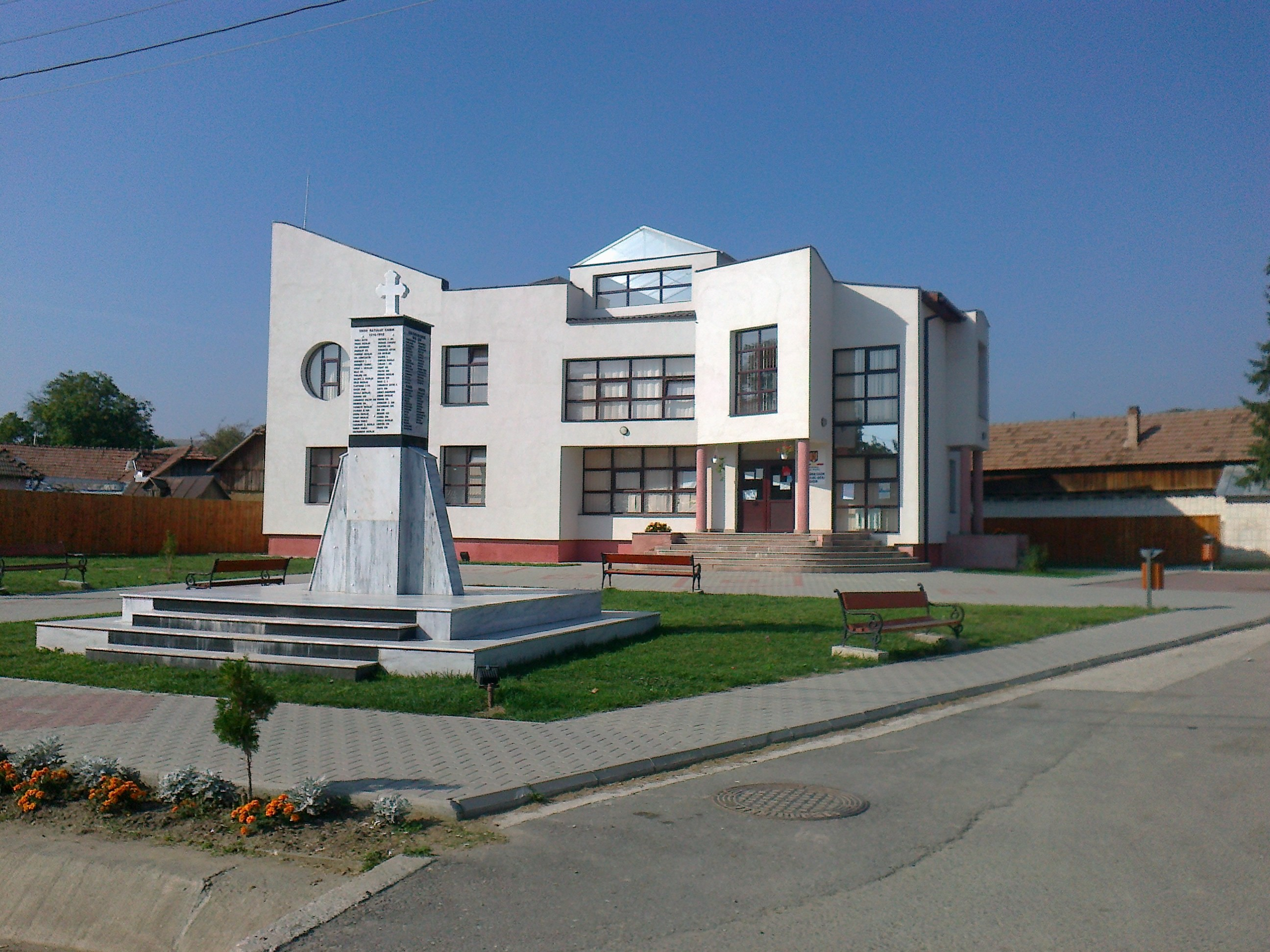
- Cașin town hall

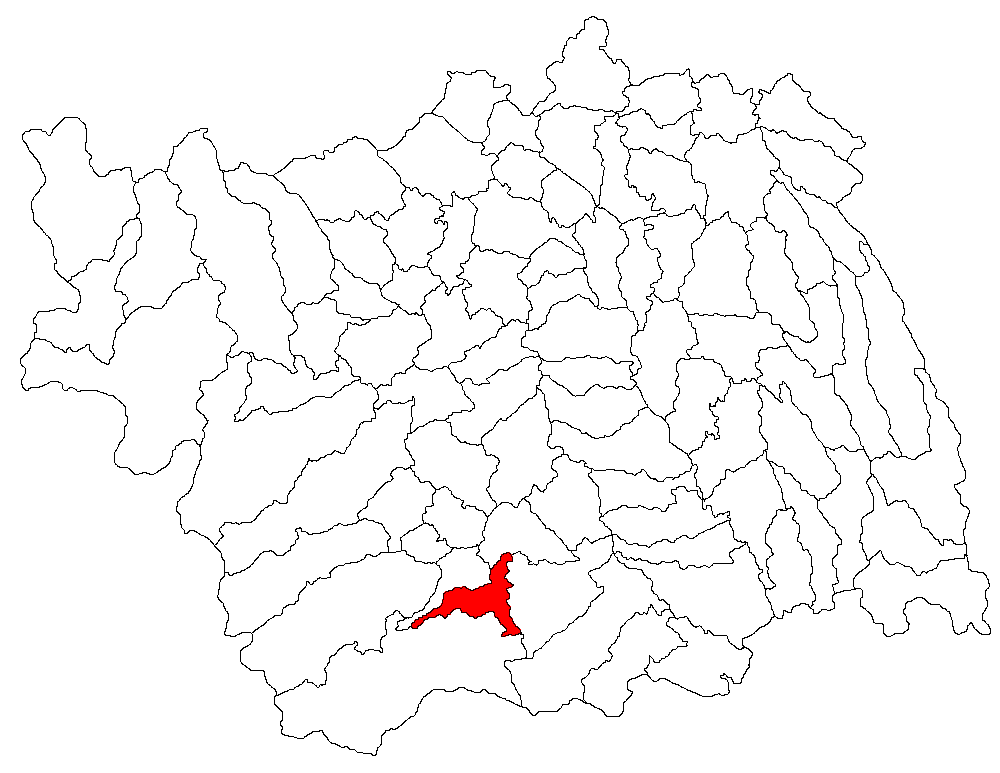
- Location in Bacău County

- Location in Romania
- Coordinates: 46°12′N 26°45′E
- Country: Romania
- County: Bacău

Government
  - Mayor (2024–2028): Ioan-Cosmin Curelea (PSD)
- Area: 38 km^{2} (15 sq mi)
- Elevation: 254 m (833 ft)
- Population (2021-12-01): 3,586
  - Density: 94/km^{2} (240/sq mi)
- Time zone: UTC+02:00 (EET)
  - Summer (DST): UTC+03:00 (EEST)
- Postal code: 607090
- Area code: +(40) 234
- Vehicle reg.: BC
- Website: comunacasin.ro

Cașin is a commune in Bacău County, Western Moldavia, Romania. It is composed of two villages, Cașin and Curița.

Historical population
Year	Pop.	±%
2002	3,749	—
2011	3,387	−9.7%
2021	3,586	+5.9%
Source: Census data
