= Mănăstirea Cașin =

- Commune
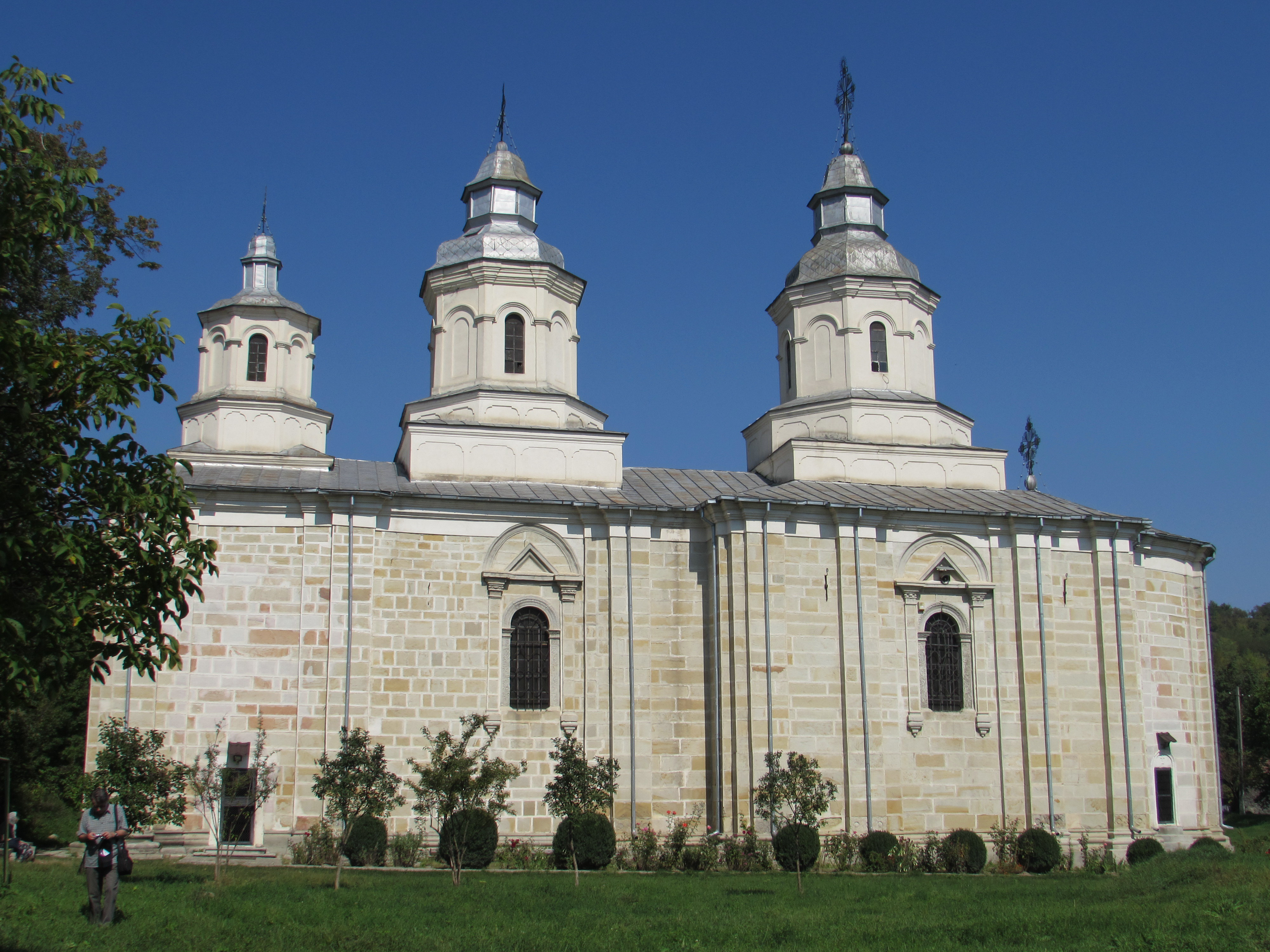
- Cașin Monastery

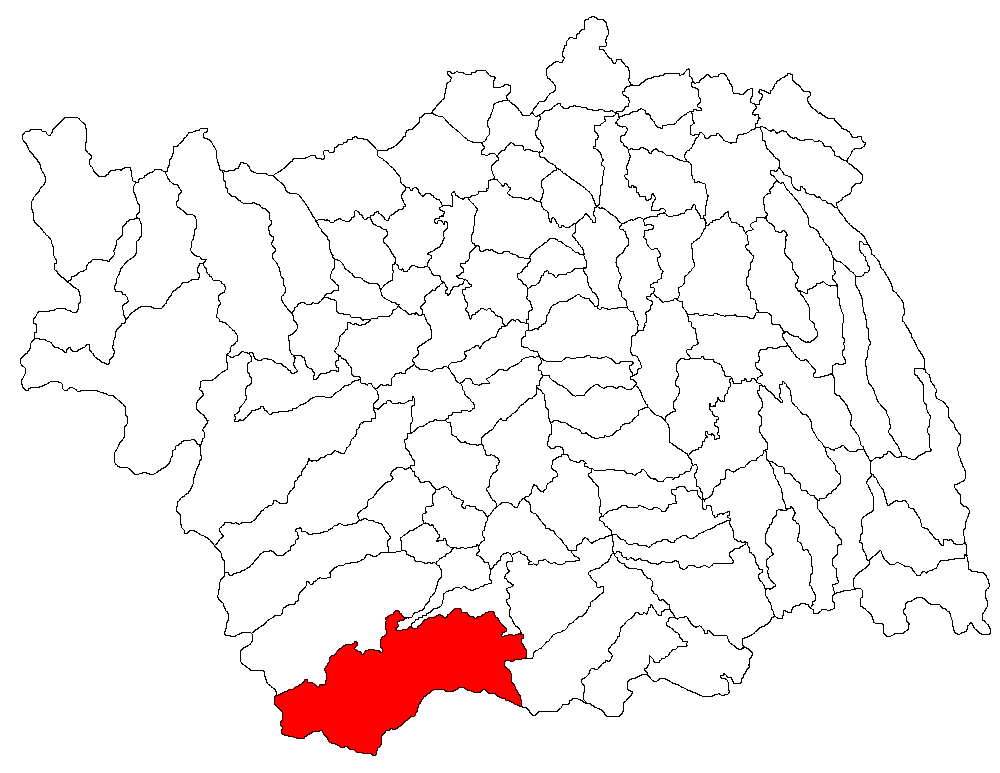
- Location in Bacău County

- Location in Romania
- Coordinates: 46°9′N 26°41′E
- Country: Romania
- County: Bacău

Government
  - Mayor (2024–2028): George Adrian Bucur (PSD)
- Area: 243.27 km^{2} (93.93 sq mi)
- Elevation: 352 m (1,155 ft)
- Population (2021-12-01): 4,922
  - Density: 20.23/km^{2} (52.40/sq mi)
- Time zone: UTC+02:00 (EET)
  - Summer (DST): UTC+03:00 (EEST)
- Postal code: 607310
- Area code: +(40) 0234
- Vehicle reg.: BC
- Website: manastireacasin.ro

Mănăstirea Cașin is a commune in Bacău County, Western Moldavia, Romania. It is composed of four villages: Lupești, Mănăstirea Cașin, Pârvulești, and Scutaru.

The commune is situated in the Tazlău–Cașin Depression of the Moldavian Subcarpathians, on the banks of the river Cașin. It is located at the southwestern extremity of the county, on the border with the Vrancea and Covasna counties. Mănăstirea Cașin is crossed by county road DJ115, which leads to the city of Onești, 16 kilometres (10 mi) to the north.

The Cașin Monastery, located in the Mănăstirea Cașin village, was founded in 1655 by Voivode Gheorghe Ștefan.
