= Borzești =

Borzeşti may refer to several places in Romania:

- Borzeşti, a village in Oneşti City, Bacău County
  - Borzeşti Church, built at the order of Ştefan cel Mare in 1494
- Borzeşti, a village in Ungureni Commune, Botoşani County
- Borzeşti, a village in Iara Commune, Cluj County

== See also ==
- Borzești Petrochemical Plant, Oneşti
- Borzești Power Station, Oneşti
- Borzești II Power Station, Oneşti
