= Borzești Petrochemical Plant =

Industrial complex in Romania

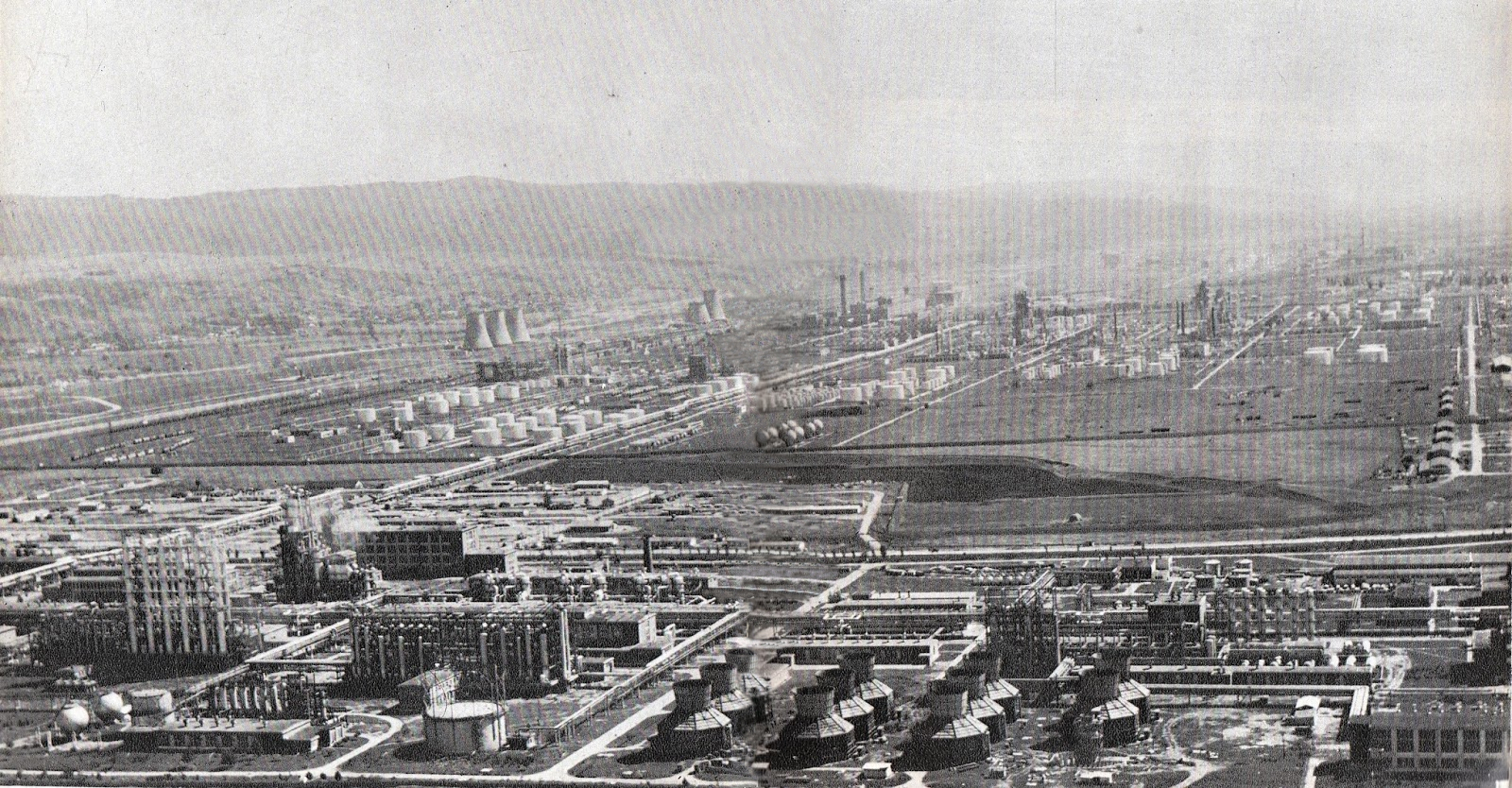
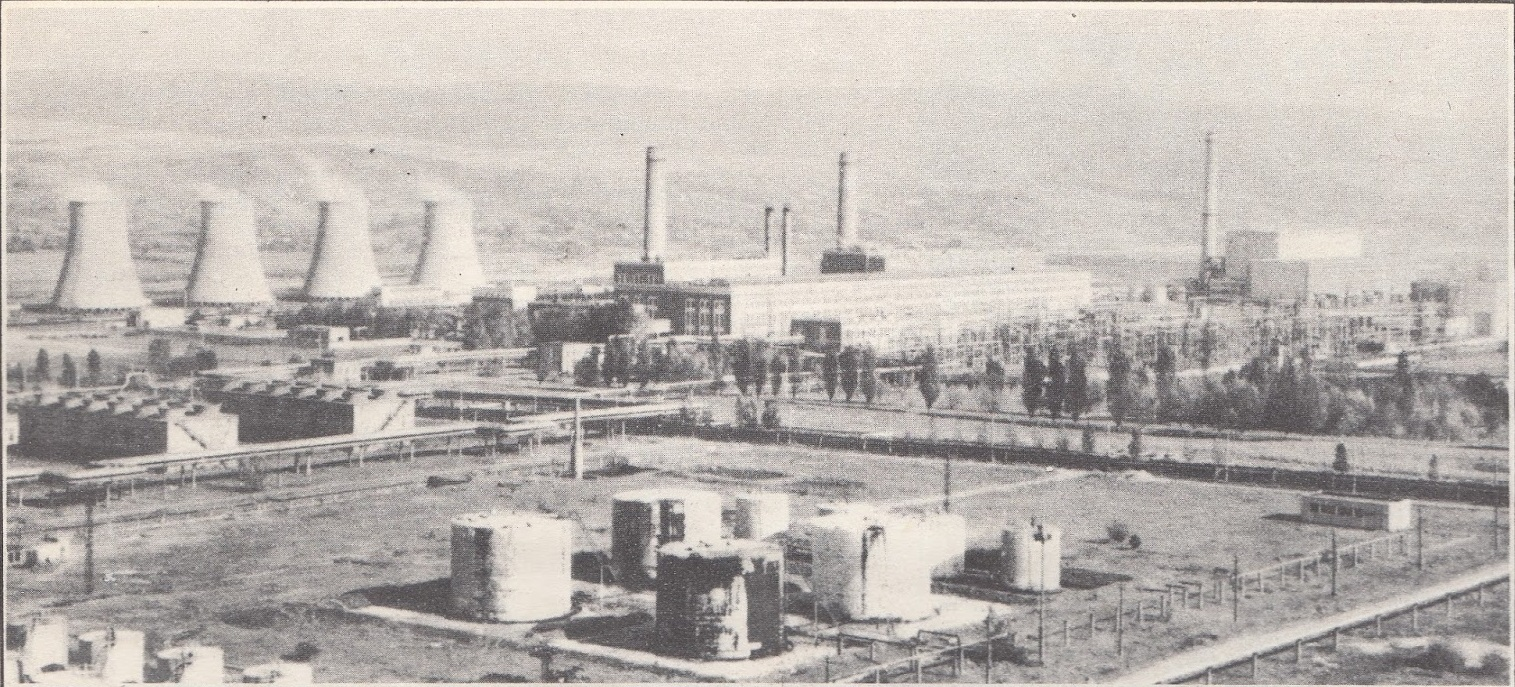
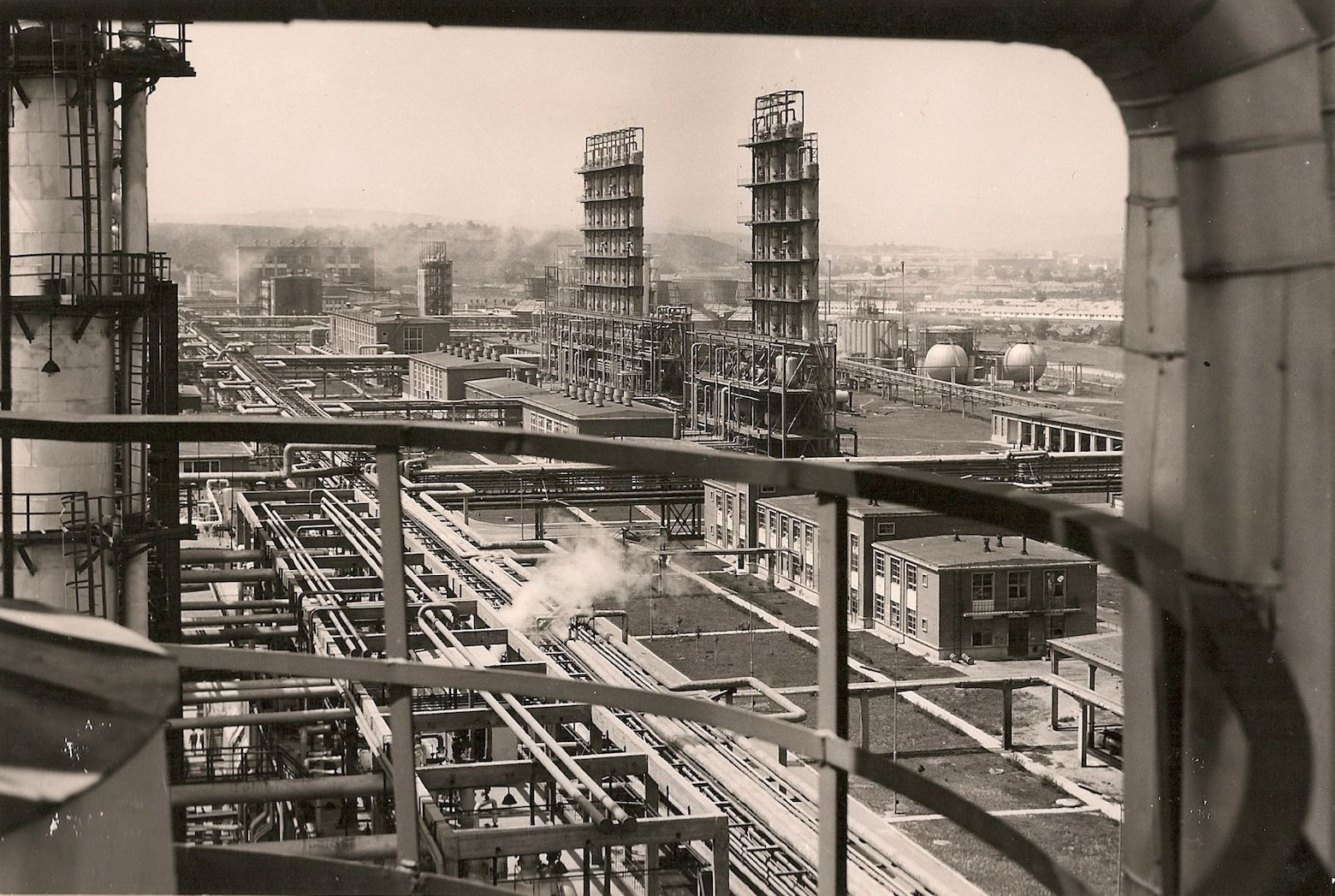
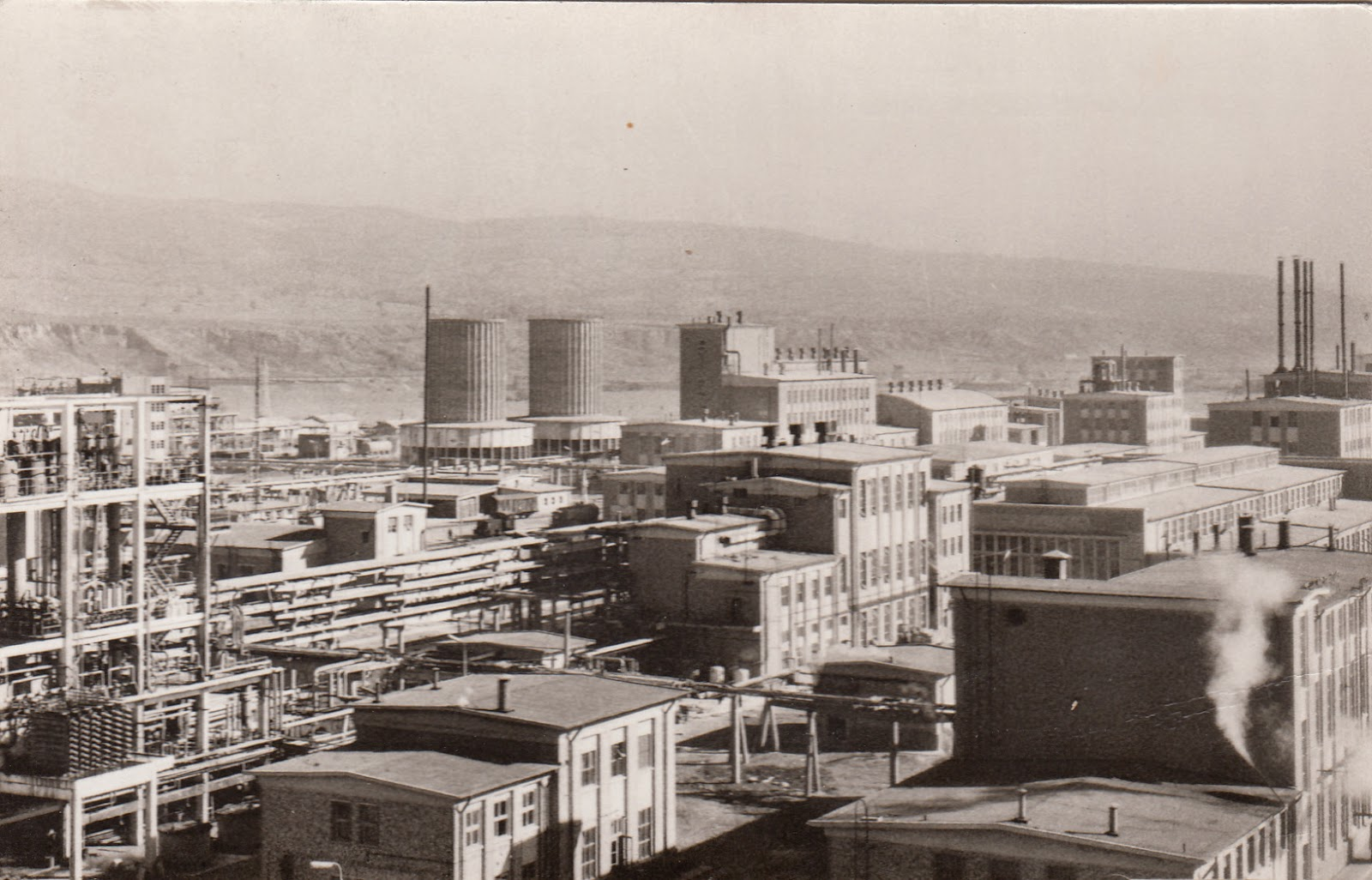
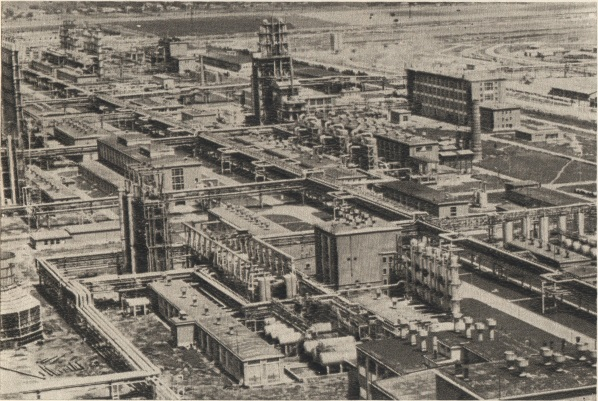
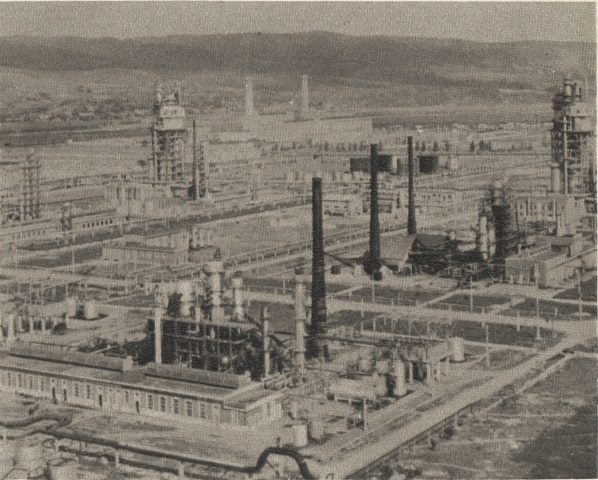
- Type: Public
- Industry: Oil refining, petrochemical industry, chemical industry, energy
- Founded: 1952
- Founders: Mihail Florescu, Minister of Chemical Industry (1952 – 1957) in First Gheorghiu-Dej cabinet
- Headquarters: Onești, Romania
- Revenue: ROL 7 billion (1979)
- Number of employees: 12,000 (1989)

Borzeşti Petrochemical Plant (formerly GIP - Borzeşti Petrochemical Industrial Group) is an industrial complex consisting of five large-scale plants: Synthetic Rubber and Petrochemicals Complex, No. 10 Oil Refinery, Borzești Chemical Plant, Borzești Power Plant and Chemical Equipment Company, being the largest industrial complex in Bacău County and the largest unit of its kind in Romania, which covers an area of 1,038 hectares (2,560 acres), with an average length of 9.4 km (5.8 mi) and a width of 1.8 to 3.4 km (1.1 to 2.1 mi). It is located on the Trotuș Valley, on the northeastern outskirts of Onești (named between 1965 and 1990 Gheorghe Gheorghiu-Dej).

Its construction began in 1952 and the first plants were put into operation in 1956 at the No. 10 Oil Refinery.

On April 1, 1969, the three distinct plants on the industrial platform in Borzeşti merged into the giant "Petrochemical Industrial Group Borzeşti" complex, and in 1973 it was renamed the "Borzeşti Petrochemical Plant". The abandonment of the centralized management system of the Romanian economy in 1990 determined the reappearance of the distinct entities, thus the Petrochemical Platform was divided into the private companies: Carom Onești, Rafo, Chimcomplex, Întreprinderea Electrocentrale Borzeşti and Uton.

== Emplacement ==
The space occupied by the petrochemical plant is located in the north-northeast of Onești, near the former village of Borzești. It stretches on the lower terraces of the Trotuș River in the valley of the confluence area with altitudes of 5 to 7 m (16 to 23 ft) and 10 to 15 m (33 to 49 ft). It has a rectangular shape oriented north-east, southwest with an average length of 9.4 km (5.8 mi) and a width 1.8 to 3.4 km (1.1 to 2.1 mi). The choice of place is motivated by the relatively flat levels of the terraced bridges, with passages dimmed by the colluvium, the presence of the Trotuş River water on the northern and north-eastern side, the existence of the communication ways.

== History ==
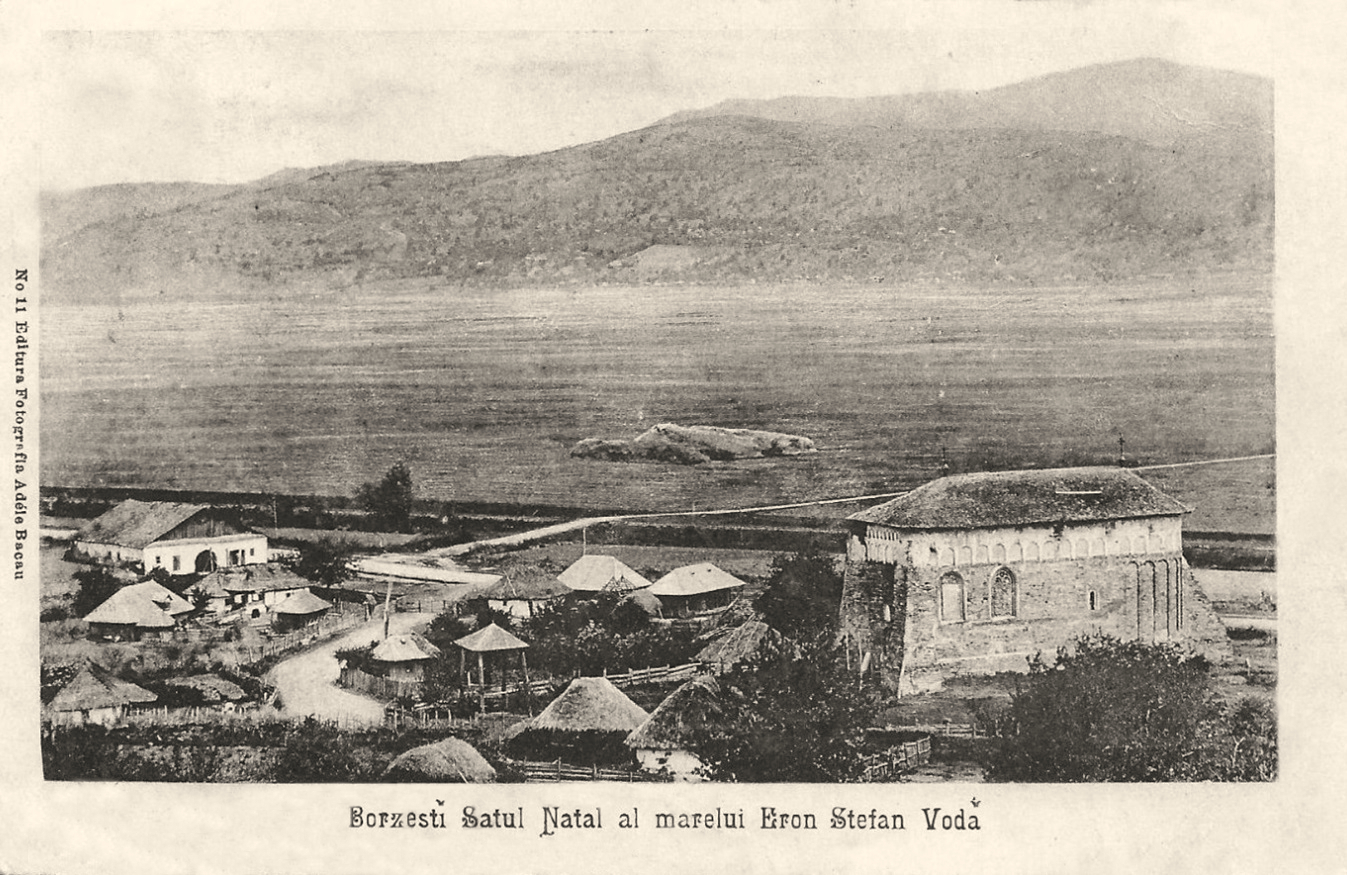
The village of Borzesti in 1904. In the foreground Borzești Church and in the far plan the field of the future industrial complex

In 1952, a team of geographers and urbanists headed by Mihail Florescu, Minister of Chemical Industry, went to the Trotuş Valley to establish the location of a city and a large industrial compound. In this team was also the geographer Vintilă M. Mihăilescu. It was preferred Onești because:

1. is located at the meeting place of Trotuș River (158 km [98 mi]) with its most important tributaries: Cașin River (45 km [28 mi]), Oituz River (57 km [35 mi]) and Tazlău River (85 km [53 mi]).
2. is situated at a convergence of roads in four main directions: towards Brașov via Târgu Secuiesc through the Oituz Pass; towards Târgu Ocna (with a branch to Slănic-Moldova), Comănești (with a branch to Moinești) and Miercurea Ciuc through Ghimes-Palanca Pass; towards Bacău, through the Tazlău subcarpathian depression (with a branch pointing to Moinești); towards Adjud, in the lower valley of the Trotuș River.
3. is seated in a well-populated area.
4. is set in a relief made up of a slab built of sandstone gravel in a thick blanket covered with clay, consisting of two terraces, a taller one and a lower one.

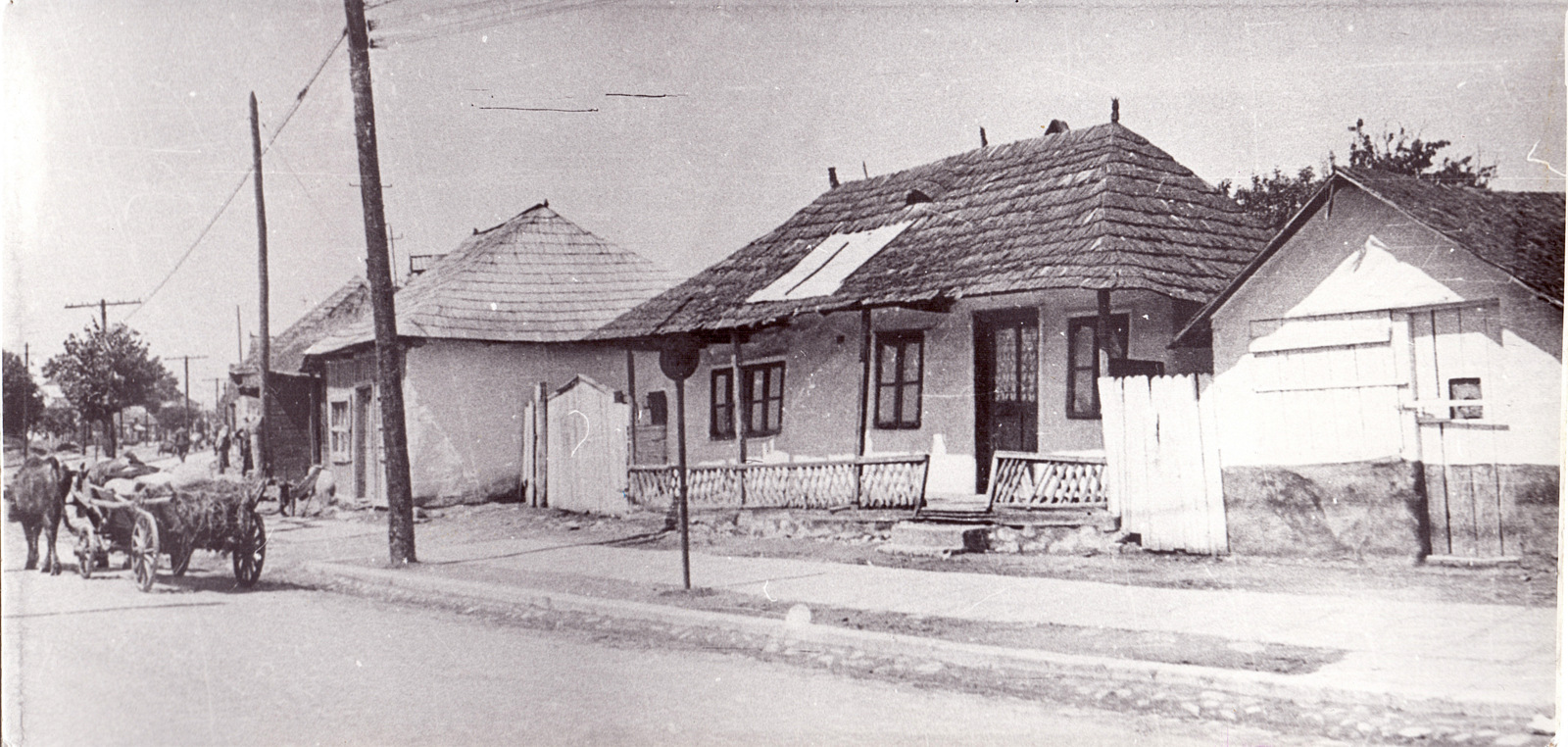
Perspective on a street of the old town of Onești before reconstruction

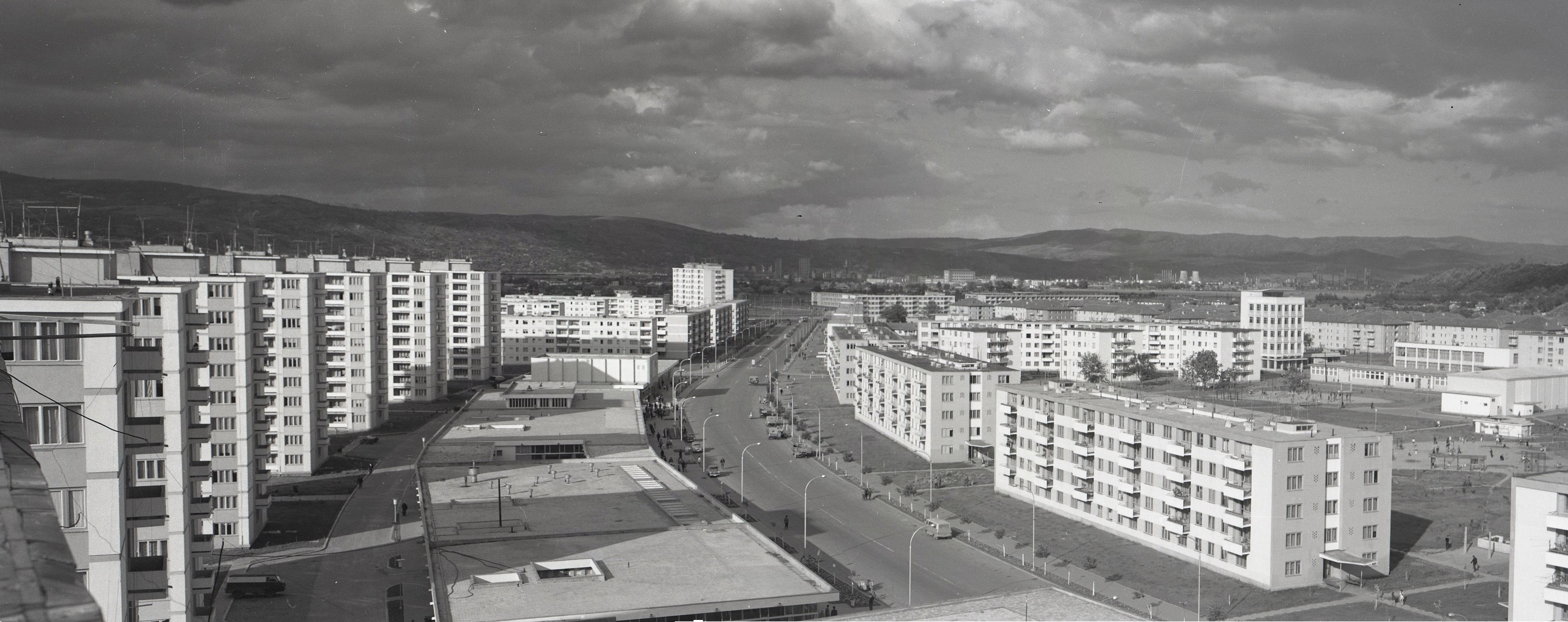

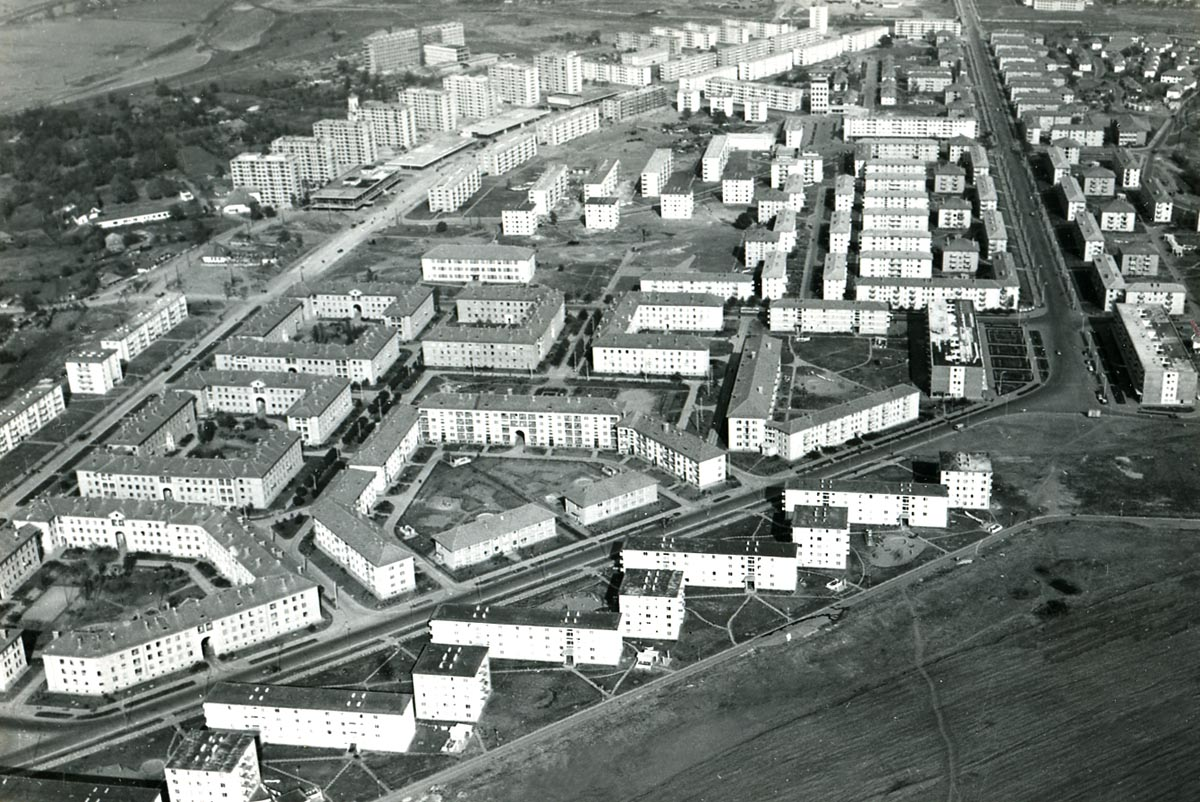
Overview of the new town of Onesti (Gheorghe Gheorghiu-Dej), the quartals I, II, III, IV, V

However, natural elements were not enough to achieve a medium-sized city (40 to 60,000 inhabitants). This is consistent with the French geographer Paul Vidal de La Blache in the sense that "the elements of the site have elements of fixation, whereas those of the situation (geographical position) are factors of progression, of development. The site receives the city, but it is the situation which vivifies it." Vidal's concept was also verified in the case of Onești, the potential regional elements were concentrated in the petrochemical plant: petroleum crude oil from Bacău Region oilfield, sodium chloride from Târgu Ocna mine. The energy base was completed with the methane gas transported through the trans-Carpathian pipeline Nadeș-Oituz Pass.

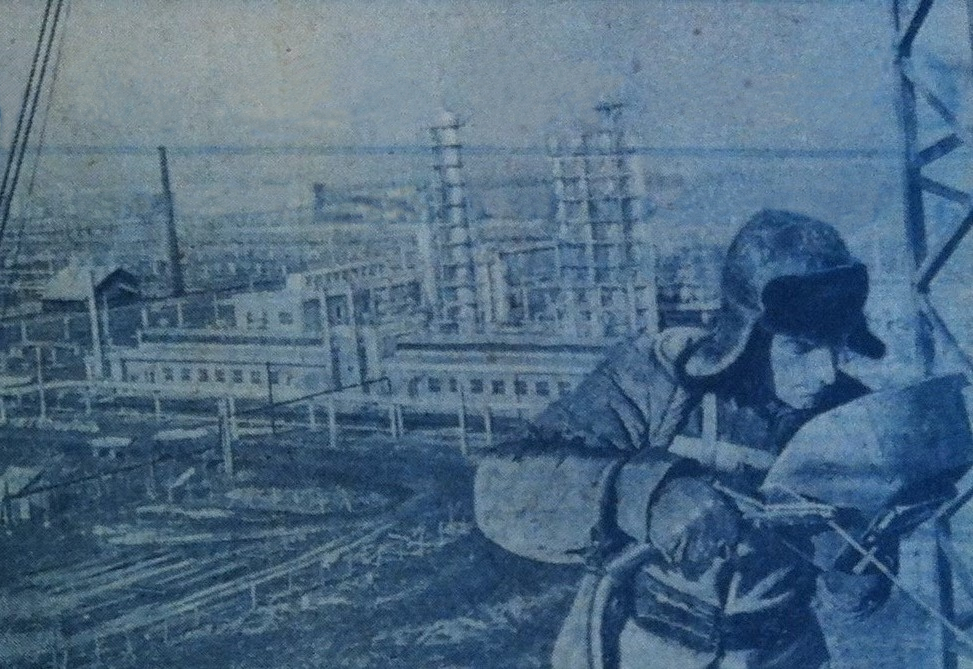
R10 Oil Refinery construction between 1959 and 1960

The location between Onești and Borzești of a large petrochemical industrial complex - approved by H.C.M. (Hotărârea Consiliului de Miniștrii) No. 1638/1952, an integral part of the measures taken by the Romanian Workers' Party for the development of Moldavia, proved to be optimal on technical, economical and social criteria, taking into account the amounts of considerable natural resources in the Trotuș basin. The same decision stipulated the need for the construction of a thermal power plant in Borzeşti, which was to supply the new industrial complex in Onesti with electric and thermal energy. The data in 1951 showed that the electricity demand in Moldova amounted to 1,350 million KWh for the year 1955, that is for 5.6 times more than the entire production of the first year of the 1951-1955 Five-Year Plan.

By the Decision of the Council of Ministers (H.C.M.) No. 1635/1952, it was envisaged that in the Bacău Region, Târgu Ocna Raion, the construction of Borzești Industrial Group and the related proletarian city, Onești. The industrial zone was built northeast of the former village of Borzești, between the railway and the Trotuș River, its surface exceeding that of other parts of the city. As a result of this decision, in 1952, the colonies for construction workers began to be built and then the foundations of the first apartment buildings. At the city and industrial sites have worked alongside construction workers assembled in colonies and common law detainees or political prisoners. Soon the city had the highest number of intellectuals per thousand inhabitants, and the average age was 28 years old.

The petrochemical plant was built in four stages: First stage (1952-1960), comprises the first works from the Borzești Thermal Power Plant (1952), the No. 10 Oil Refinery (by H.C.M .1683/1952), the Rubber Plant (H.C.M. 1498/1957) grouped on 610 ha; (1961-1965), the phenol, acetone equipments (1961), synthetic rubber (1963) and styrene-polystyrene (1964), the industrial platform exceeds 846 ha. In the third stage (1966-1970), works were started at Refinery II and the Poly-isoprenic factory. In the fourth stage, two industrial objectives were put into operation: Synthetic Rubber Plant II and Refinery II. The surface of the platform has exceeded 1000 hectares and includes the city platform based on the food industry, wood processing and others.

At the same time, beginning construction of the electrolytic caustic soda plant (H.C.M. 2068/1954), later became the Borzesti Chemical Plant, whose first capacities were put into operation in 1960, when the salt brought directly from the Târgu Ocna mine or the brine transported through the plants in pipelines began to be transformed into highly demanded products: caustic soda, chlorine, hydrogen.

Between June 18–25, 1962, a Soviet delegation led by Nikita Khrushchev took place in Romania. The Delegation, accompanied by Gheorghe Gheorghiu-Dej, visited the town of Onești and the industrial group. In the same year, between September 15–21, a government delegation of the German Democratic Republic, headed by Walter Ulbricht, visited Romania. It also visited the town of Onesti and the industrial complex. In September 1966 the Industrial Complex and the city were visited by Nicolae Ceaușescu and Ion Gheorghe Maurer.

Installations commissioned in 1960 were: diaphragm electrolysis, liquid chlorine evaporation-melting, lime chloride, sulfuric acid, monochlorobenzene, Detexan and hexachlorane - commissioning continued in 1961 with chlorination plants and methylene chloride. Featuring chlorine in large quantities, this plant becomes one of the largest chlorinated insecticides producers in the country, managing to cover not only the needs of agriculture, but also to provide products for export.

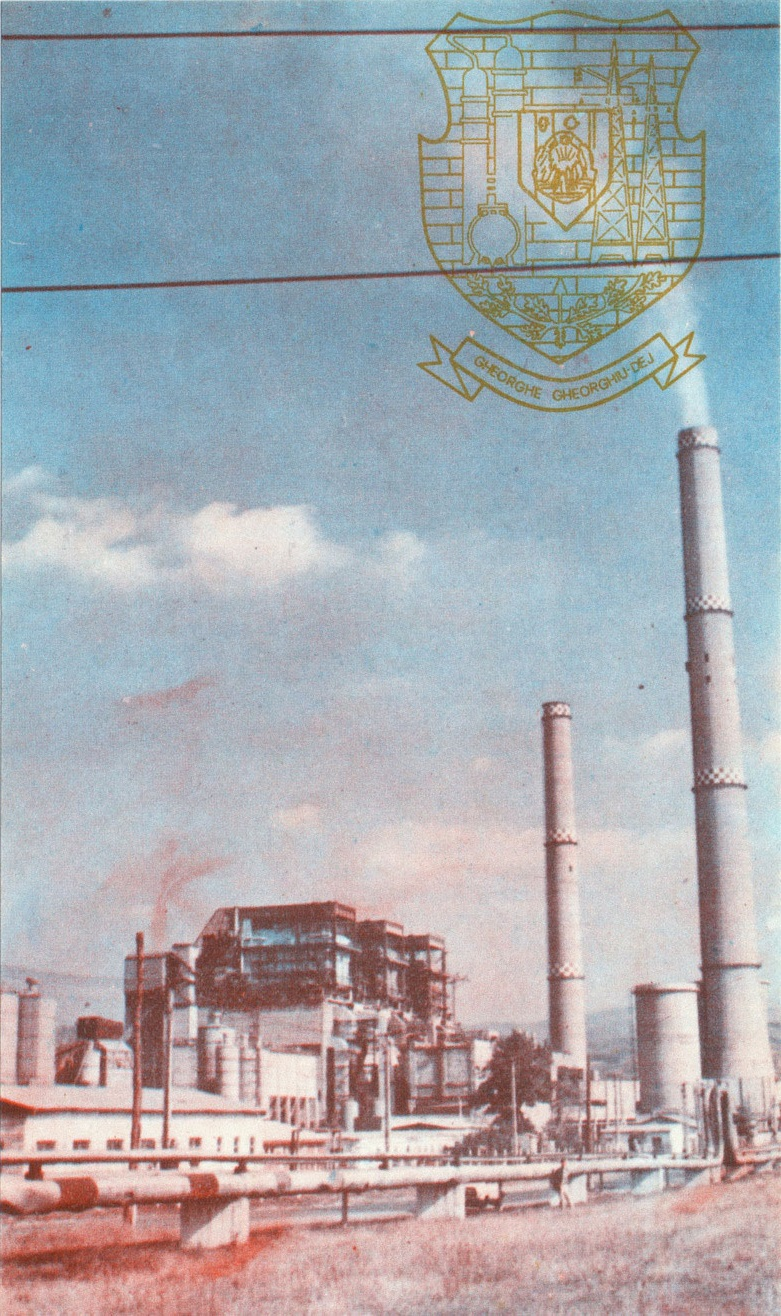
"Gheorghe Gheorghiu-Dej – A fortress of labor", with the Borzești II Power Station photo in the background and imprinted coat of arms of Gheorghe Gheorghiu-Dej city in Socialist Republic of Romania

The operation of the third industrial unit on the current petrochemical complex was carried out in 1962, when the first quantities of Isopropylbenzene, phenol and acetone were produced. For industrial complex and for the national economy, this year was a crucial moment, since the commissioning of the Synthetic Rubber and Petrochemicals Complex has created the premises for a broad economic development for the coming years and a jump in the economic potential of Bacău County. These units continued with new technologies, at the oil refinery the atmospheric and vacuum distillation plants no. 3, thermal cracking, catalytic cracking no. 1 and 2, absorption-fractionation gas, coke calcination, catalytic reforming complex and furfurol gas oil solvent plant, which have created opportunities to capitalize products at a higher level. At the same pace, the electrolytic caustic soda plant increased production. At old plants have been added new ones: fatty alcohols, vinyl compounds, caustic soda. At the rubber plant, new polyisoprene rubber plants were put into operation.

On April 1, 1969, the three factories on the Borzești Industrial Complex merged into the giant "Petrochemical Industrial Group Borzeşti", and in 1973 it became the "Borzeşti Petrochemical Plant", comprising 12,000 of employees, out of which 463 have higher education. In the over 20 years that have passed since the establishment of the first plant, through an organic bonding between technological processes and through superior valorization, it has continuously strengthened its economic power, maintaining itself as the most important industrial unit of Bacău County.

In 1970 the chemical production of the Borzesti Petrochemical Industrial Group accounted for 99.9% of the production of the chemical industry of Bacău County and 8% of the chemical industry of the country.

At the end of 1979, the value of the fixed assets in the endowment amounted to 7860 million lei, resulting in an industrial production of almost 7 billion lei, representing 26% of the entire industrial production of the county. Value production in 1979 was 3.4 times higher than in 1965, when the average annual growth rate was 9.2%. Significant increases were recorded over 1965 in a series all products such as: caustic soda 1.9 times, synthetic rubber 4.7 times, phenol 2.4 times, polystyrene 3.7 times, gasoline 2.3 times, vinyl polychloride 1.4 times, insecticides 1.5 times.

The products manufactured by the petrochemical complex have been exported to more than 40 countries including: The Union of Soviet Socialist Republics, China, Germany, Hungary, Yugoslavia, England, Italy, Spain, France Egypt, Israel, Czechoslovakia, Iran, Japan, Netherlands, Switzerland, Austria, Belgium, India, Poland, Bulgaria, Sweden, Turkey and others.

Between 11 and 14 October 1976, King Baudouin of Belgium, accompanied by Queen Fabiola, visited Romania, among others by visiting the petrochemical complex.
The platform had 12,000 workers in 1980, achieving a productivity of 2.8 times higher than in 1965. The benefits obtained in 1979 by this unit amounted to 520 million lei.

The Petrochemical plant Borzeşti directly influenced the establishment and development of a new city, which became the municipality of Gheorghe Gheorghiu-Dej (Onești), which ensures conditions for the petrochemical workers of Trotuș Valley. The new city is remarkable by the pace of development and specialization, modern architecture and a dynamic influence area. These qualities were synthesized by the French geographer André Blanc - "Gheorghe Gheorghiu-Dej is the brightest example of the creative transformation of the natural environment based on systematic studies in order to raise the economic level of a region that was underdeveloped until short time ago."

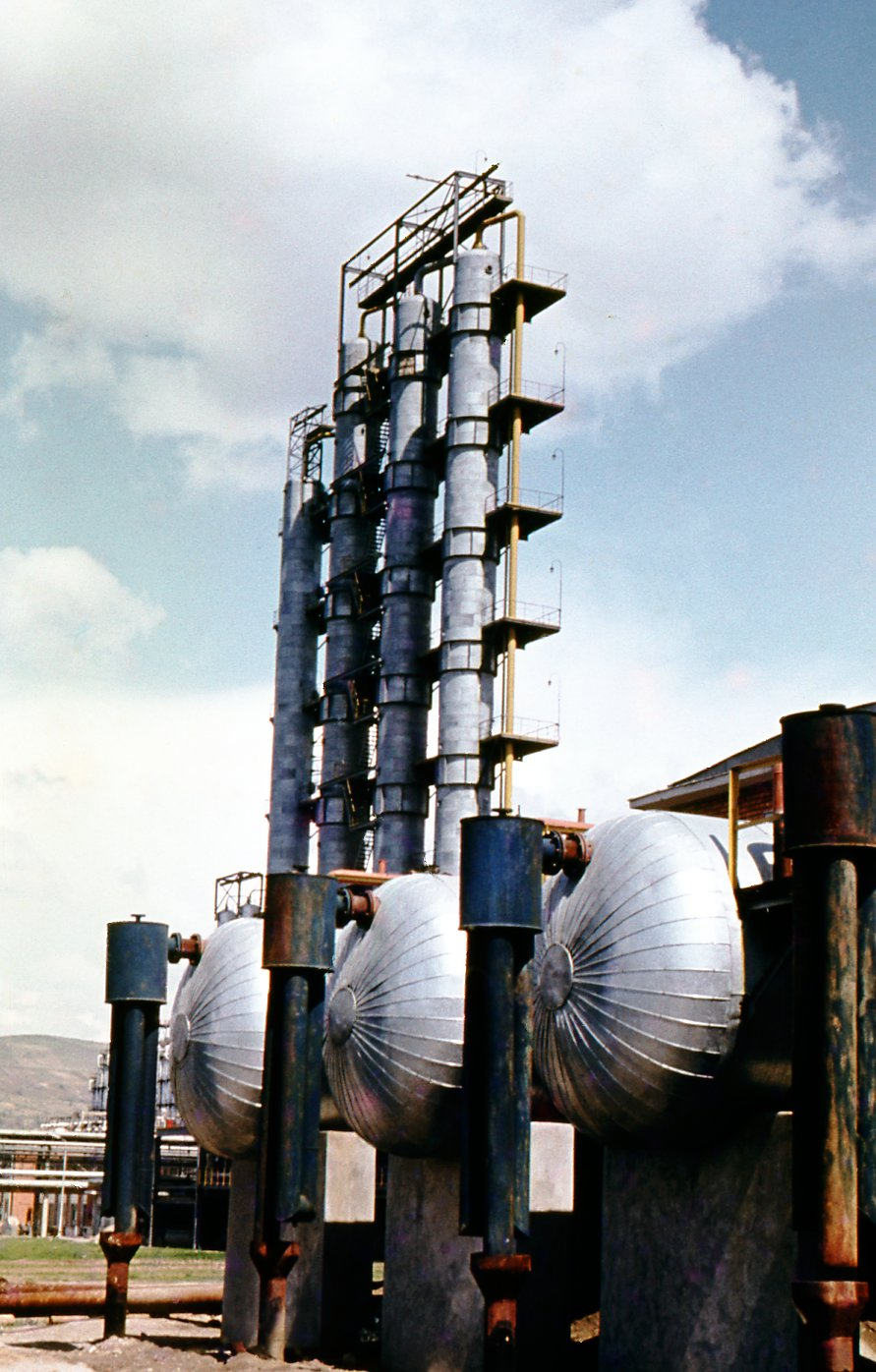
Synthetic Rubber and Petrochemicals Complex

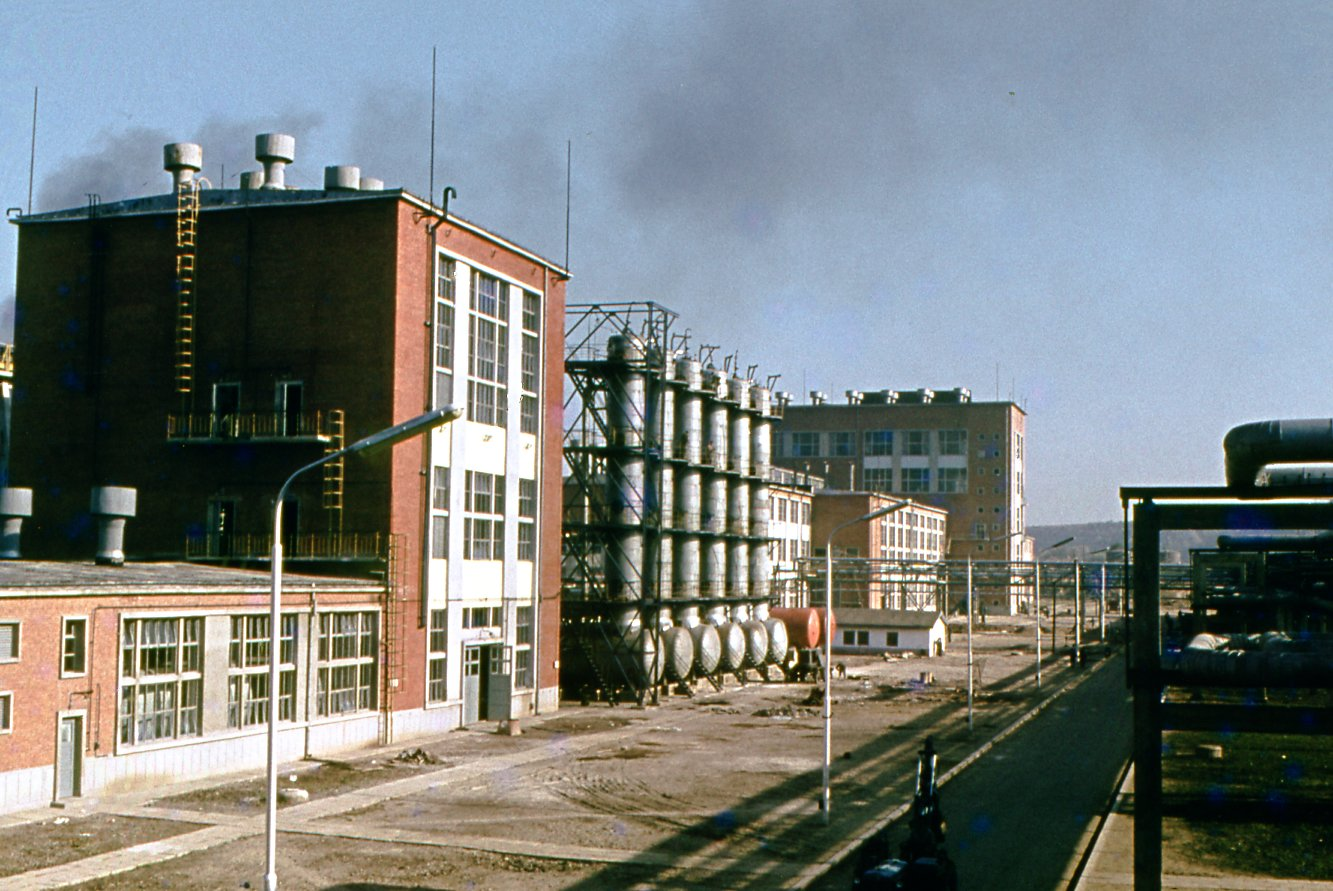
E1 plant

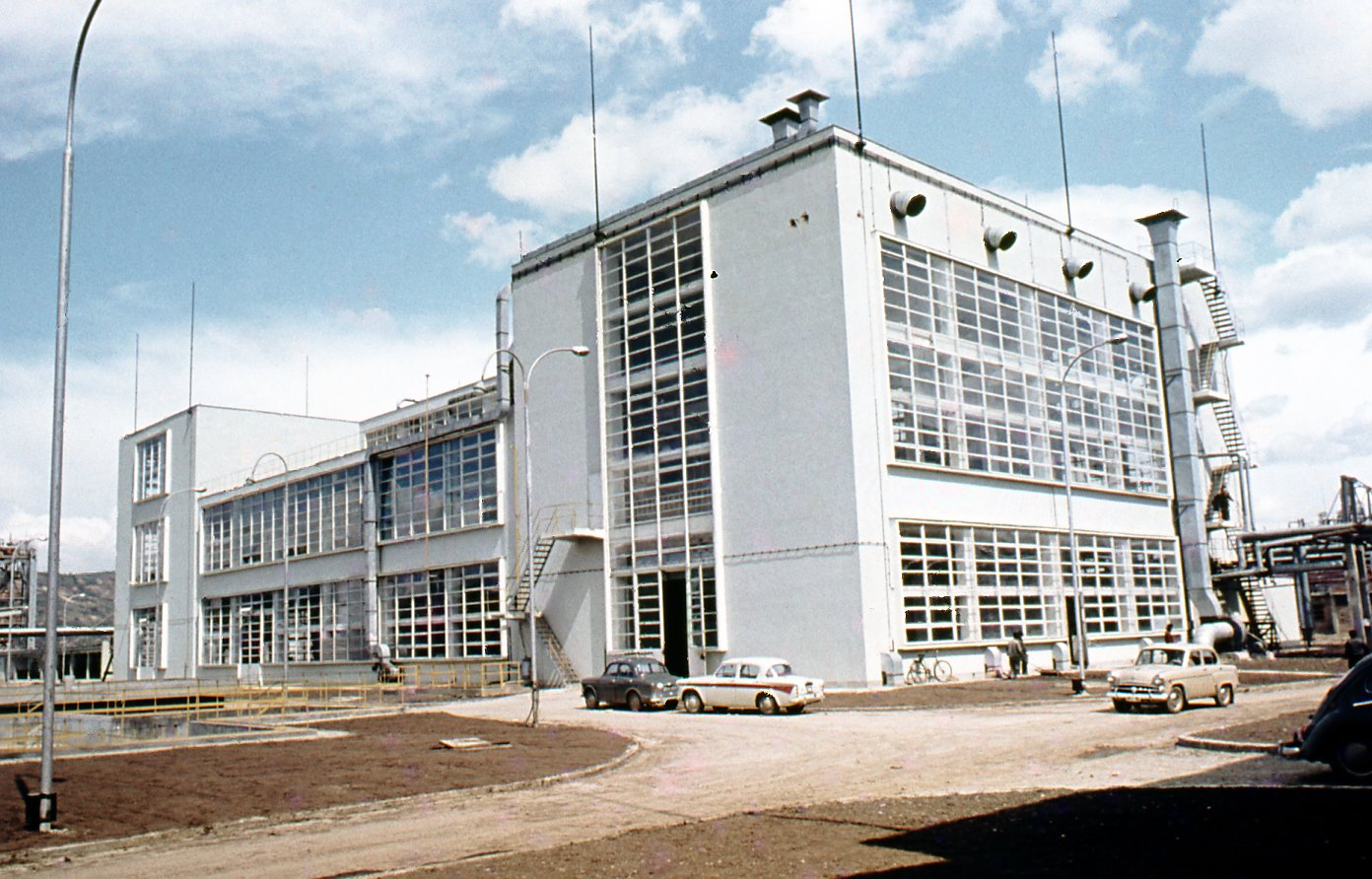
The building of the styrene polymerization reactors

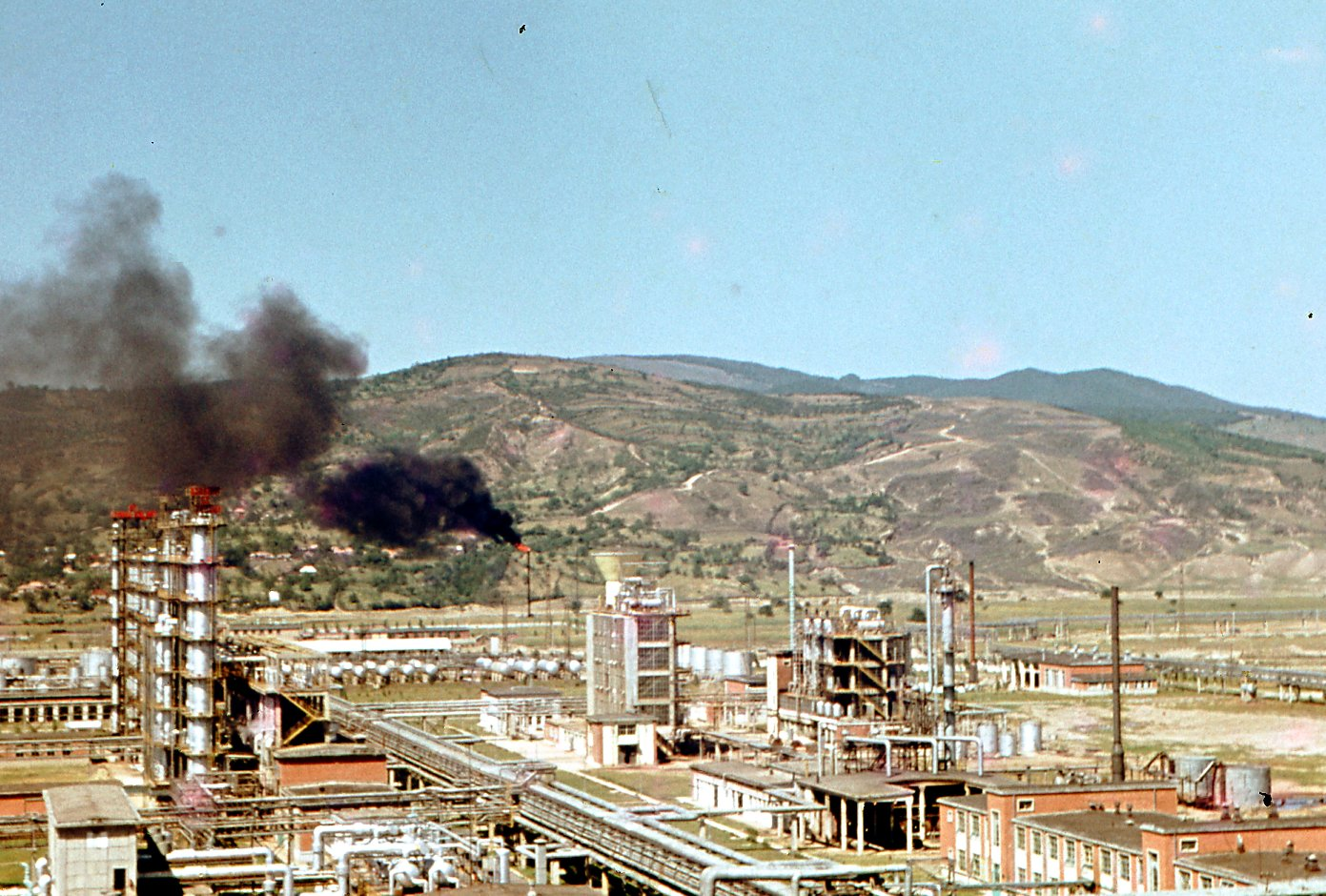
Other equipments
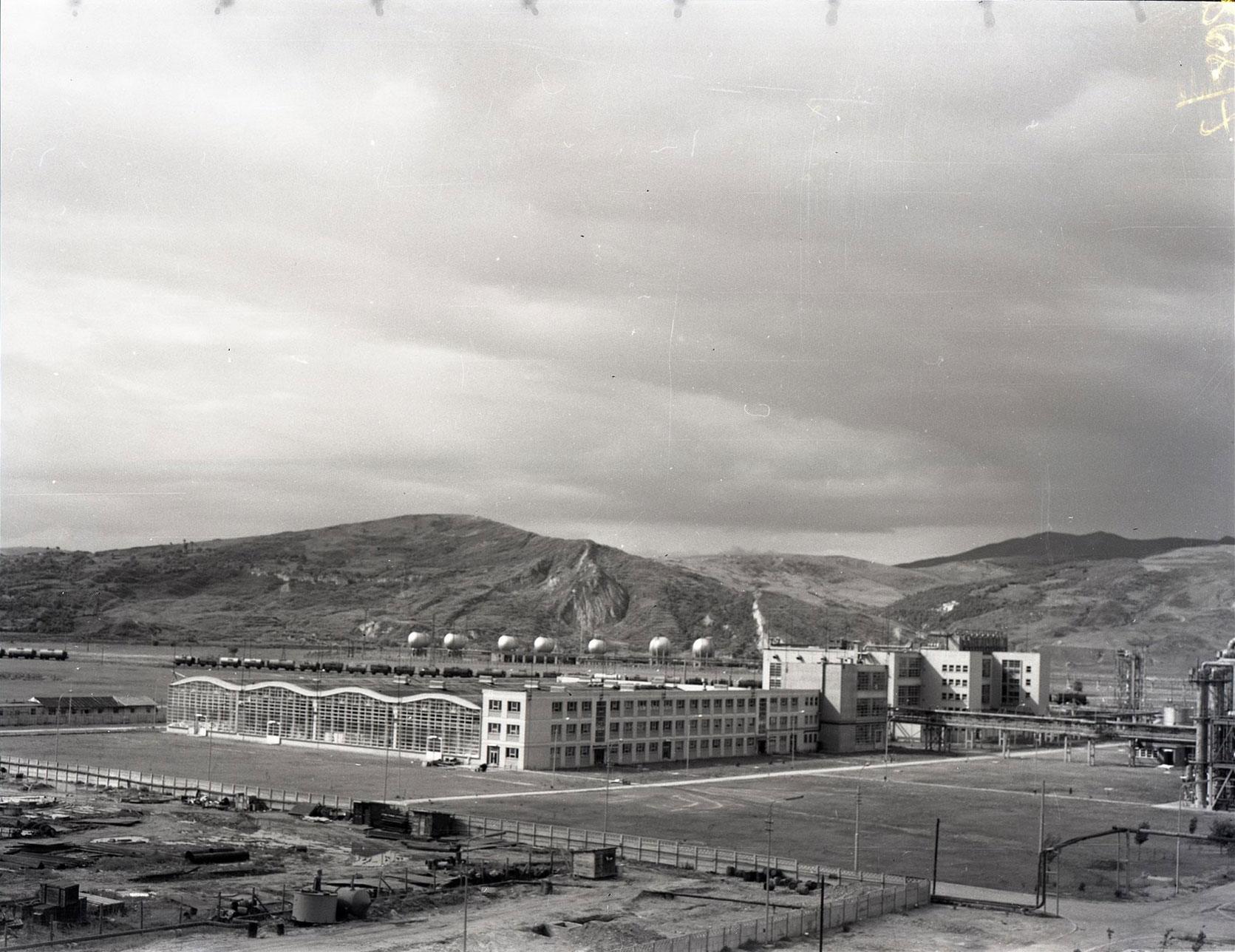
Polystyrene plant

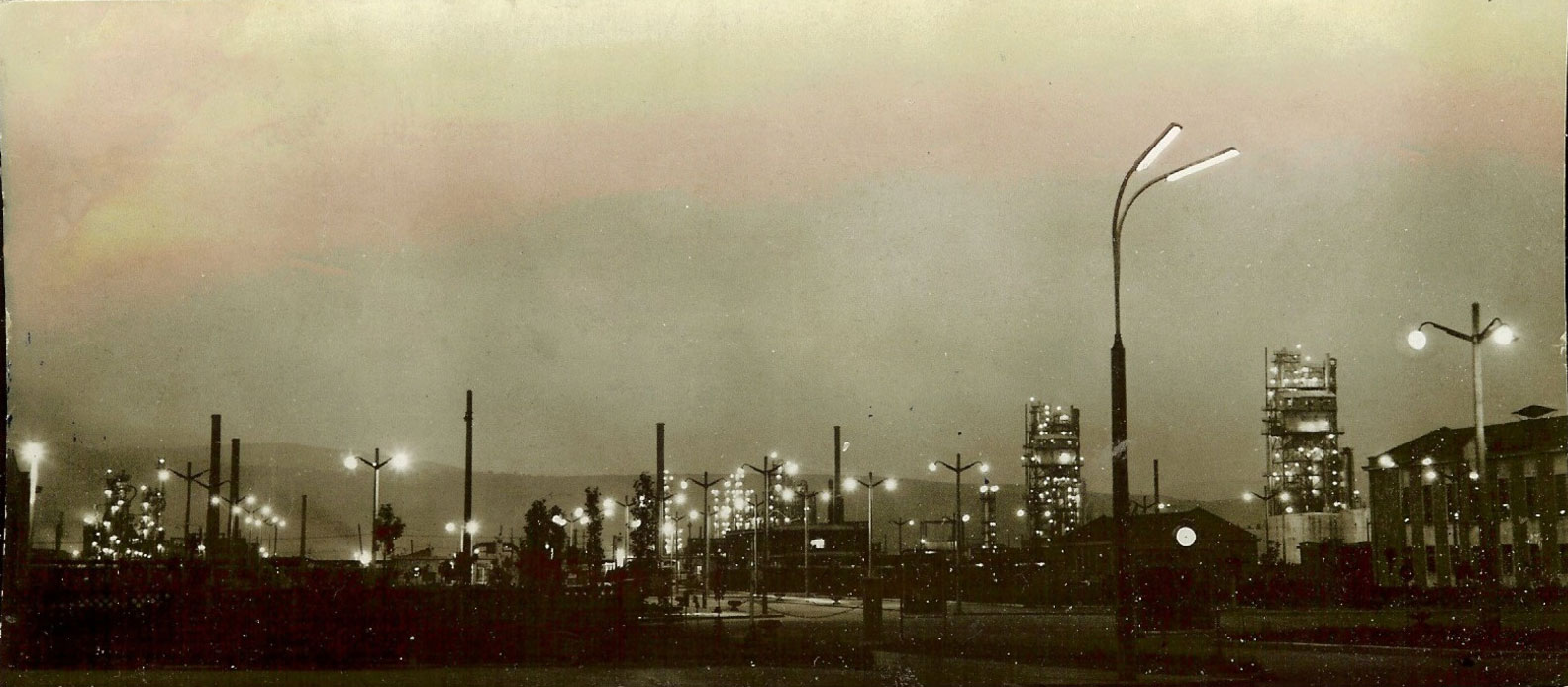
No. 10 Oil Refinery (Gheorghe Gheorghiu-Dej - 1968)

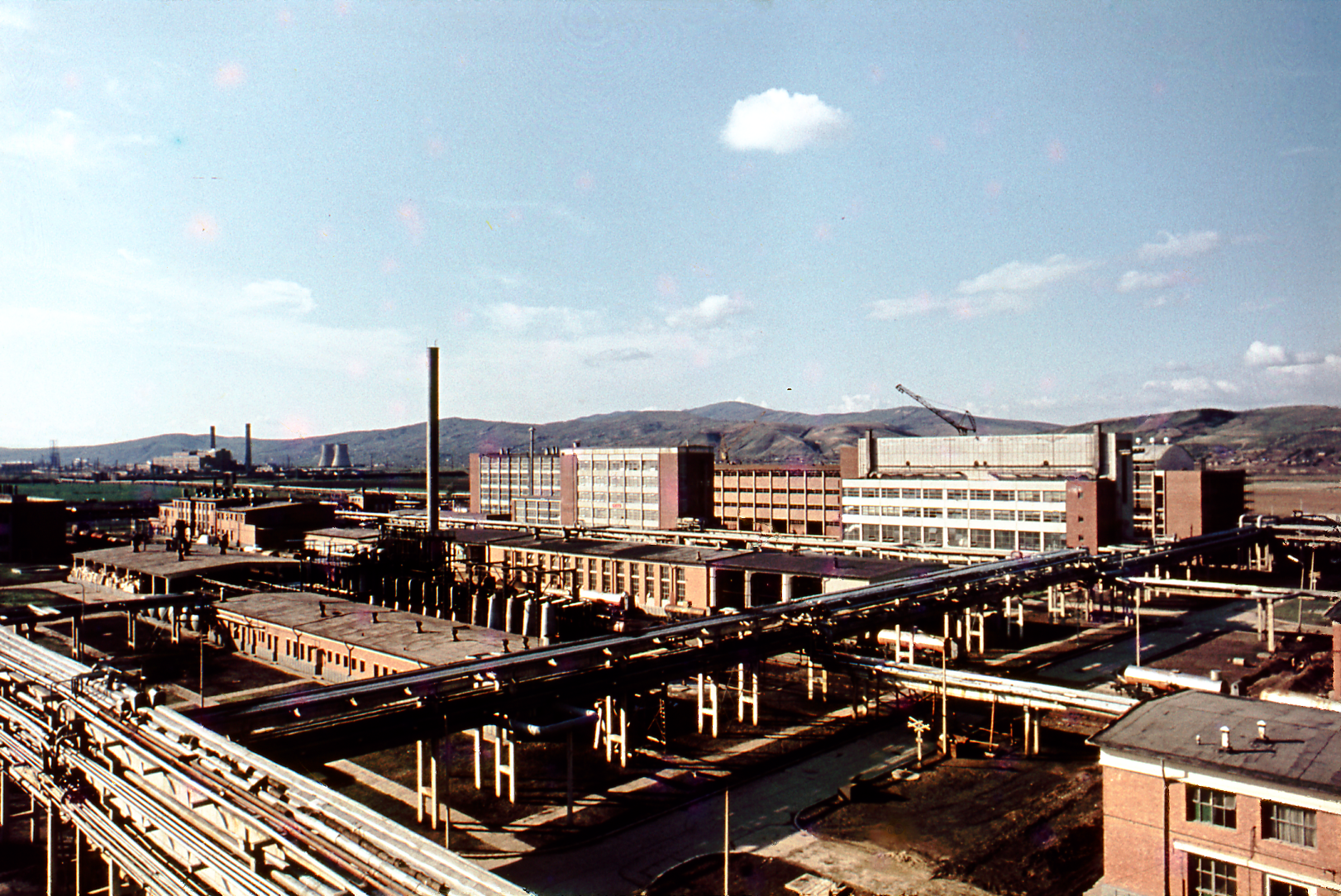
Borzești Chemical Plant and Borzești Power Station

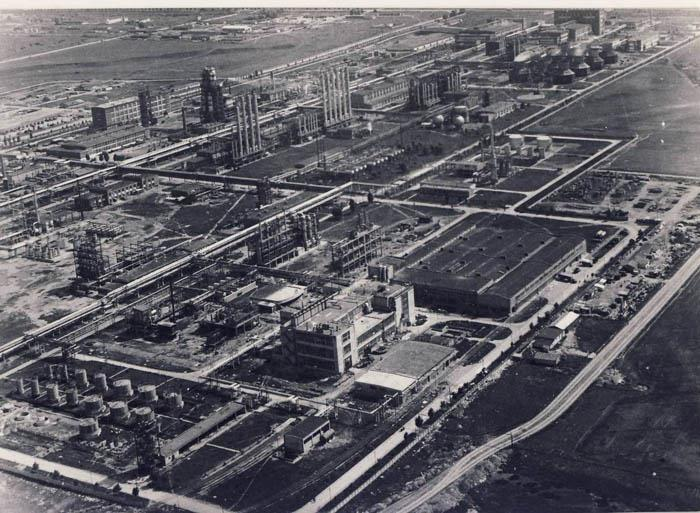
Aerial view of Synthetic Rubber and Petrochemicals Complex

== Industrial structure ==
The Trotuș basin had a natural and human potential corresponding to economic and social transformations. After World War II, oversized industrial construction plans were developed that surpassed regional potential, leading to large investments, difficulties in raw materials supply and distribution of products and, in some cases, pollution of the area. In 1986, the workers of the Onești industry exceeded 22,000 people and the industrial platform reached 1,038 ha. In the first stage of development, the foundations of an energy industry were established.

After 1980 there were significant mutations in the structure of production, in the superior valorization of raw materials in the area. In 1984 over 54% of industrial production was petroleum products, 21,8% synthetic rubber and latex, 5,5% plastics, 4,8% insecticides, fungicides and herbicides for agriculture, 3,7% caustic soda and 9% organic and inorganic chemicals, solvents, chlorinates.

=== Energy industry ===
The Borzești Power Station began building in 1956, when the first 25 MW generator was installed. Until 1966 were completed with 25 MW, in 1957, 50 MW in 1960, 25 MW in 1961, 50 MW in 1962 and 1966. The largest increase in capacity was in 1969 with 2x200 MW, the main fuels being oil and the gas flowing from the Tazlău Valley. The installed power of the thermal plant in 1970 exceeded the installed power of existing generating sets throughout the country in 1938.

The grid generated electricity over the requirements of the industrial complex and the residential city, with production increasing 63.7 times in 1985 compared to 1956, so 110 kV, 220 kV and 400 kV power lines were built for the industrial centers in Moldavia and southeastern Transylvania and the railway networks in the Trotuș, Olt and Siret valleys.

=== Petrochemical industry ===
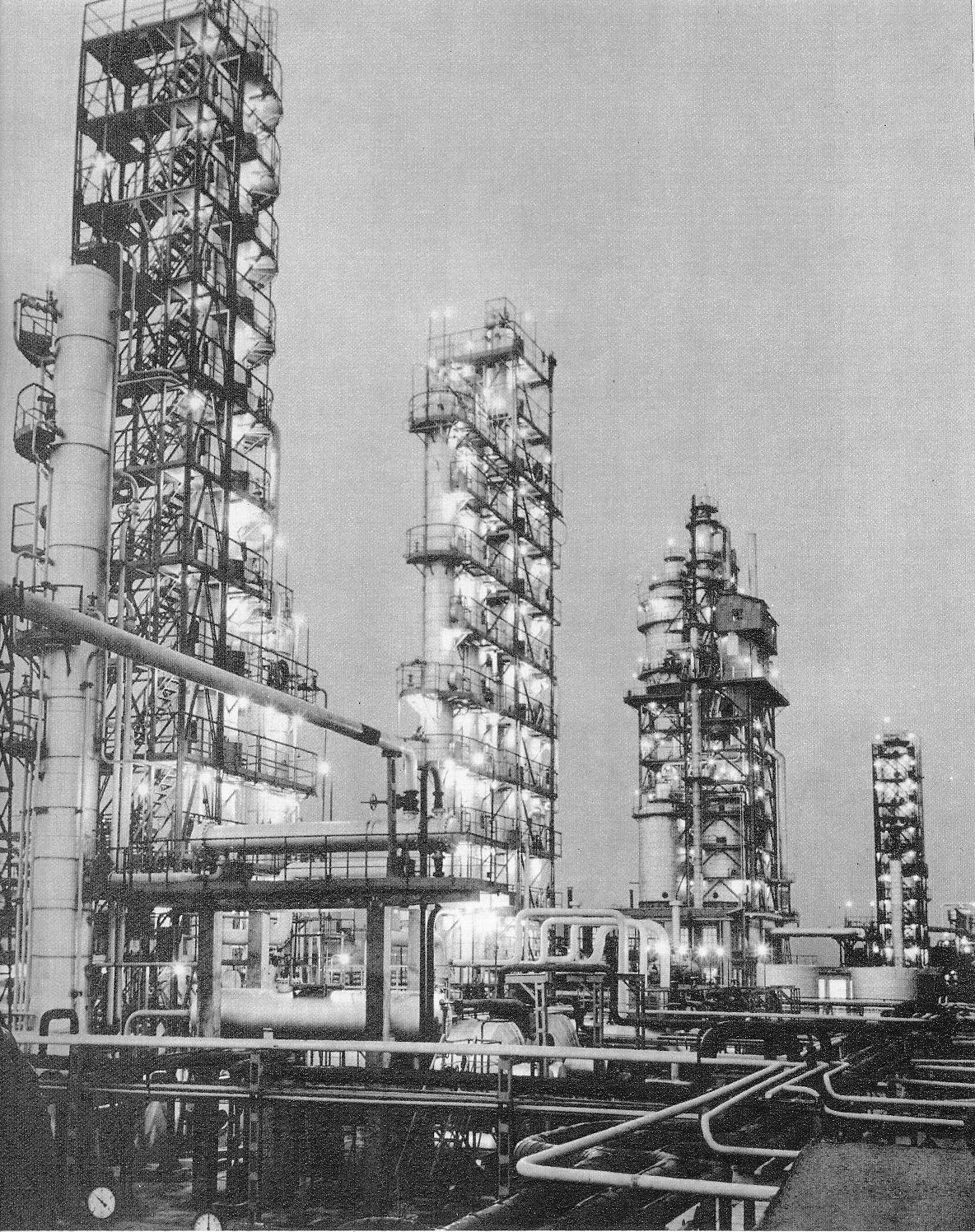
No. 10 Oil Refinery în 1964

The No. 10 Oil Refinery is part of the large refinery category with capacity over 1 million tons. It consists of: Refinery I ("Onești 10") with electrical desalination plants (1957-1960), atmospheric distillation (1961) and Refinery II with gas fraction sections (1980), catalytic reforming (1980) hydrofinishing of gasoline (1980).

The refinery processes oil from Bacău County and some quantities are transferred from refineries in Muntenia or distributed from export. The transport of regional oil and petroleum products is done through pipelines or the railway network. Products include petrol, fuel oil, diesel fuel and derivatives such as benzene, xylene, orthoxylene, ethylbenzene, liquefied gases, and the like.

The Synthetic Rubber and Petrochemicals Complex produced the first quantities of synthetic ethylene-styrene butadiene rubber, being the only enterprise of its kind in the country. The construction took place between 1958 and 1963. Unlike the refinery which primarily processes petroleum into petroleum products (fractions), the rubber plant transforms oil fractions into finished products, such as polystyrene, phenol, acetone, benzene, used in the medicine and paint industry. Since 1976, a second polyisoprene rubber plant has been put into operation and later facilities for the manufacture of latex and butadiene-styrene rubbers.

The synthetic rubber output was 30,820 tonnes in 1965 and 155,909 tonnes in 1985, of which the polyisoprene rubber was 57,079 tonnes in 1985.

In 1970 the fourth line of rubber was put into operation and 70,000 tons of synthetic rubber was produced in that year. The manufactured rubber products were: CAROM 1500: for automotive tires, tractors, scooters, motorcycles, technical articles, conveyor belts, transmission belts and other items requiring good physical properties and good strength. CAROM 1502: for black and colored technical articles, sanitary ware, rubber cloth, carpets. CAROM 1503: for consumer goods, especially footwear. CAROM 1712: for cable and yarn insulation, technical articles, tires and many other applications.

=== Chemical industry ===
The Borzesti Chemical Plant is located in the southeastern part of the industrial platform. It was built between 1956 and 1964 with the following structure: caustic soda plant (1960), toxan plant (1961) and polyvinyl chloride - PVC (1964) plant with acetylene, monomer, polychlorinated vinyl emulsion, vinyl polychloride suspension. Acetylene was obtained from a mixture of methane and propane gas by the arc cracking process developed by Aurel Ionescu (1902-1954). The initial profile included chlorosodic products: caustic soda (sodium hydroxide), hydrochloric acid, aluminum chloride, lime chloride, further diversifying production, adding organic solvents: methyl chloride, methylene chloride, cloroform; plastics: vinyl polychloride, emulsion and suspension, ferric vinyl; fatty alcohols, liquid chlorine, and the like. In addition, installations for the production of ammonium chloride, chlorinated insecticides and others have been put into operation.

The chemical plant participated in the national production in the chemical branch by 14% - 25.6%. The production of caustic soda recorded an increase of 48.7 times in 1980 compared to 1960 and the production of insecticides by 30.6 times.

=== Machine building industry ===
Borzești Chemical Equipment Company was established between 1973 and 1976, in the following years, manufacturing products such as: technological equipment for chemical, petrochemical, crude, pulp and paper processing; metal structures and mounting elements. The raw materials used were purchased mainly from the Galați Steel Works, Roman Steel Pipes Works, "Republica" Bucharest Steel Pipes Works.

In 1980, I.U.C. Borzești was the only manufacturer of equipment for pilot plants in the chemical industry in the country. In the same year export activity started in countries such as: Soviet Union, Bulgaria, Austria and Germany.

== Sources ==
- Dr. Pintilie Rusu (coordinator); Stelian Nanianu, Nicolae Barabaș, Ioan Mirea, Dumitru Zaharia, Gheorghe Bucur, Vasile Florea (contributors); Județele Patriei – Județul Bacău, Ed. Sport-Turism, București (1980), pp. 158–160
- Rozalia și Teodor Verde; Monografia Municipiului Onești – în date și evenimente, July 2003, pp. 44–47
- Șandru Ioan, Toma V. Constantin, Aur Nicu; Orașele Trotușene – Studiu de geografie umană II, Întreprinderea Poligrafică Bacău (1989), pp. 190–197, 208
