= RAFO Onești =

Oil refinery in Romania

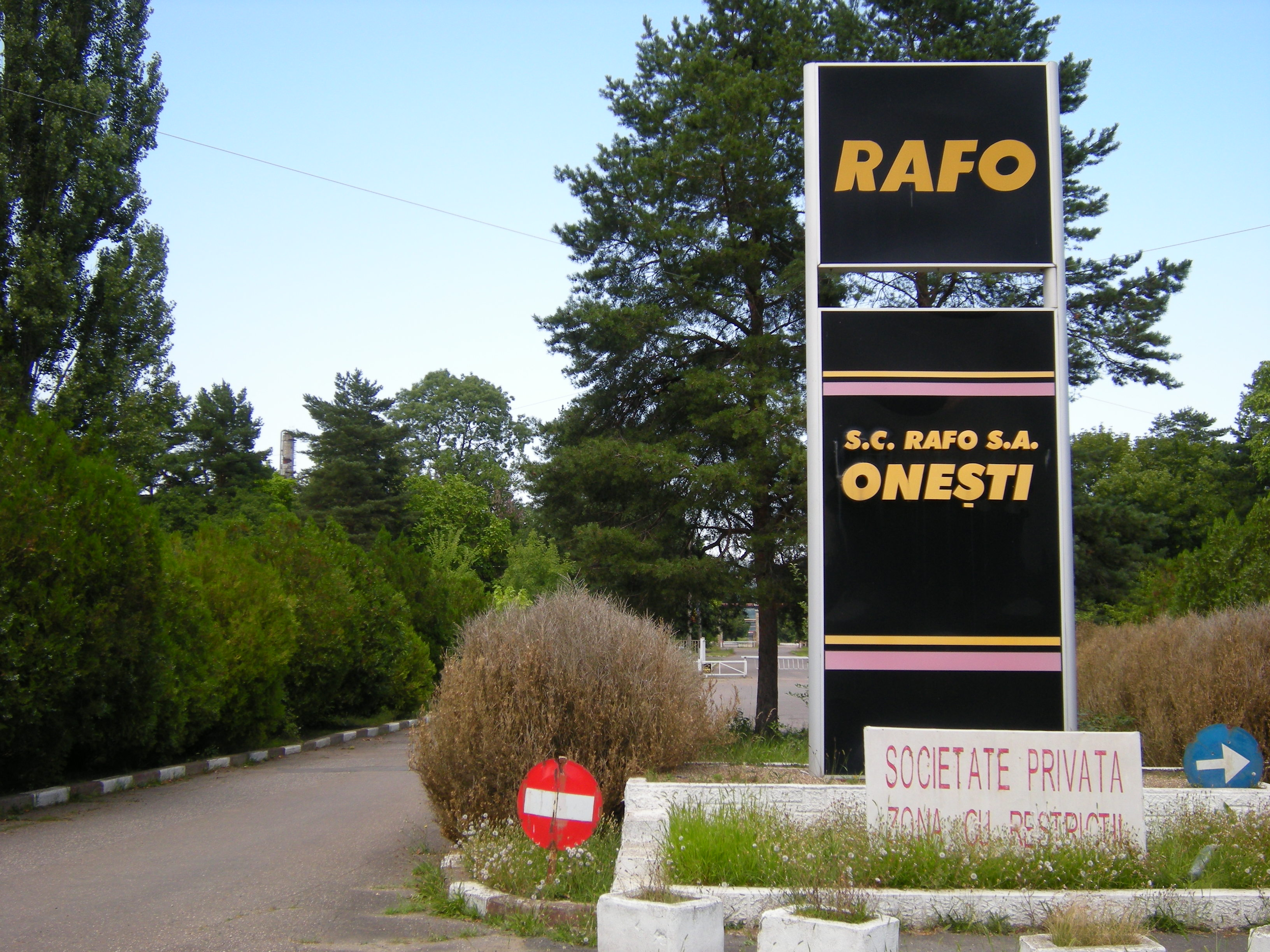
- Company type: Public
- Traded as: BVB: RAF
- Industry: Oil refining
- Founded: 1956
- Defunct: 2019
- Headquarters: Oneşti, Romania
- Key people: Marin Anton, CEO; Iakov Goldovskiy
- Products: Oil products
- Revenue: US$482 million (2007)
- Number of employees: 2,600 (2007)
- Website: www.rafo.ro

RAFO Oneşti was one of the largest oil refineries in Romania and Eastern Europe with an annual total refining capacity of 3.5 million tonnes of oil.

The refinery was privatised in 2001 with the major stock of 60% being sold to Imperial Oil and Canyon Servicos for around US$7.5 million. The British company Balkan Petroleum bought the refinery from those companies in 2003.

In November 2006, Calder - A bought the refinery and paid all its debts to the state budget. Until November 2007 the company paid debts worth around US$380 million, and increased the capital by US$860 million.

The company also operated a chain of 290 gas stations, of which it owned 45, the rest being business associations.

In 2007, Iakov Goldovskiy's Petrochemical Holding GmbH acquired 98% of the company's shares, later the debts of RAFO were swapped for equity. As a result, Petrochemical Holding GmbH became 96.5% shareholder of RAFO.

In 2008, the company stopped production, because it was no longer possible to renew its operating licence, as the facility could not comply with environmental legislation requirements. It entered insolvency in 2014 and in September 2019 it went bankrupt after the plan for its restructuring failed.

The majority shareholder, Petrochemical Holding, registered in Austria and owned by Russian investor Iakov Goldovski is owed around €71 million. The refinery was placed on the market before being sold to Romanian railway transport group Grampet for EUR 6 million for use as a logistics hub.

== See also ==
- Borzești Petrochemical Plant
