= Goldovsky =

Goldovsky or Goldovskiy is a surname. Notable people with the surname include:

- Boris Goldovsky, American conductor
- Onissim Goldovsky (1865–1922), Russian lawyer and activist
- Iakov Goldovskiy (born 1962), Russian petrochemical sector founder

== See also ==
- Goldovsky Opera Theater
