= Târgu Ocna mine =

Salt mine in Romania

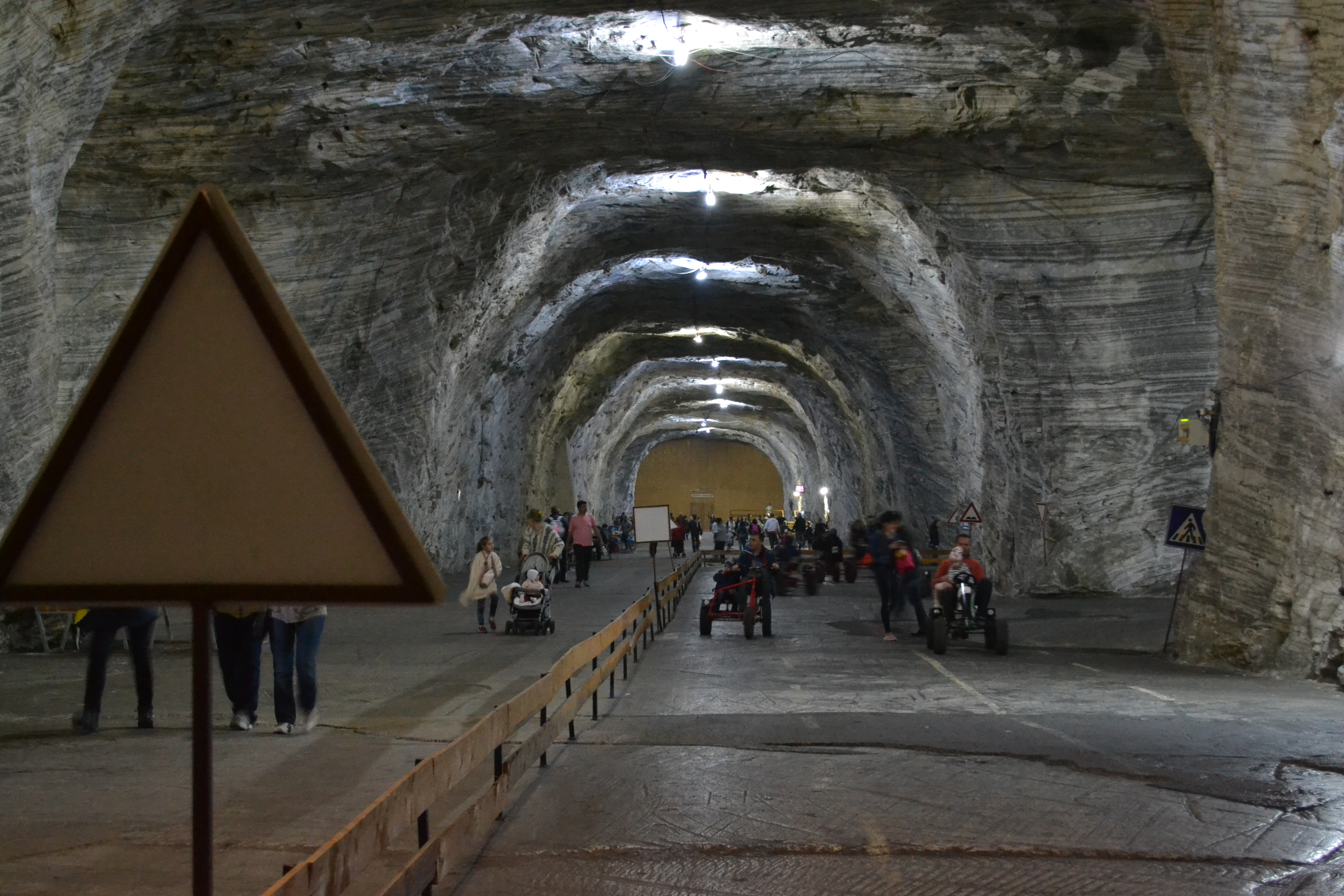
- Interactive map of Târgu Ocna mine
- Location: Târgu Ocna, Bacău County, Romania; 46.2865°N 26.6031°E
- Products: Sodium chloride
- Company: Salrom

The Târgu Ocna mine is a large salt mine located in eastern Romania in Bacău County, close to Târgu Ocna. Târgu Ocna represents one of the largest salt reserves in Romania having estimated reserves of 229 million tonnes of NaCl.
