= Borzești Power Station =

Thermal power plant in Borzeşti, Romania

Borzeşti Power Station
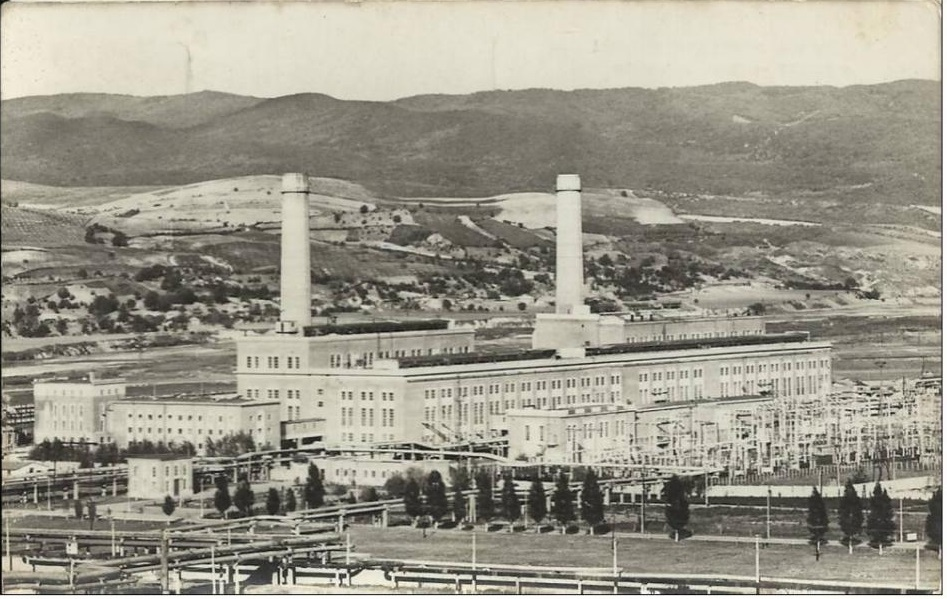
- Panorama of Borzești Power Station
- Country: Romania
- Location: Borzeşti
- Coordinates: 46°15′30″N 26°46′10″E
- Status: Operational
- Owner: Termoelectrica

Thermal power station
- Primary fuel: Natural gas and coal

Power generation
- Units operational: 7
- Nameplate capacity: 655 MW

External links
- Website: www.termoelectrica.ro/newweb/termo/?page_id=610

The Borzeşti Power Station is a large thermal power plant in Borzeşti, Romania, containing seven generation groups, three of 25 MW, two of 50 MW, one of 60 MW and one of 210 MW, having a total electricity generation capacity of 655 MW.

== See also ==
- Borzești Petrochemical Plant
