= Iakov Goldovskiy =

Russian petrochemical sector founder (born 1962)

- Яків Ігорович Голдовський
- Born: February 26, 1962 (age 64); Kryvyi Rih, Dnipropetrovsk region, Ukrainian SSR, Soviet Union
- Occupation: Businessman
- Known for: Founder of Petrochemical Holding

Iakov Goldovskiy (born February 26, 1962) is an Austrian businessman and founder of Petrochemical Holding. He is the founder and president of the petrochemical company Sibur, founder of Rosetto GmbH, ZAO Gazoneftekhimicheskaya Kompaniya (GNK), and other enterprises.

== Career ==
He founded the trading house Grand Business with branch offices both in Russia and in the CIS countries. This network was engaged in manufacturing, procurements and export-import operations, beginning with rawhide and timber and ending with a wide range of consumer goods in Russia. In 1999 Goldovskiy became president of Sibur after the company acquired the state's stakes.

Following a dispute with Gazprom in 2000–2001, he was arrested in January 2002. The charges against him included embezzlement and abuse of office. He was convicted of abuse of authority and released after serving seven months in pre-trial detention. All other charges were dropped.

In 2004, he purchased, among other assets, Korund, a distressed chemical plant, in Dzerzhinsk, Nizhni Novgorod region, Russia. The industrial site was later used for the construction of a facility utilizing modern technology for the production of sodium cyanide used in the gold extraction industry, with a production capacity of 80,000 tons per year. In 2019, he acquired 75% of First Oil from GEM Capital, Cyprus and exited Russian projects in 2022. He currently focuses on ventures in the MENA region, including a sodium cyanide production complex in Alexandria, Egypt, in partnership with Draslovka Holding. The project is being implemented with the participation of the Egyptian authorities, and the industrial site has been designated as part of a free economic zone.

== Personal life ==
Since 1991, he has been living with his family in Vienna (Austria).
