= Borzești Church =

Orthodox church located in Onești, Bacău County, Romania

Coordinates: 46°14′28″N 26°49′04″E

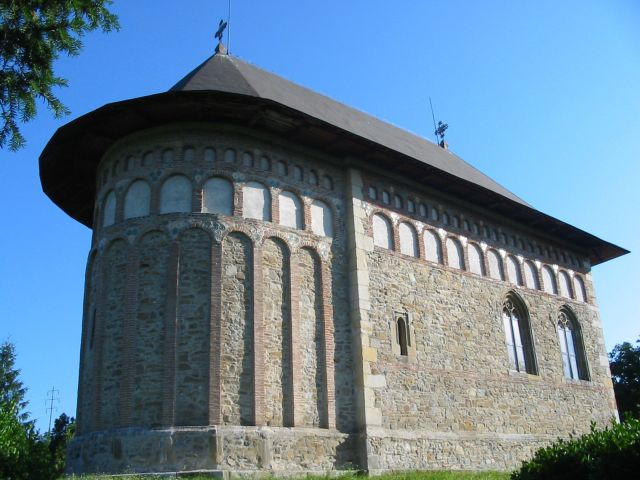

The Borzeşti Church (also known as The Church of the "Assumption of Virgin Mary" in Borzești) is an Orthodox church located in Onești, Bacău County, Romania. It was founded by Ştefan cel Mare (Stephen the Great), with construction lasting from July 9, 1493, to October 12, 1494. Ştefan cel Mare founded the church with his first-born son Alexandru, and the church was dedicated to the Assumption of the Virgin Mary. The church is said to also be in memory of a childhood friend of Ştefan killed during the invasions of the Tatars. Legends say that the friend died under an oak tree where the church now stands.

== Architecture ==
The church is designed in a mix of Moldavian, Gothic, and Byzantine styles. The buildings plan is rectangular with one rounded side, vaulted with four spherical domes, and lacks a spire. The domes are Byzantine inspired and lay on Moldavian arches. The façades contain brick, stone, glazed ceramics, and are decorated with niches. Brick belts surround the building from top to bottom. The church is built mostly out of river stone and bricks and resembles other churches of its time. The church has one door which points to the southwest. The door and the windows were carved in a gothic style. The churches mainly Moldavian style resembles that of the Războieni Monastery and the Piatra Neamţ Church. The walls of the church are covered in murals, and they were restored in 2004.
