= Borzești II Power Station =

Borzeşti II Power Station
- Country: Romania
- Location: Borzeşti
- Status: Operational
- Owner: Termoelectrica

Thermal power station
- Primary fuel: Natural gas and coal

Power generation
- Units operational: 5
- Nameplate capacity: 250 MW

The Borzeşti II Power Station is a large thermal power plant located in Borzeşti, having 5 generation groups of 50 MW each having a total electricity generation capacity of 250 MW.
