= Coleophora pseudodianthi =

Scientific classification
- Kingdom: Animalia
- Phylum: Arthropoda
- Clade: Pancrustacea
- Class: Insecta
- Order: Lepidoptera
- Family: Coleophoridae
- Genus: Coleophora
- Species: C. pseudodianthi

Binomial name
- Coleophora pseudodianthi Baldizzone & Tabell, 2006

Species of moth

Coleophora pseudodianthi is a moth of the family Coleophoridae. It is found in central Bulgaria and southern Ukraine.

The wingspan is 14–18 mm. Adults have been recorded in May in Ukraine and in June in Bulgaria.

The larvae probably feed on Dianthus species.
