= Caryophyllus =

Caryophyllus is an archaic, no longer used name of two unrelated plant genera:

- Syzygium, in the family Myrtaceae
- Dianthus, in the family Caryophyllaceae
