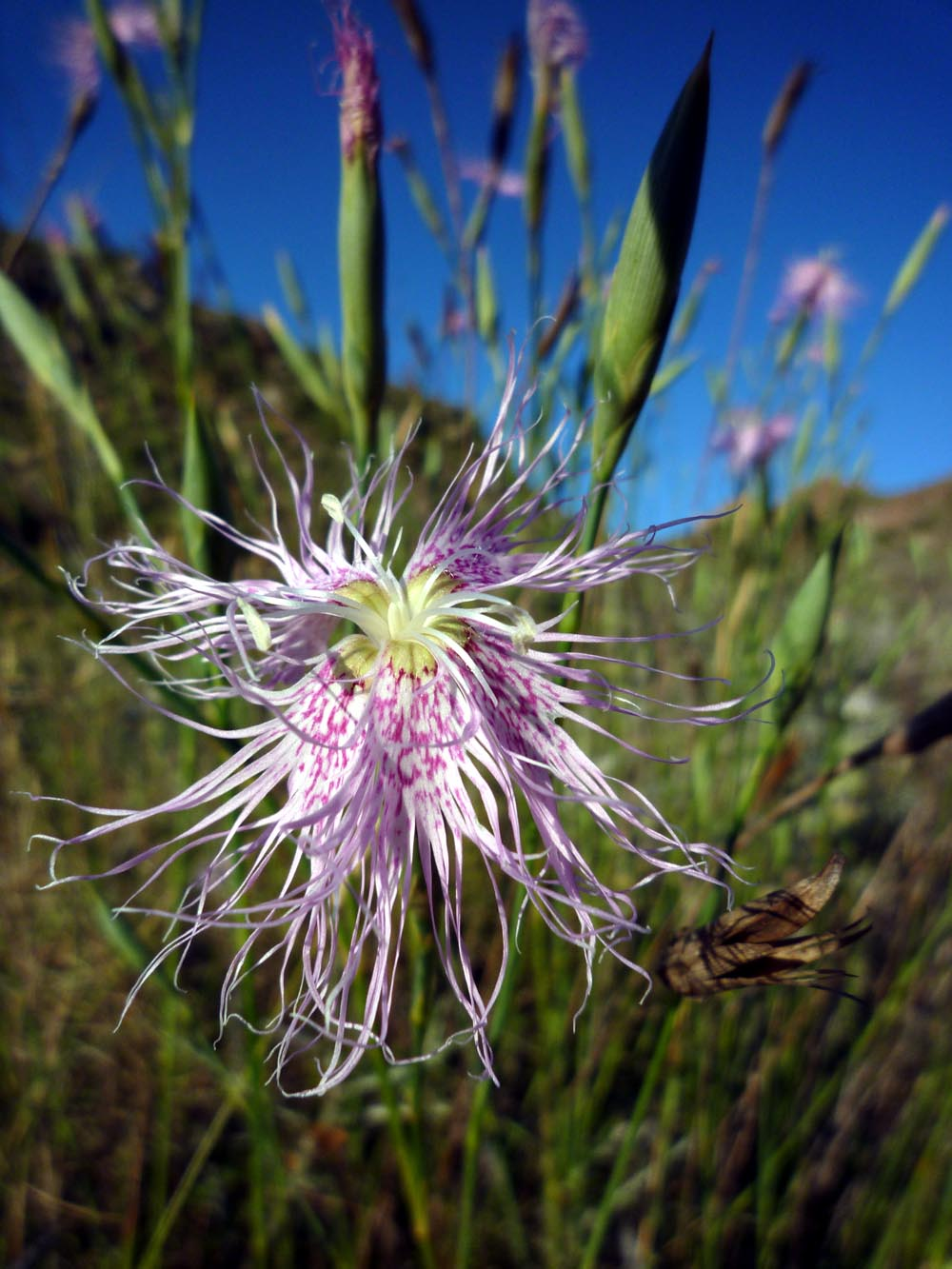

Scientific classification
- Kingdom: Plantae
- Clade: Tracheophytes
- Clade: Angiosperms
- Clade: Eudicots
- Order: Caryophyllales
- Family: Caryophyllaceae
- Genus: Dianthus
- Species: D. broteri

Binomial name
- Dianthus broteri Boiss. & Reut.

Synonyms
- List: Dianthus absconditus Fern.Casas; Dianthus broteri subsp. subbaeticus (Fern.Casas) Fern.Casas, M.Laínz & Muñoz Garm.; Dianthus serrulatus subsp. barbatus (Boiss.) Greuter & Burdet; Dianthus subbaeticus Fern.Casas; Dianthus valentinus Willk.

= Dianthus broteri =

Species of flowering plant

Dianthus broteri is a species of flowering plant in the carnation family Caryophyllaceae. It is native to Portugal and Spain, preferring to grow close to the coasts. Dianthus broteri is a complex of polyploid races, with 2n=2x=30, 2n=4x=60, 2n=6x=90 and 2n=12x=180 chromosomes detected in different populations, the largest polyploid series in the genus.
