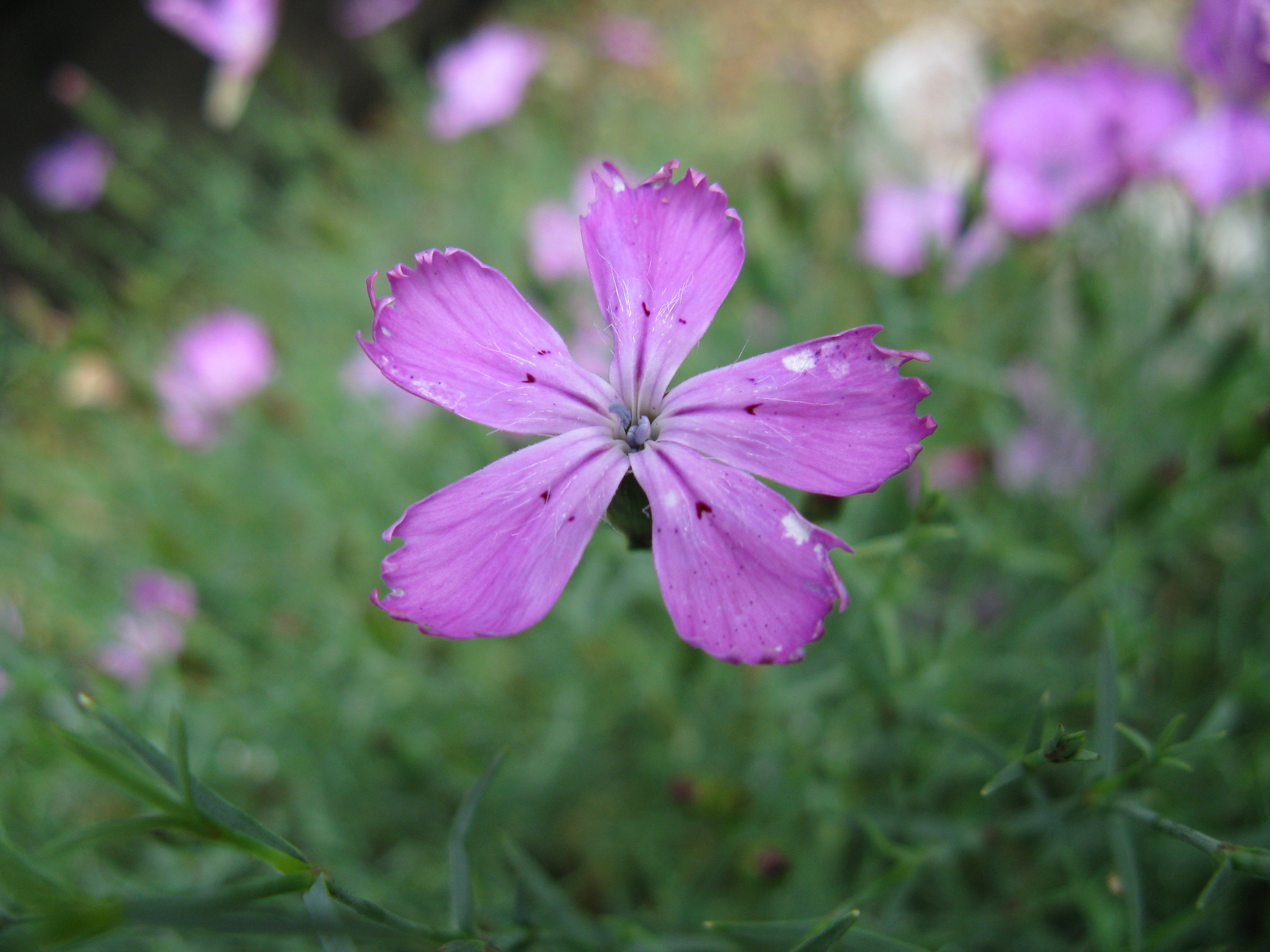

Scientific classification
- Kingdom: Plantae
- Clade: Tracheophytes
- Clade: Angiosperms
- Clade: Eudicots
- Order: Caryophyllales
- Family: Caryophyllaceae
- Genus: Dianthus
- Species: D. nardiformis

Binomial name
- Dianthus nardiformis Janka

= Dianthus nardiformis =

Species of flowering plant

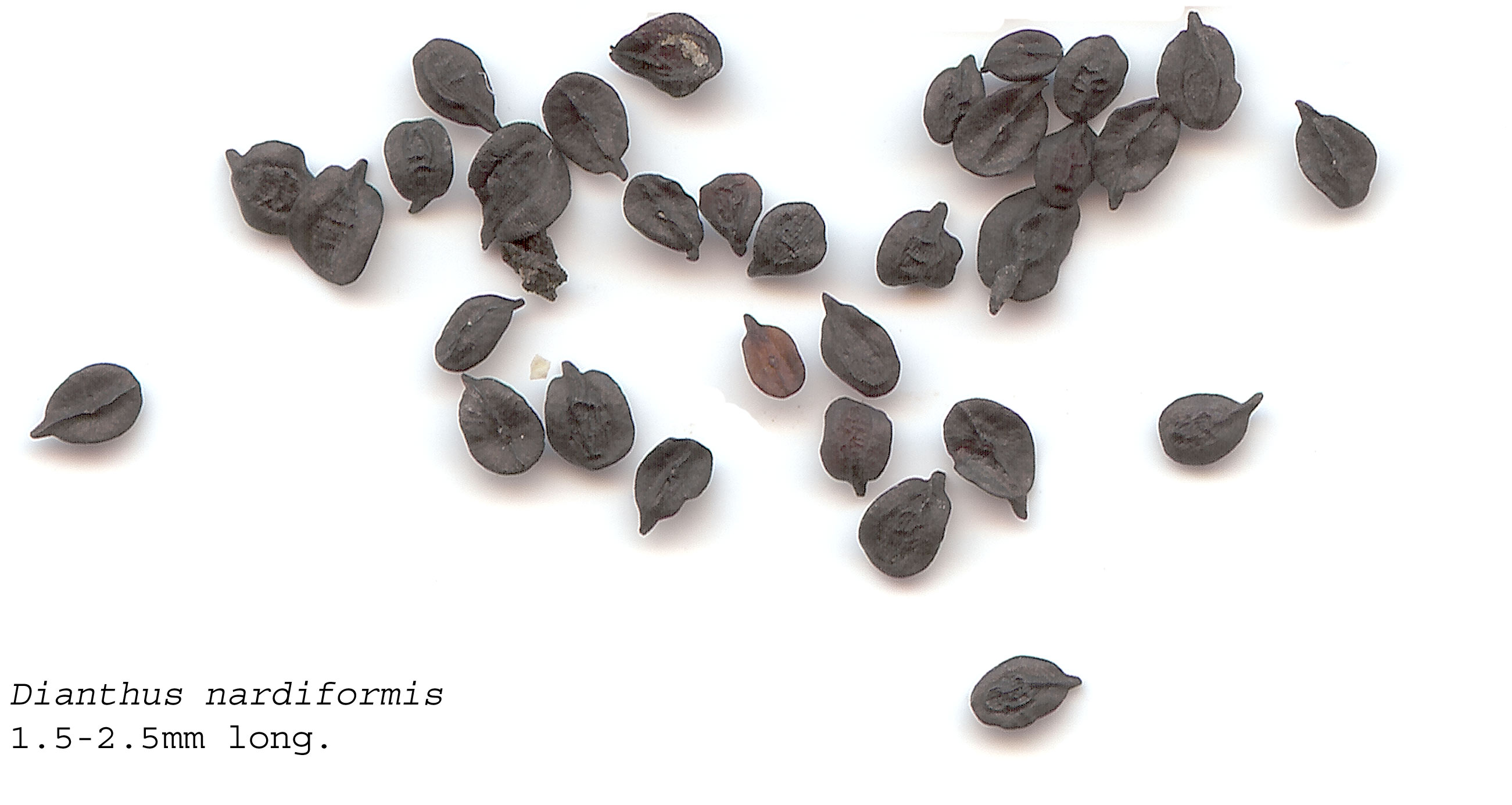
Seeds

Dianthus nardiformis is a species of herbaceous perennial plant in the genus Dianthus. It is endemic to the Carpathian Mountains.
