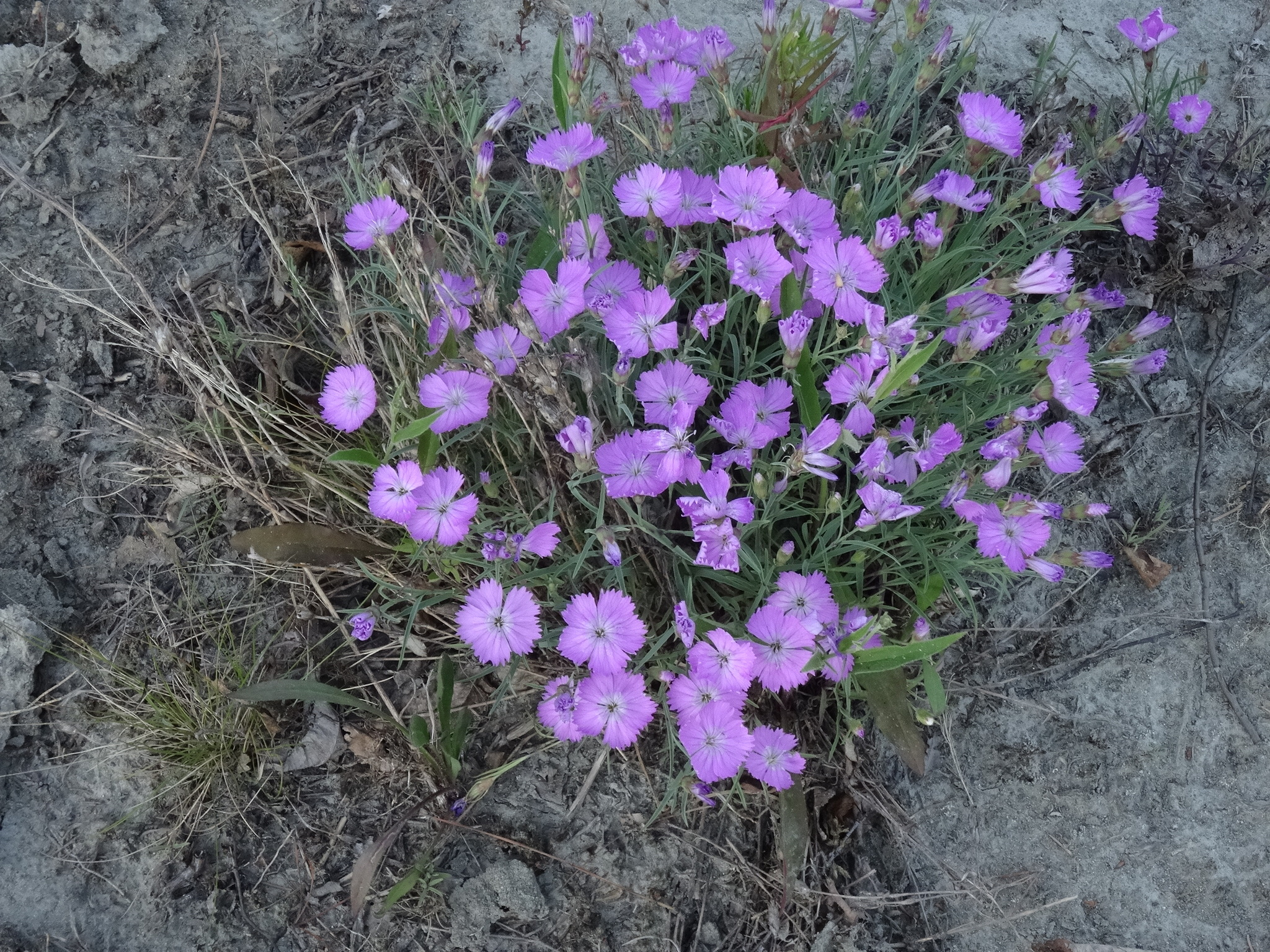

Conservation status
- Apparently Secure (NatureServe)

Scientific classification
- Kingdom: Plantae
- Clade: Tracheophytes
- Clade: Angiosperms
- Clade: Eudicots
- Order: Caryophyllales
- Family: Caryophyllaceae
- Genus: Dianthus
- Species: D. repens

Binomial name
- Dianthus repens Willd.

Synonyms
- Dianthus alpinus subsp. repens (Willd.) Kozhevn.; Dianthus chinensis subsp. repens (Willd.) Vorosch.; Dianthus repens var. scabripilosus Y.Z.Zhao

= Dianthus repens =

Species of plant

Dianthus repens, common names boreal carnation and northern pink, is a plant species native to the Nei Mongol (Inner Mongolia) region of China, as well as to Siberia, the Russian Far East, northern parts of European Russia (Komi, Arkhangelsk, etc.), Alaska and Yukon Territory.

Dianthus repens is a perennial herb with many stems clumped together, sometimes erect but other times forming a mat pressed against the ground. Stems are hairless (except in some Chinese populations), up to 25 cm (9.8 in) long. Leaves are linear or narrowly lanceolate, up to 5 cm (2.0 in) long. Flowers are usually solitary but sometimes in clumps of 2-4, with pink to purple petals. It grows in rock outcrops and talus slopes.
