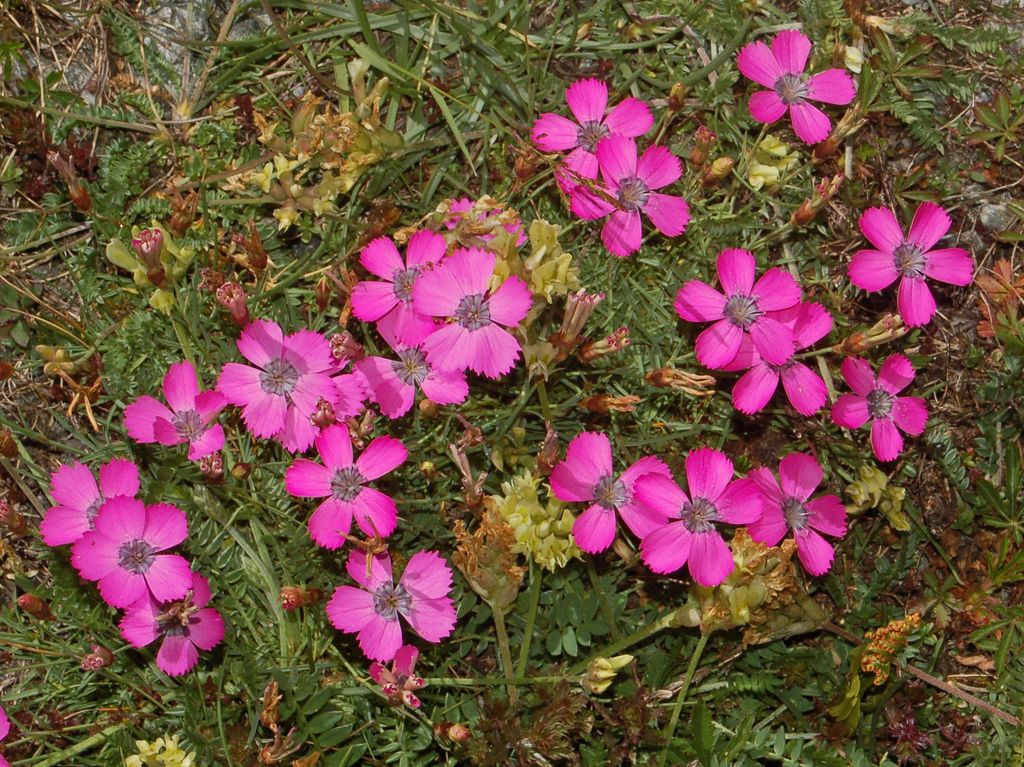
- Plant of Dianthus pavonius

Scientific classification
- Kingdom: Plantae
- Clade: Tracheophytes
- Clade: Angiosperms
- Clade: Eudicots
- Order: Caryophyllales
- Family: Caryophyllaceae
- Genus: Dianthus
- Species: D. pavonius

Binomial name
- Dianthus pavonius Tausch

Synonyms
- Dianthus neglectus Loisel.

= Dianthus pavonius =

Species of flowering plant

Dianthus pavonius, the peacock-eye pink, is a herbaceous perennial plant of the genus Dianthus of the family Caryophyllaceae.

== Etymology ==
The genus name Dianthus derives from the Greek words for divine ("dios") and flower ("anthos"), while the species name pavonius comes from the Latin "pavo" and means "like a peacock".

== Description ==
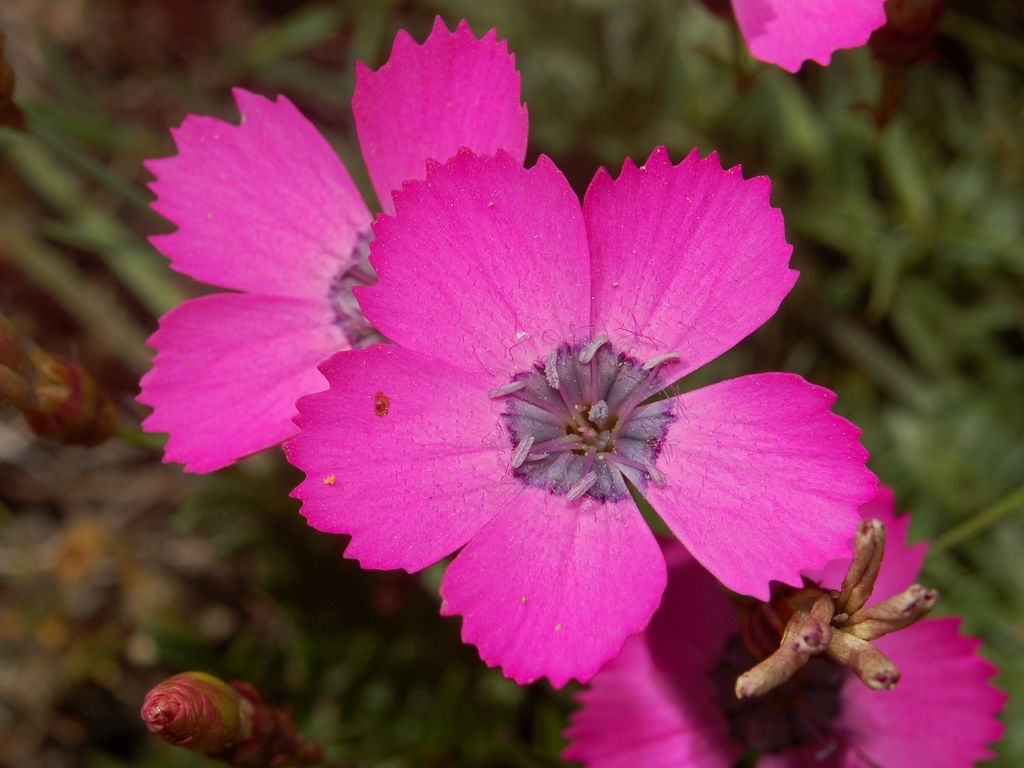
Close-up of a flower of Dianthus pavonius

Dianthus pavonius is a hemicryptophyte scapose plant reaching 2–25 centimetres (0.79–9.84 in) in height. This short-stemmed carnation occurs in dense clumps. It has bluish-greenish pointed leaves and purple-pink coloured flowers, with a blue or brown heart. The flowering period extends from April through May. The fruits are cylindrical capsules with several flat brown seeds.

== Distribution ==
This species is mainly present in the southern Alps in France and Italy and in the Pyrenees.

== Habitat ==
Dianthus pavonius grows in grassland and prefers sunny areas and moderately nutrient-rich moist soil, at an altitude of 1,100–3,000 metres (3,600–9,800 ft) above sea level.

== Gallery ==
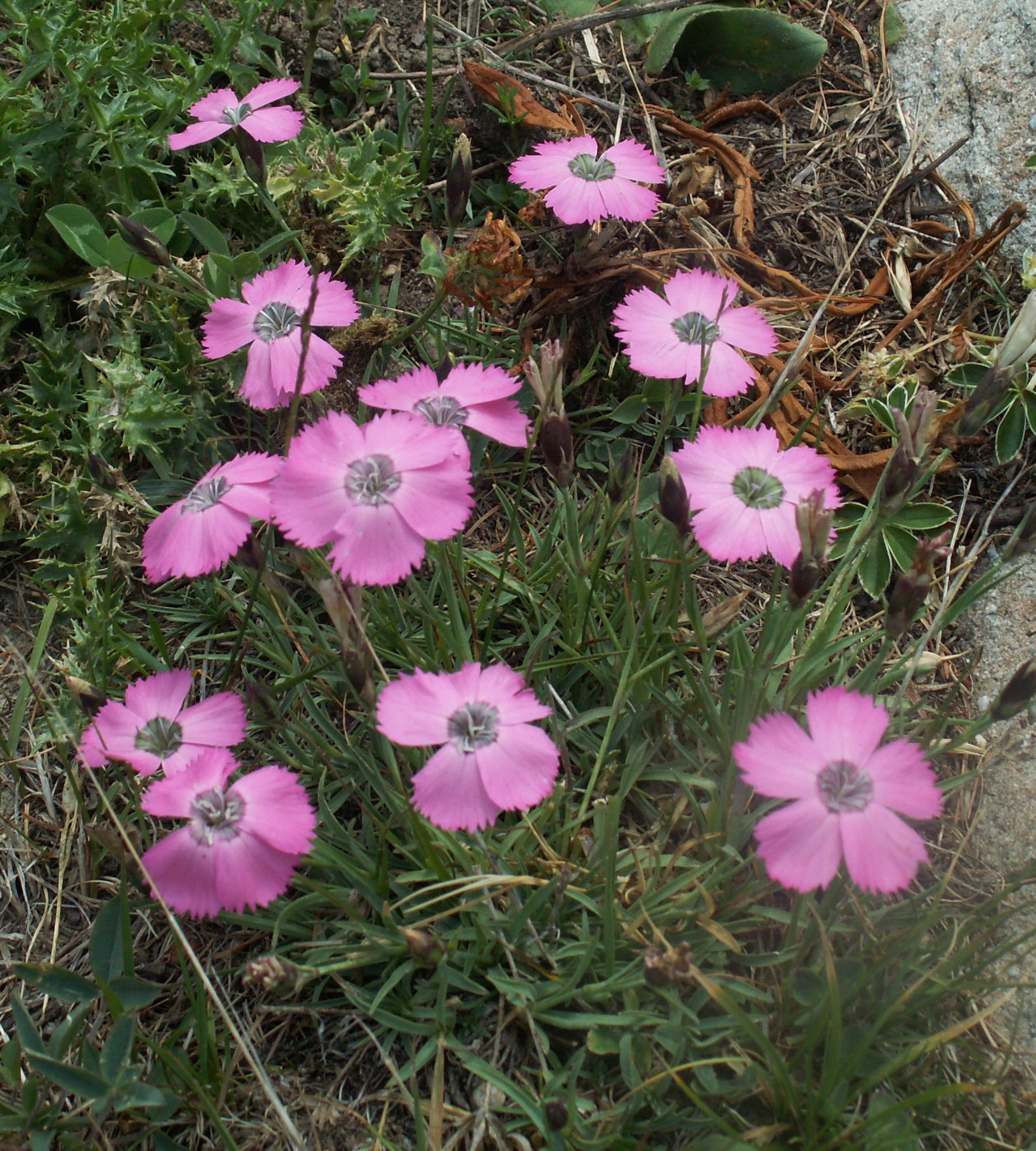
Plant of Dianthus pavonius

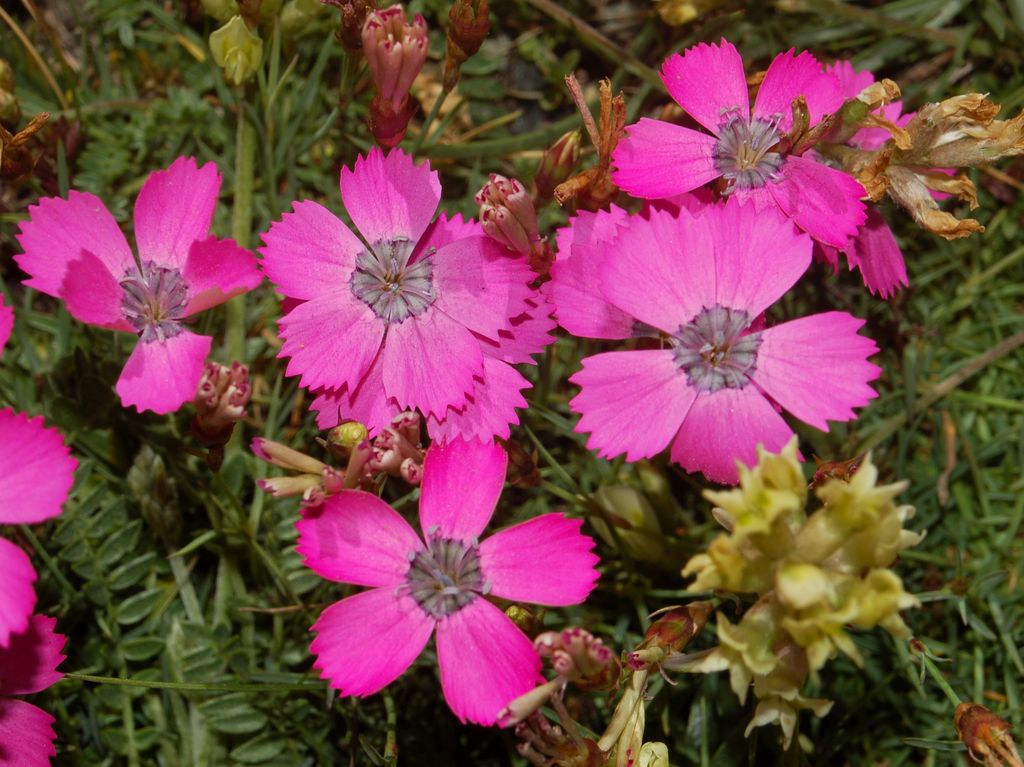
Flowers of Dianthus Pavonius

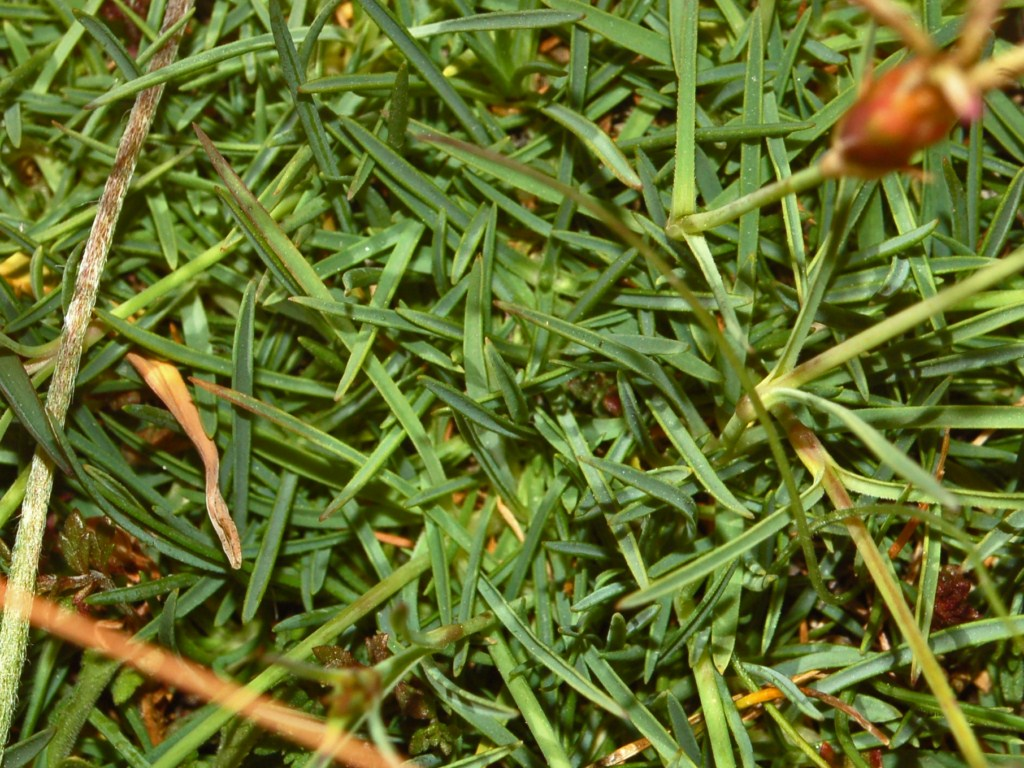
Leaves of Dianthus pavonius
