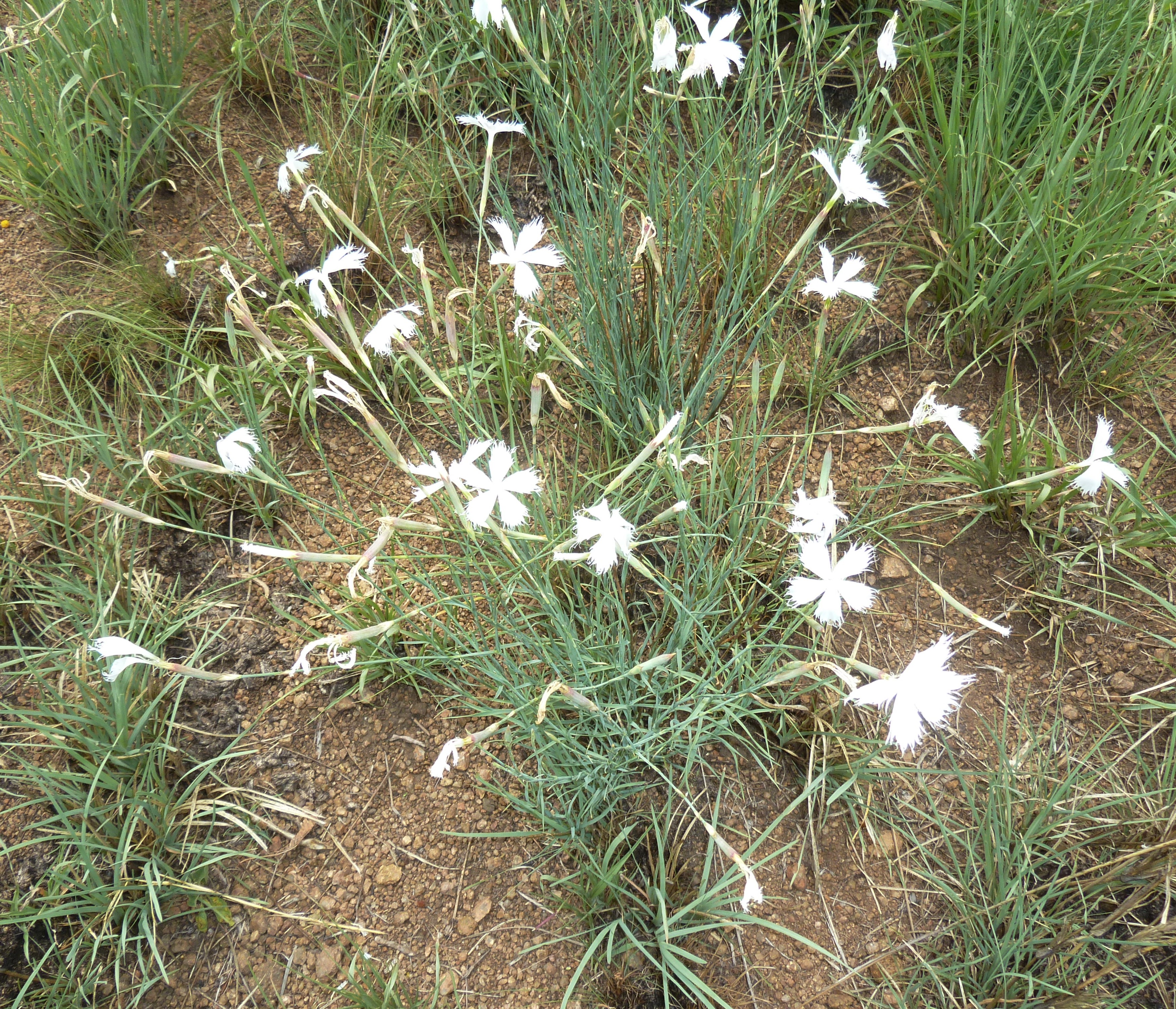

Scientific classification
- Kingdom: Plantae
- Clade: Tracheophytes
- Clade: Angiosperms
- Clade: Eudicots
- Order: Caryophyllales
- Family: Caryophyllaceae
- Genus: Dianthus
- Species: D. mooiensis

Binomial name
- Dianthus mooiensis F.N.Williams

Synonyms
- Dianthus nelsonii F.N.Williams

= Dianthus mooiensis =

Species of flowering plant

Dianthus mooiensis (Frilly carnation) is a species of flowering plant in the family Caryophyllaceae.

It is indigenous to the highveld terrain in the northern parts of South Africa, being recorded from Gauteng Province, around Pretoria and Heidelberg, and as far west as Potchefstroom in the North West Province.

== Description ==
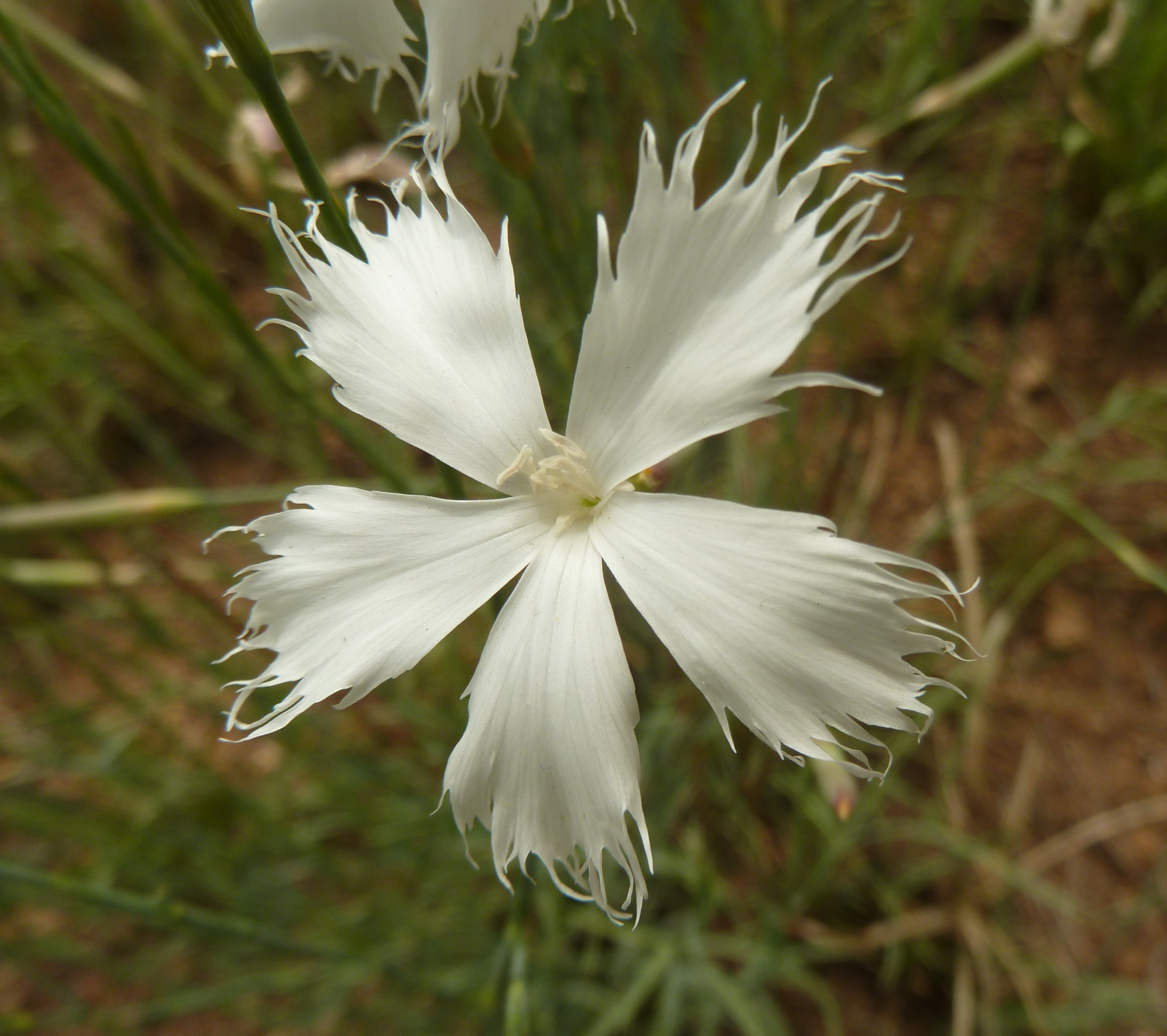
The petals of Dianthus mooiensis are small and deeply fimbriate (frilly)

Dianthus mooiensis is a spreading or tufted herbaceous perennial. The stems are leafy and semi-erect to upright. The leaves along the stem are rigid, and usually 2.5 to 3 cm long (max 6 cm).

The flowers are small and usually white. The petals are deeply fimbriate (frilly) and exserted by only 5 mm (i.e. 5 mm long). The claw is not exserted though (unlike that of D. zeyheri).

The calyx is 1.5 to 1.75 cm in length, with several bract-pairs at the base.
