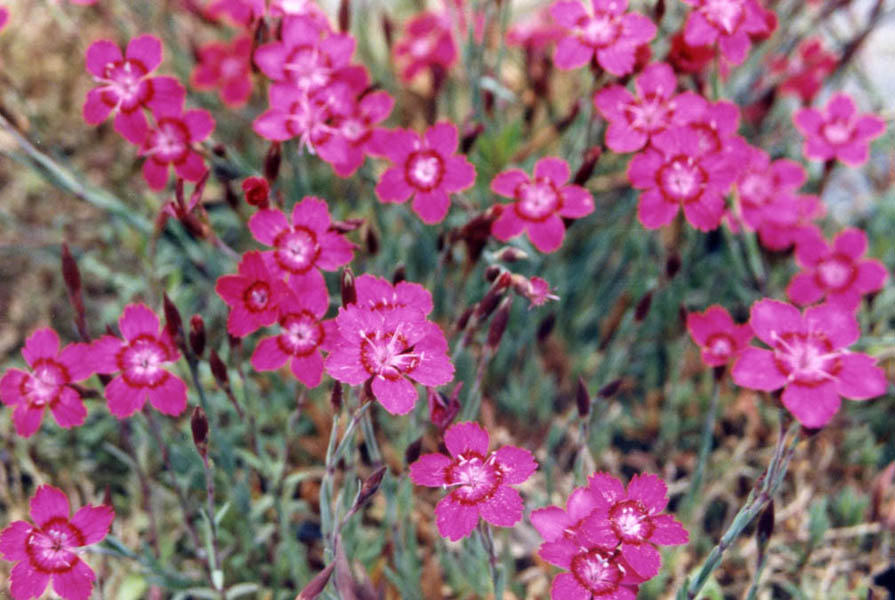

Scientific classification
- Kingdom: Plantae
- Clade: Embryophytes
- Clade: Tracheophytes
- Clade: Spermatophytes
- Clade: Angiosperms
- Clade: Eudicots
- Order: Caryophyllales
- Family: Caryophyllaceae
- Genus: Dianthus
- Species: D. myrtinervius

Binomial name
- Dianthus myrtinervius Griseb.

Synonyms
- Dianthus myrtinervius subsp. zupancicii Micevski & E.Mayer

= Dianthus myrtinervius =

Species of flowering plant

Dianthus myrtinervius, the Albanian pink, is a species of dianthus native to Albania, Greece, and the former Yugoslavia. Preferring well-drained neutral to alkaline soils, it can be grown in rock gardens, raised beds, or as a border along gravel paths. Petite perennials, they are available from commercial suppliers.

== Subspecies ==
Only one subspecies is presently considered valid. It is quite dwarfed, and forms a cushion.

- Dianthus myrtinervius subsp. caespitosus Strid & Papan.
