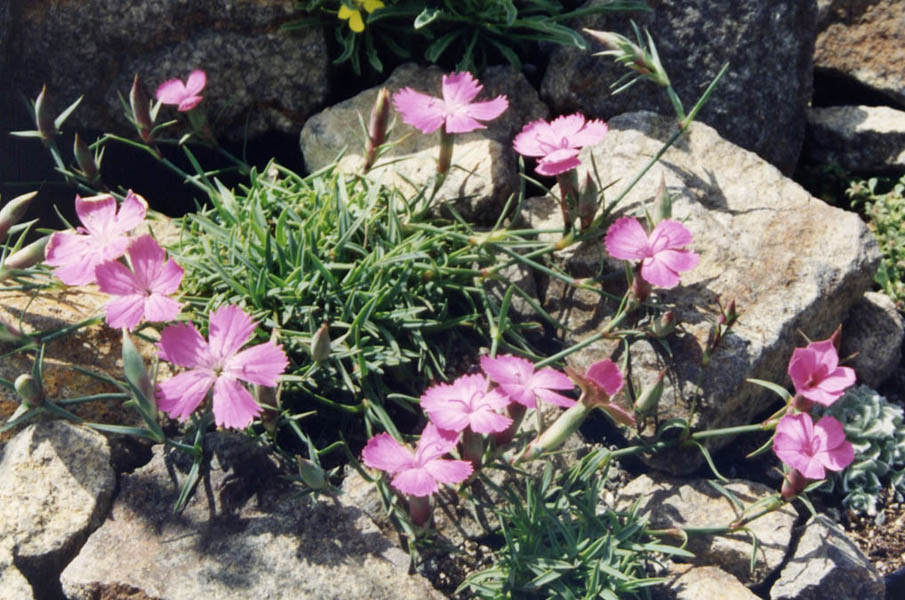

Scientific classification
- Kingdom: Plantae
- Clade: Tracheophytes
- Clade: Angiosperms
- Clade: Eudicots
- Order: Caryophyllales
- Family: Caryophyllaceae
- Genus: Dianthus
- Species: D. haematocalyx

Binomial name
- Dianthus haematocalyx Boiss. & Heldr.

= Dianthus haematocalyx =

Species of plant

Dianthus haematocalyx is a herbaceous perennial plant belonging to the family Caryophyllaceae. It is native to Albania and Greece.
