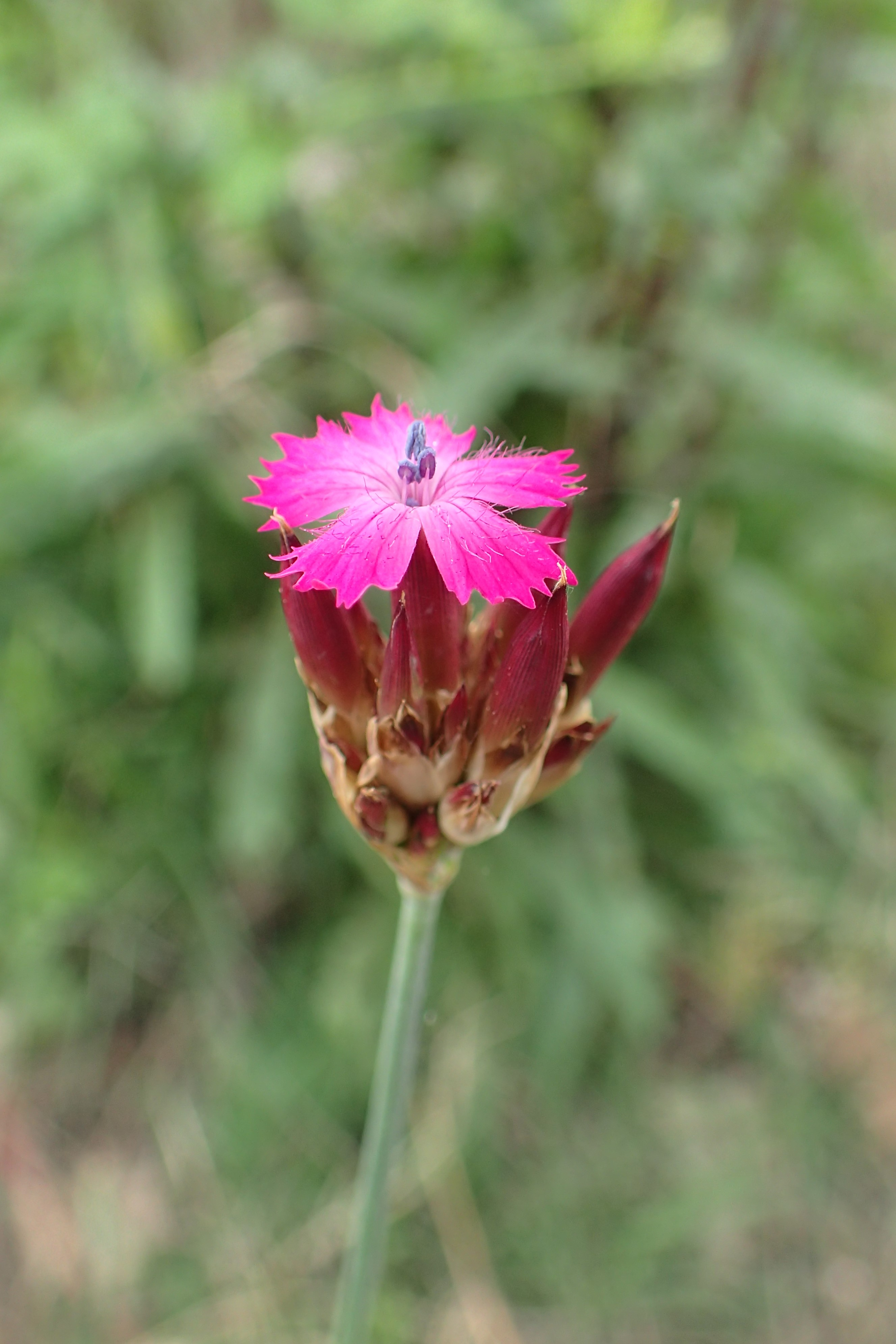

Scientific classification
- Kingdom: Plantae
- Clade: Tracheophytes
- Clade: Angiosperms
- Clade: Eudicots
- Order: Caryophyllales
- Family: Caryophyllaceae
- Genus: Dianthus
- Species: D. giganteus

Binomial name
- Dianthus giganteus d'Urv.

Synonyms
- Dianthus subgiganteus Borbás ex Formánek

= Dianthus giganteus =

Species of flowering plant

Dianthus giganteus, the giant pink, is a species of pink native to Romania, the Balkan peninsula, and possibly nearby areas. A perennial with flowerheads reaching 1 m, it is useful in gardening and landscaping applications where a backdrop of taller plants is needed. It is available from commercial suppliers, with the Royal Horticultural Society considering it to be a good plant to attract pollinators.

== Subspecies ==
A number of putative subspecies have been proposed:

- Dianthus giganteus subsp. banaticus (Heuff.) Tutin
- Dianthus giganteus subsp. croaticus (Borbás) Tutin
- Dianthus giganteus subsp. giganteus d'Urv.
- Dianthus giganteus subsp. haynaldianus (Borbás) Tutin
- Dianthus giganteus subsp. italicus Tutin
- Dianthus giganteus subsp. subgiganteus (Borbás ex Formánek) Hayek
- Dianthus giganteus subsp. vandasii (Velen.) Stoj. & Acht.
