= Dianthus cyprius =

Scientific classification
- Kingdom: Plantae
- Clade: Embryophytes
- Clade: Tracheophytes
- Clade: Spermatophytes
- Clade: Angiosperms
- Clade: Eudicots
- Order: Caryophyllales
- Family: Caryophyllaceae
- Genus: Dianthus
- Species: D. cyprius

Binomial name
- Dianthus cyprius A.K.Jacks. & Turrill

Species of flowering plant

Dianthus cyprius is a shrubby hairless perennial plant with overarching branches up to 90 cm (35 in) long, the flowering branches growing from the sides of stems end in leaf-tufts. The calyx-tube grows up to 2.5 cm (0.98 in) cylindrical, with 4-9 pairs of bracts at the base. Flowers clustered, 2 cm (0.79 in) in diameter; petals pink with some red marking toward the centre. Flowers from June to November. The plant's common name is "Dianthos o Kyprios".

== Distribution ==
Endemic to Cyprus where it is frequent on high limestone cliff faces along the Northern Range, Kornos, St Hilarion, around Halevka and on Kantara Castle walls.
