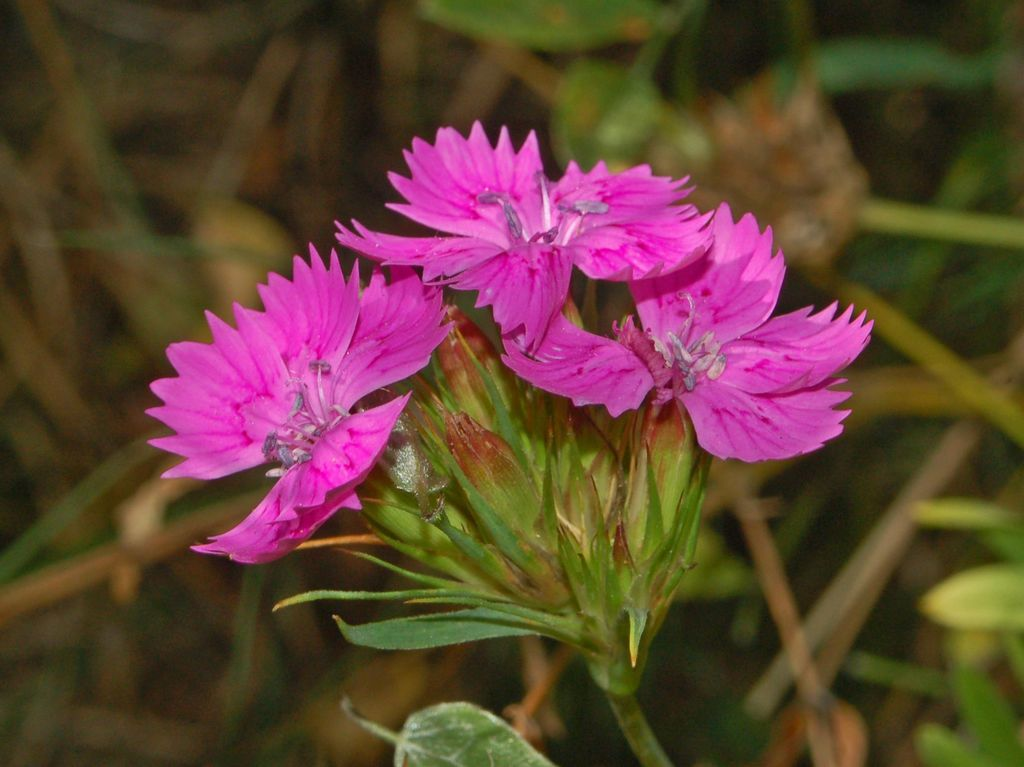

Scientific classification
- Kingdom: Plantae
- Clade: Tracheophytes
- Clade: Angiosperms
- Clade: Eudicots
- Order: Caryophyllales
- Family: Caryophyllaceae
- Genus: Dianthus
- Species: D. balbisii

Binomial name
- Dianthus balbisii Ser.

Synonyms
- Dianthus liburnicus Bartl.; Dianthus ferrugineus Mill.

= Dianthus balbisii =

Species of flowering plant

Dianthus balbisii is a herbaceous perennial plant of the genus Dianthus of the family Caryophyllaceae. The genus name Dianthus derives from the Greek words for divine ("dios") and flower ("anthos"), while the species name balbisii honors the Italian botanist Giovanni Battista Balbis (1765–1831).

== Description ==
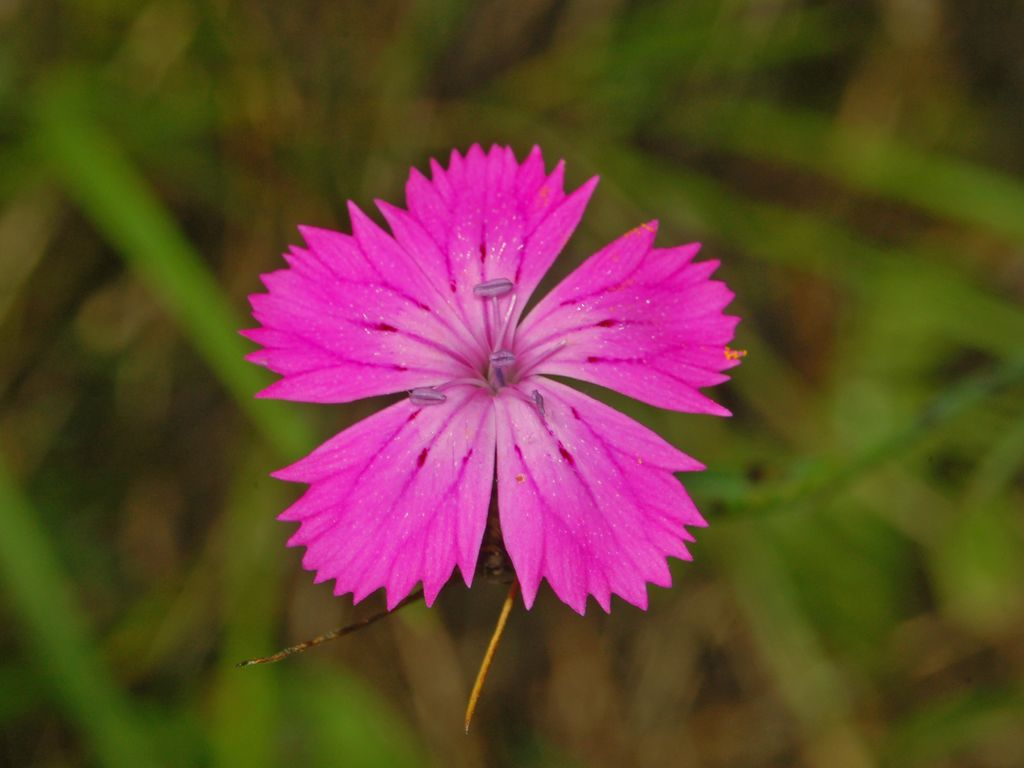
Close-up on a flowers of Dianthus balbisii

Dianthus balbisii is a hemicryptophyte scapose plant reaching on average 20–50 centimetres (7.9–19.7 in) of height. The stem is erect and glabrous, the leaves are opposite, simple and linear. At the base of the cauline leaves a sheath embraces the stem. The epicalyx is formed by many leafy scales. The cylindrical tube of the calyx is green, deep purple-violet close to the 2 mm long teeth. The flowers are gathered into a dense cluster of 2–6 apical flowers in the axil of two bracts poorly differentiated from normal leaves. They have five pink-purplish petals, with frilled margins. The flowering period extends from June through September. The fruits are capsules with several seeds.

== Distribution ==
This species is present in Albania, Former Yugoslavia, Italy and France.

== Habitat ==
This plant grows in dry meadows, woodlands and hillsides. It prefers bright and sunny areas, at an altitude of 0–1,400 metres (0–4,593 ft) above sea level.

== Subspecies ==
- Dianthus balbisii subsp. balbisii
- Dianthus balbisii Ser. subsp. liburnicus (Bartl.) Pignatti

== Gallery ==
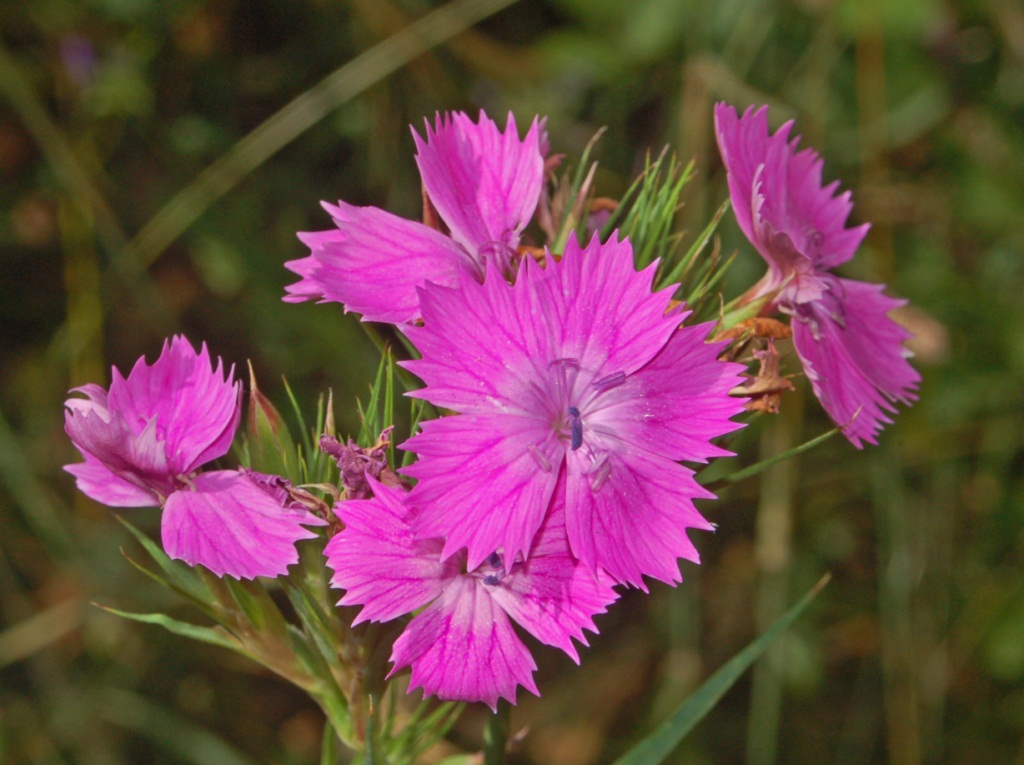
Dianthus balbisii

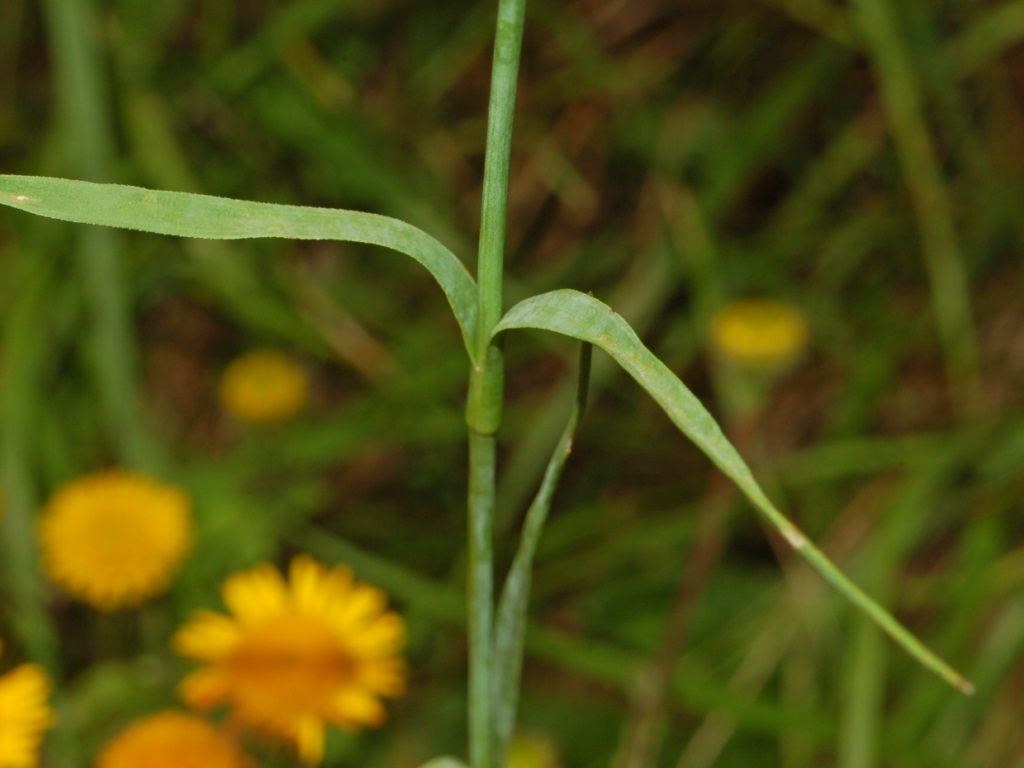
Cauline leaves of Dianthus balbisii
