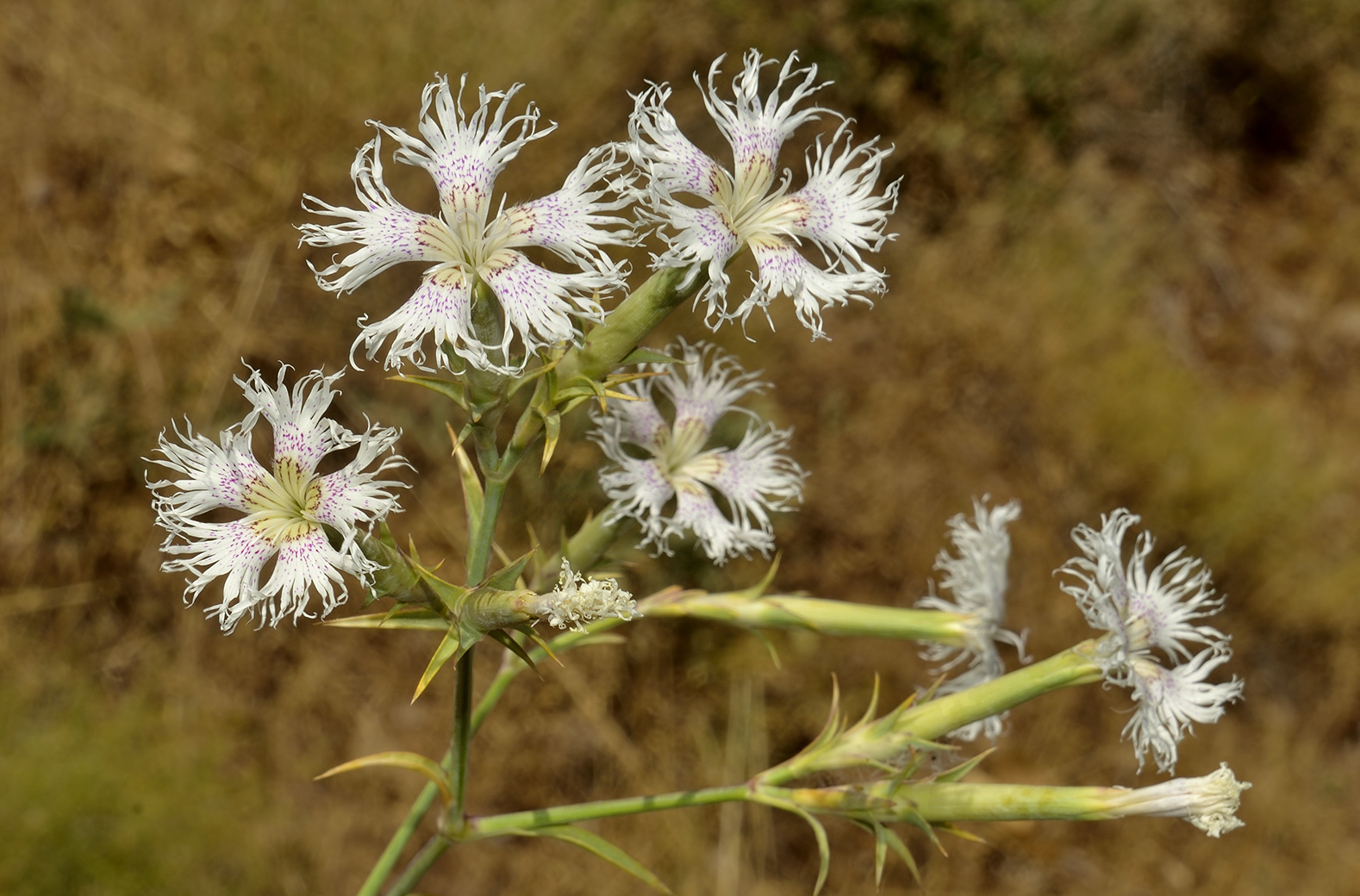

Scientific classification
- Kingdom: Plantae
- Clade: Tracheophytes
- Clade: Angiosperms
- Clade: Eudicots
- Order: Caryophyllales
- Family: Caryophyllaceae
- Genus: Dianthus
- Species: D. libanotis

Binomial name
- Dianthus libanotis Labill.

Synonyms
- Dianthus atomarius Boiss.

= Dianthus libanotis =

Species of plant

Dianthus libanotis, the Mount Libanus pink or Lebanon pink, is a herbaceous perennial plant of the family Caryophyllaceae.

== Description ==
It is a 25–60 cm high perennial subshrub with spiny leaves. Its white petals are dotted with crimson and pink. Its hermaphrodite fragrant flowers end in filiform tassels that bloom from June to August.

== Distribution and habitat ==
Dianthus libanotis is endemic to parts of western Asia, it grows on rocky outcrops in Lebanon, Syria and northern Palestine, Iran, Azerbaijan and Armenia.
