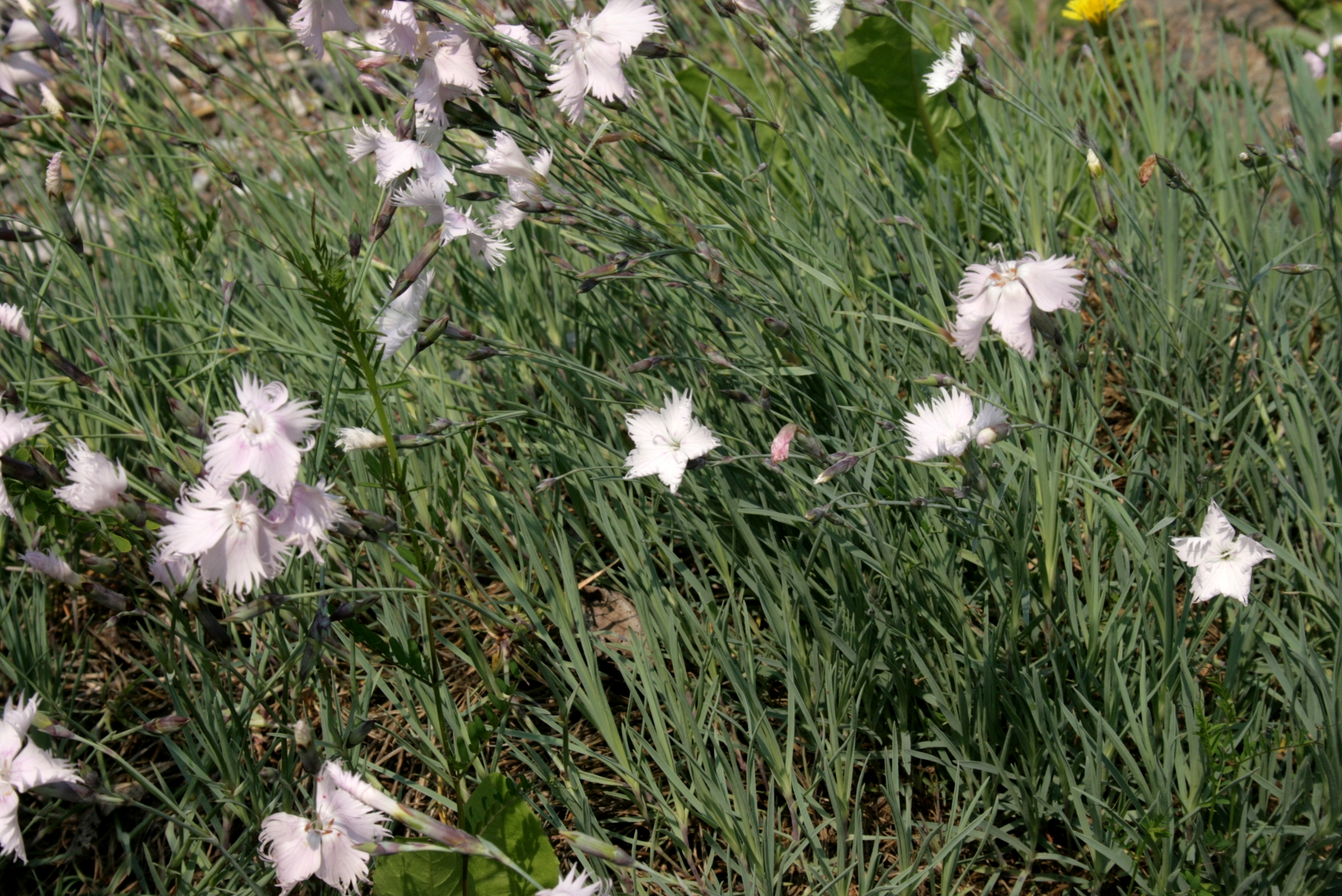

Scientific classification
- Kingdom: Plantae
- Clade: Tracheophytes
- Clade: Angiosperms
- Clade: Eudicots
- Order: Caryophyllales
- Family: Caryophyllaceae
- Genus: Dianthus
- Species: D. anatolicus

Binomial name
- Dianthus anatolicus Boiss.

= Dianthus anatolicus =

Species of plant

Dianthus anatolicus is a herbaceous perennial plant belonging to the family Caryophyllaceae natively occurring from Turkey to Tibet.
