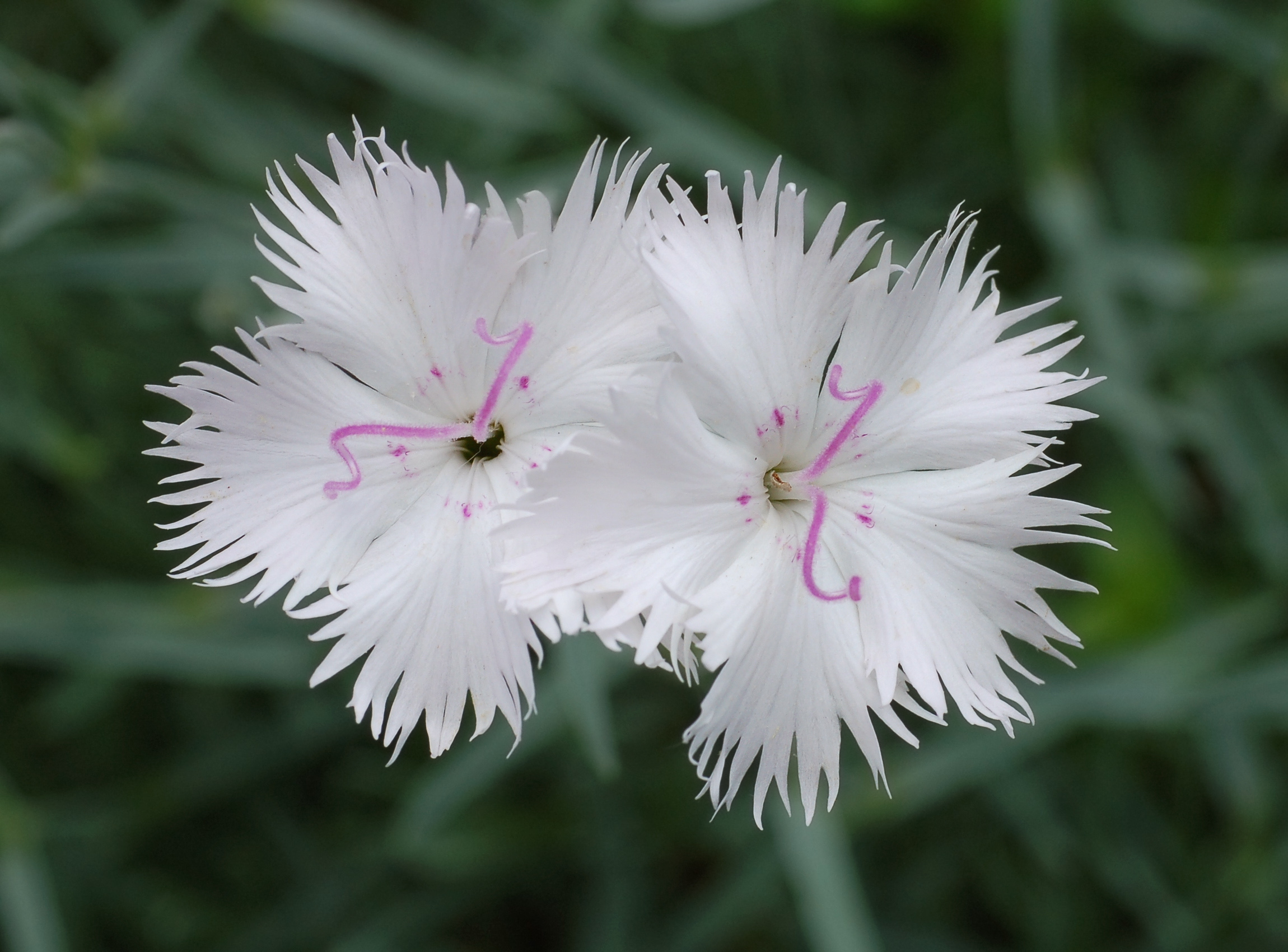

Scientific classification
- Kingdom: Plantae
- Clade: Tracheophytes
- Clade: Angiosperms
- Clade: Eudicots
- Order: Caryophyllales
- Family: Caryophyllaceae
- Genus: Dianthus
- Species: D. japonicus

Binomial name
- Dianthus japonicus Thunb.

= Dianthus japonicus =

Species of flowering plant

Dianthus japonicus, known as seashore pink, is a species of herbaceous perennial plant in the genus Dianthus.
