= Dianthus crenatus =

Scientific classification
- Kingdom: Plantae
- Clade: Embryophytes
- Clade: Tracheophytes
- Clade: Spermatophytes
- Clade: Angiosperms
- Clade: Eudicots
- Order: Caryophyllales
- Family: Caryophyllaceae
- Genus: Dianthus
- Species: D. crenatus

Binomial name
- Dianthus crenatus Thunb. (1794)

Synonyms
- Dianthus inaequalis E.Mey. (1843)

Species of flowering plant

Dianthus crenatus is a species of flowering plant in the family Caryophyllaceae, indigenous to the Western Cape (Swellendam), Eastern Cape and KwaZulu-Natal Provinces of South Africa.

== Description ==
Dianthus crenatus is a perennial with leafy stems. The leaves spread along the middle of the stems are circa 50 mm long, and 3–5 mm broad (the basal leaves are often shorter).

The petals are sub-entire to toothed, each exserted for a length of 15–20 mm, and 10–15 mm broad. The stout calyx is circa 25 mm in length.
