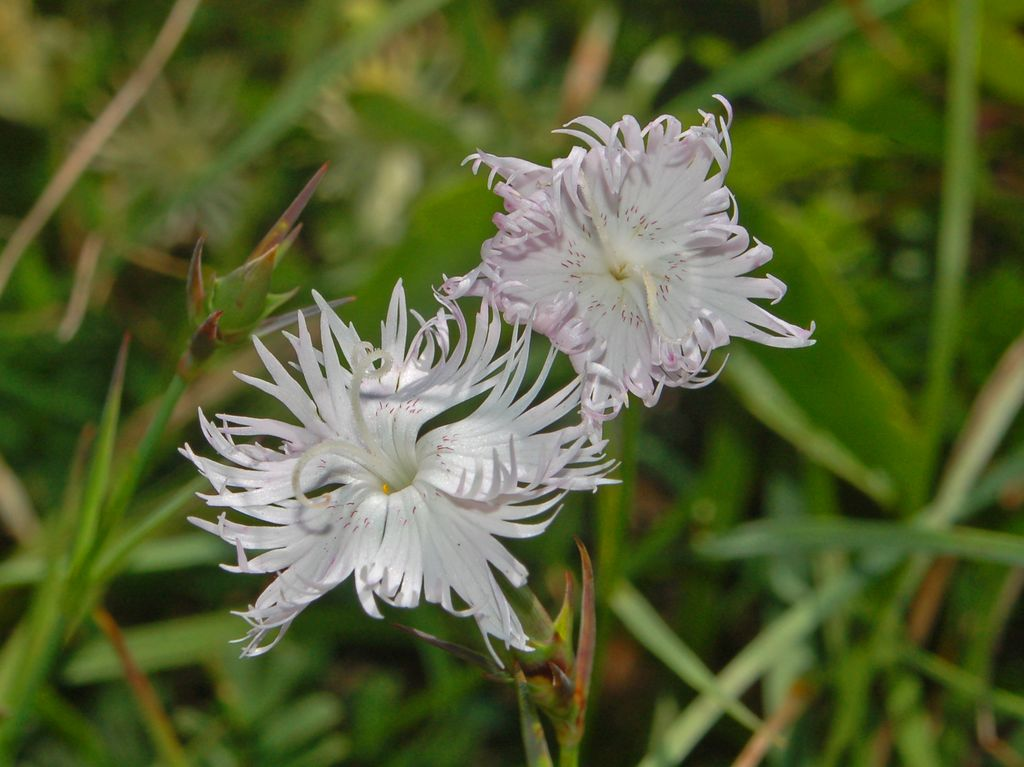

Scientific classification
- Kingdom: Plantae
- Clade: Tracheophytes
- Clade: Angiosperms
- Clade: Eudicots
- Order: Caryophyllales
- Family: Caryophyllaceae
- Genus: Dianthus
- Species: D. monspessulanus

Binomial name
- Dianthus monspessulanus L.

Synonyms
- Dianthus hyssopifolius L.; Dianthus sternbergii Capelli subsp. marsicus (Ten.) Pign.; Dianthus marsicus Ten.

= Dianthus monspessulanus =

Species of flowering plant

Dianthus monspessulanus, the fringed pink, is a herbaceous perennial plant of the genus Dianthus of the family Caryophyllaceae. The genus name Dianthus derives from the Greek words for divine ("dios") and flower ("anthos"), while the species name monspessulanus means "from Montpellier".

== Description ==
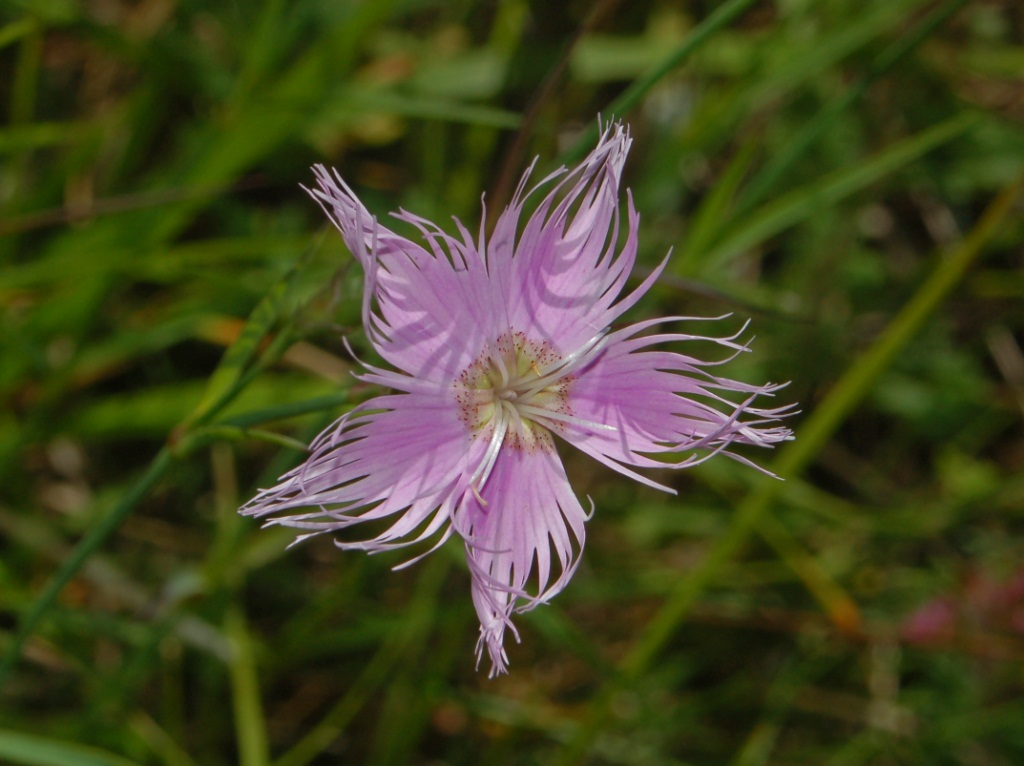
Close-up of a flower

Dianthus monspessulanus is a hemicryptophyte scapose plant reaching on average 30–60 centimetres (12–24 in) of height. The stem is green, erect, glabrous and branched on the top, the leaves are opposite, simple, linear and sessile, more or less erect and flexuous, with a sheath embracing the stem. They are about 3 millimetres (1/8 in) wide and about 10 cm (3 7/8 in) long. The calyx is a green cylindrical tube about 2 cm (3/4 in) long, with reddish teeth. The flowers are hermaphrodite, single or gathered in scapes of 3–5 flowers, with 10 stamens. They have five pink or white petals, 10–15 mm (3/8–9/16 in) long, with fringed margins (hence the common name). The flowering period extends from May through August. The fruits are capsules with a few seeds.

== Distribution and habitat ==
This species is present in Albania, the former Yugoslavia, Italy, France, Switzerland, Austria, Spain and Portugal.

This plant grows in arid grasslands, woodlands and heathlands, at an altitude of 0–2,200 metres (0–7,200 ft) above sea level. It prefers rich and well drained soils in sunny places.
