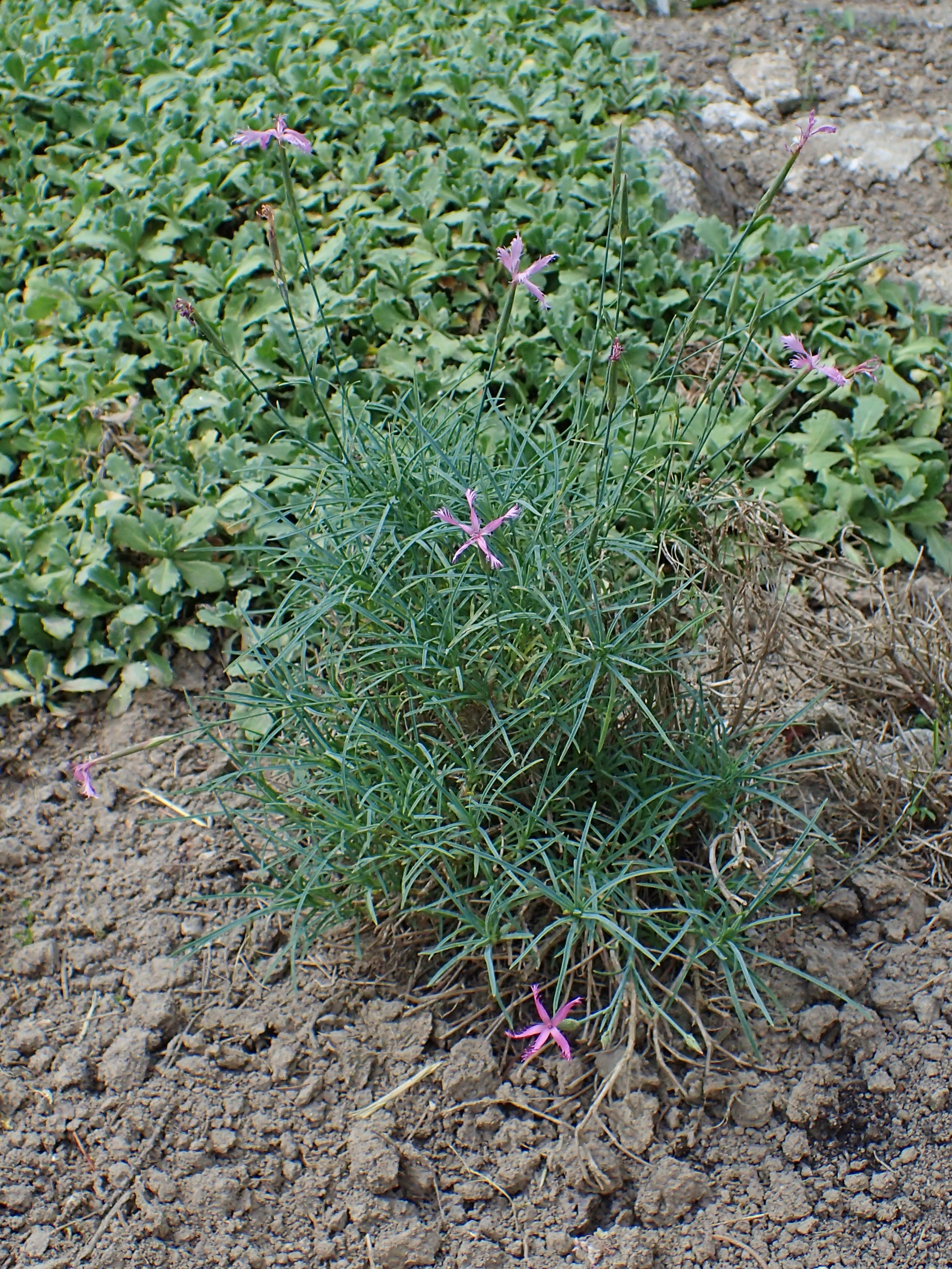

Scientific classification
- Kingdom: Plantae
- Clade: Tracheophytes
- Clade: Angiosperms
- Clade: Eudicots
- Order: Caryophyllales
- Family: Caryophyllaceae
- Genus: Dianthus
- Species: D. orientalis

Binomial name
- Dianthus orientalis Adams

Synonyms
- Dianthus pogonopetalus Boiss. & Kotschy

= Dianthus orientalis =

Species of flowering plant

Dianthus orientalis, called the Georgian pink, is a species of pink in the carnation family found in the Levant, Anatolia, the Transcaucasus and the North Caucasus, Iraq and Iran, and disjunctly in Tibet and Xinjiang in China. Given its preference for drier, rocky and alkaline soils, and its attractive lilac‑pink flowers which appear in autumn, it is being studied as a potential ornamental plant, and for use on green roofs.

== Subspecies ==
A number of subspecies have been described:

- Dianthus orientalis subsp. aphanoneurus Rech.f.
- Dianthus orientalis subsp. gilanicus Rech.f.
- Dianthus orientalis subsp. gorganicus Rech.f.
- Dianthus orientalis subsp. ketzkhovelii (Makaschv.) Nersesian
- Dianthus orientalis subsp. macropetalus (Boiss.) Rech.f.
- Dianthus orientalis subsp. nassireddinii (Stapf) Rech.f.
- Dianthus orientalis subsp. obtusisquameus (Boiss.) Rech.f.
- Dianthus orientalis subsp. stenocalyx (Boiss.) Rech.f.
