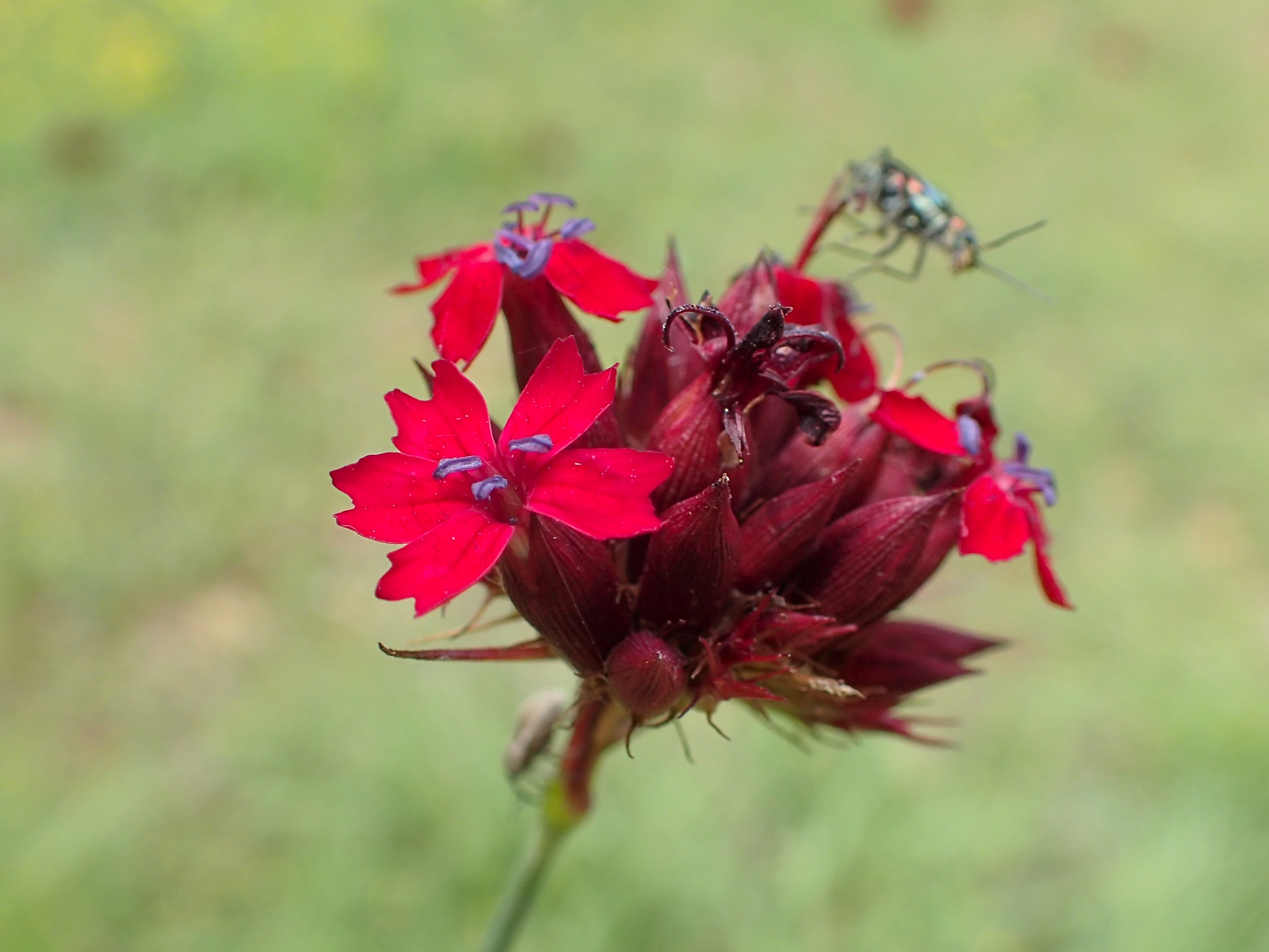
- Close-up of flowers
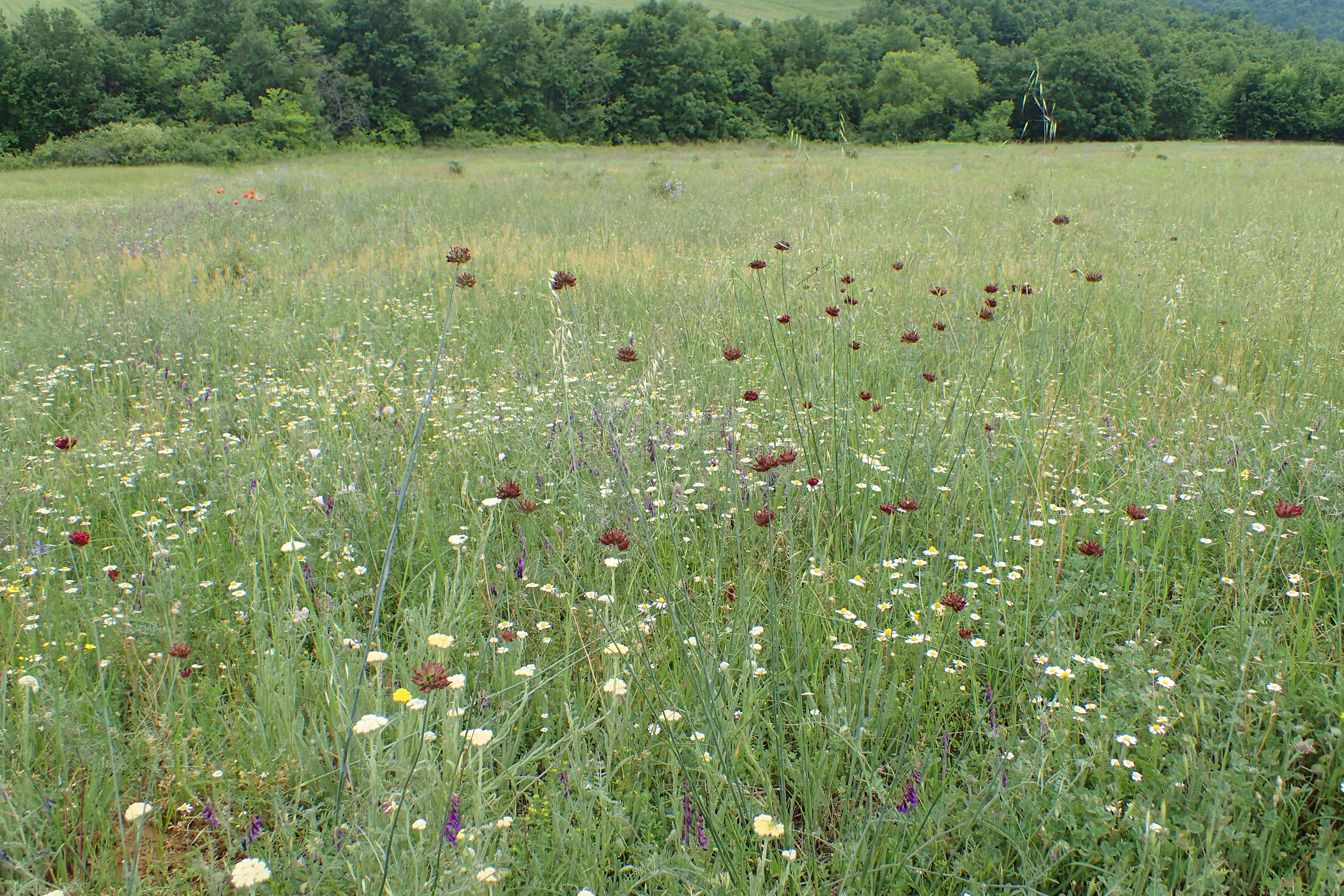
- In a field in northern Greece

Scientific classification
- Kingdom: Plantae
- Clade: Tracheophytes
- Clade: Angiosperms
- Clade: Eudicots
- Order: Caryophyllales
- Family: Caryophyllaceae
- Genus: Dianthus
- Species: D. cruentus

Binomial name
- Dianthus cruentus Griseb.

Synonyms
- List: Dianthus ambiguus Pancic; Dianthus baldaccii Degen; Dianthus brachyzonus Borbás ex Formánek; Dianthus brachyzonus subsp. villiger (Bornm.) Micevski; Dianthus calocephalus Boiss.; Dianthus calocephalus var. villiger Bornm.; Dianthus cibrarius var. leucolepis Hausskn.; Dianthus consanguineus Schur; Dianthus cruentus var. micropetalus Pancic; Dianthus cruentus subsp. turcicus (Velen.) Stoj. & Acht.; Dianthus fastigiatus Pant.; Dianthus holzmannianus Heldr. & Hausskn. ex Nyman; Dianthus hyalolepis Acht. & Lindtner; Dianthus lateritius Halácsy; Dianthus quadrangulus Velen.; Dianthus turcicus Velen.; Dianthus villiger (Bornm.) Bornm.

= Dianthus cruentus =

Species of plant

Dianthus cruentus (syn. Dianthus calocephalus), the blood pink, is a species of flowering plant in the family Caryophyllaceae. It is native to southeastern Europe, Turkey, the Transcaucasus, and Iran, and it has been introduced to Sweden. A semi‑evergreen perennial reaching 60 cm (24 in), it is typically found in sunny locations. Valued for its blood-red flowers and pleasant fragrance, it is widely available from commercial suppliers.

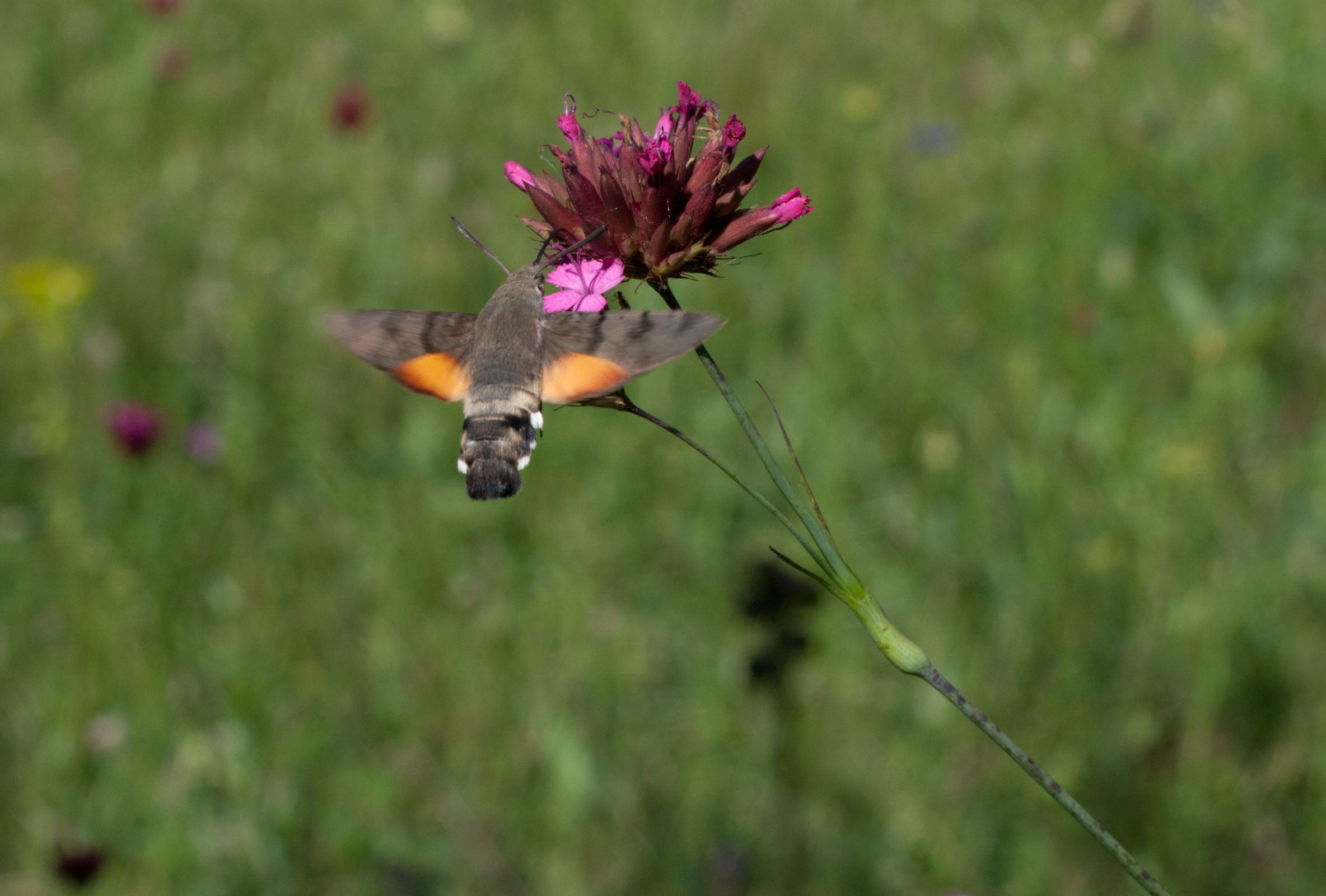
A hummingbird hawk-moth (Macroglossum stellatarum) feeding on nectar
