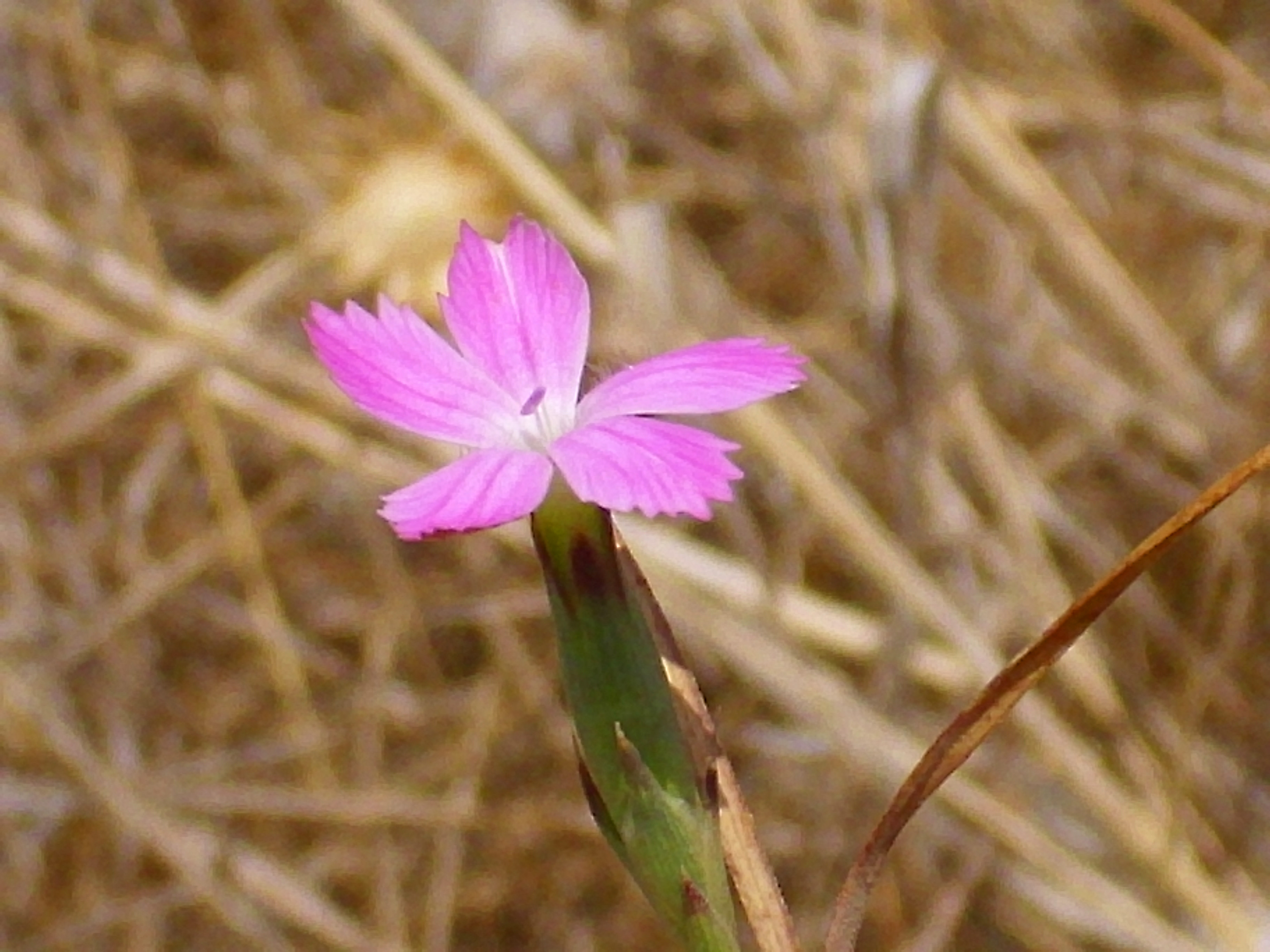

Scientific classification
- Kingdom: Plantae
- Clade: Tracheophytes
- Clade: Angiosperms
- Clade: Eudicots
- Order: Caryophyllales
- Family: Caryophyllaceae
- Genus: Dianthus
- Species: D. pungens

Binomial name
- Dianthus pungens L.

= Dianthus pungens =

Species of flowering plant

Dianthus pungens is a herbaceous perennial plant belonging to the family Caryophyllaceae native to France and Spain.
