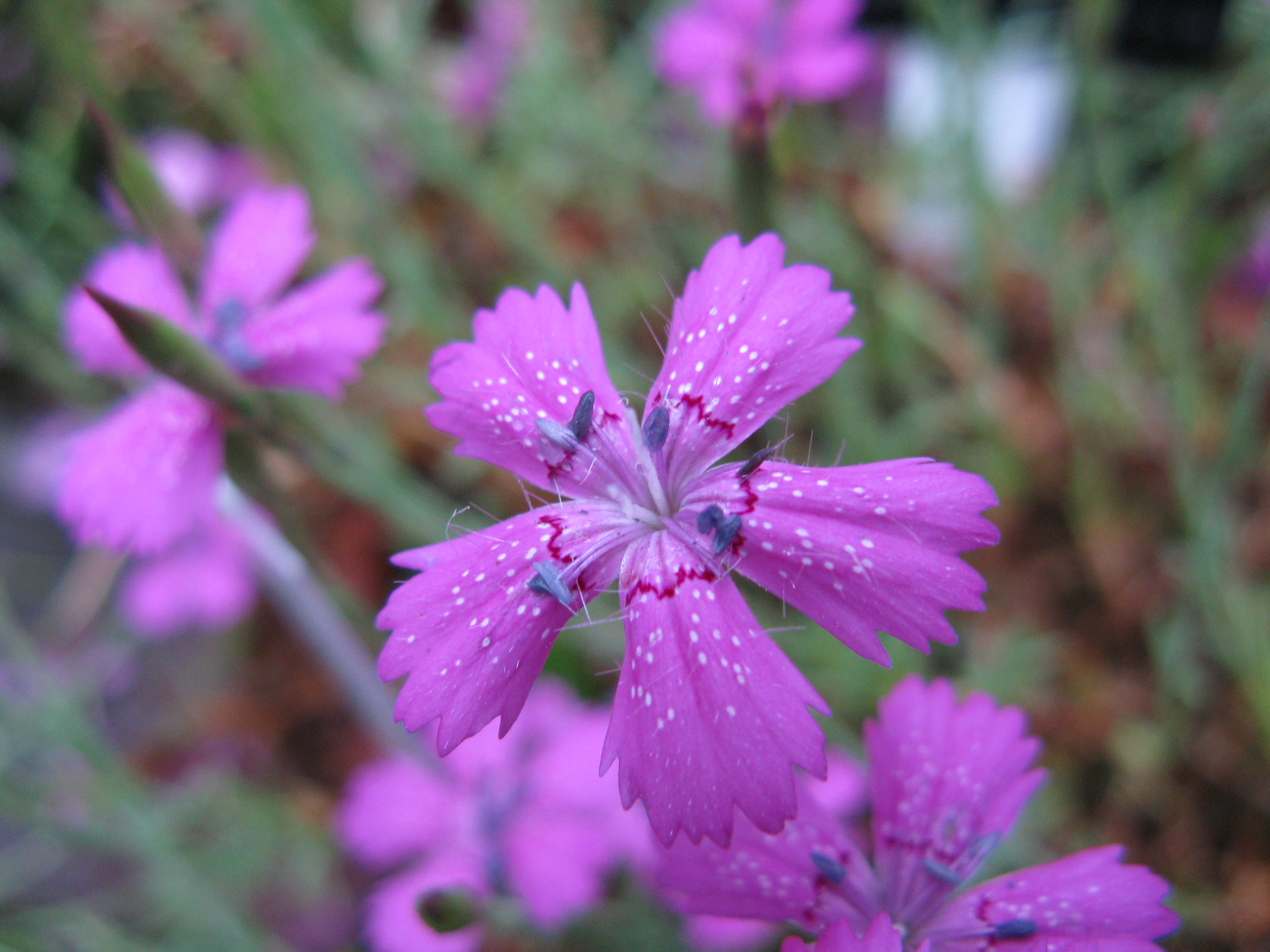

Scientific classification
- Kingdom: Plantae
- Clade: Tracheophytes
- Clade: Angiosperms
- Clade: Eudicots
- Order: Caryophyllales
- Family: Caryophyllaceae
- Genus: Dianthus
- Species: D. glacialis

Binomial name
- Dianthus glacialis Haenke

Synonyms
- Dianthus glacialis var. acaulis Ser.; Dianthus glacialis var. latifolius Ser.; Dianthus glacialis f. reducta Fornac.

= Dianthus glacialis =

Species of flowering plant

Dianthus glacialis, the glacier pink or ice pink, is a species of pink native to the eastern Alps and the Carpathians. A dwarf species, it reaches at most 10 cm (3.9 in), and prefers to grow on granite.
