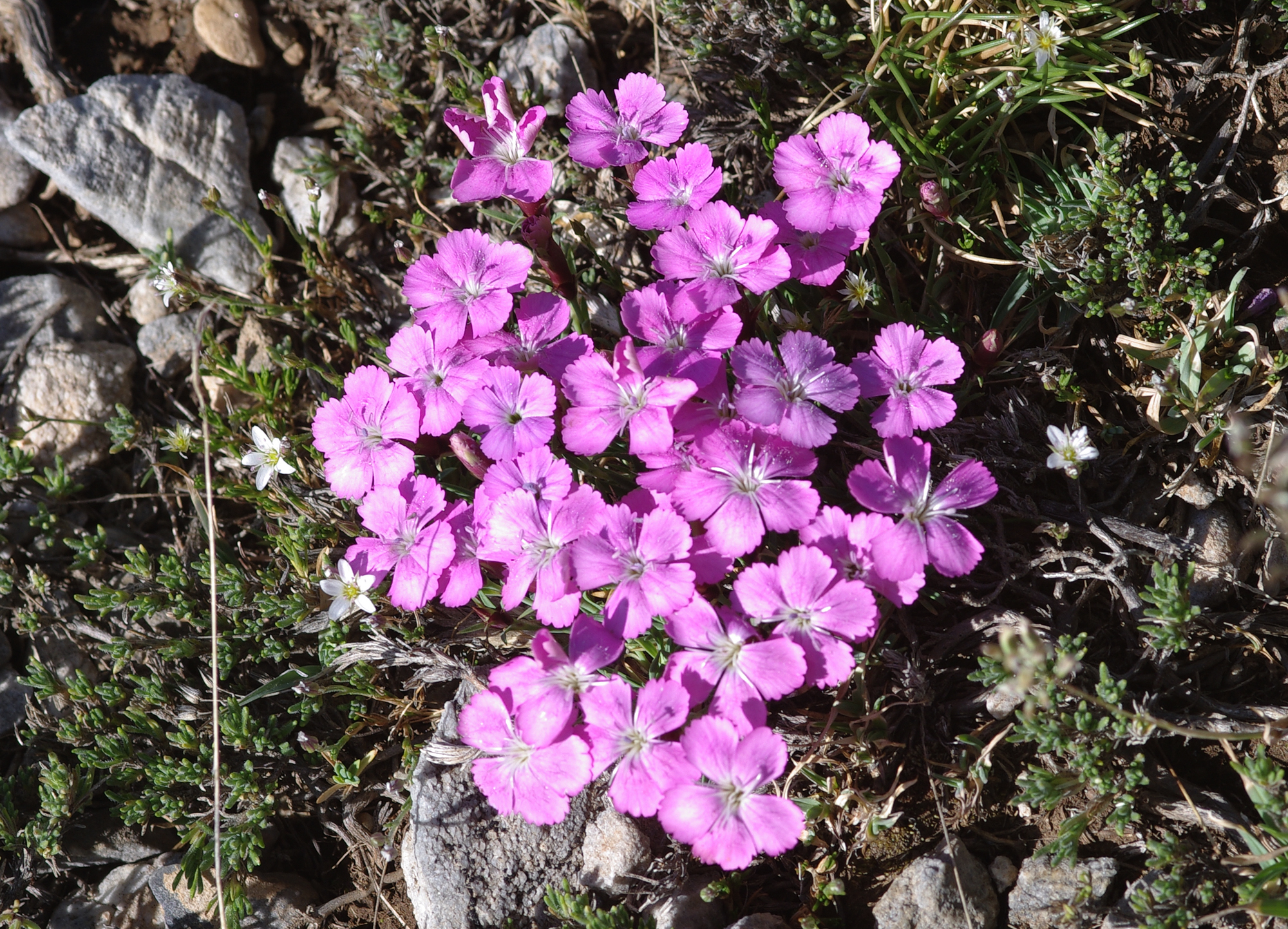

Scientific classification
- Kingdom: Plantae
- Clade: Tracheophytes
- Clade: Angiosperms
- Clade: Eudicots
- Order: Caryophyllales
- Family: Caryophyllaceae
- Genus: Dianthus
- Species: D. brevicaulis

Binomial name
- Dianthus brevicaulis Fenzl

= Dianthus brevicaulis =

Species of flowering plant

Dianthus brevicaulis is a species of flowering plant in the family Caryophyllaceae. The species is endemic to Turkey.
