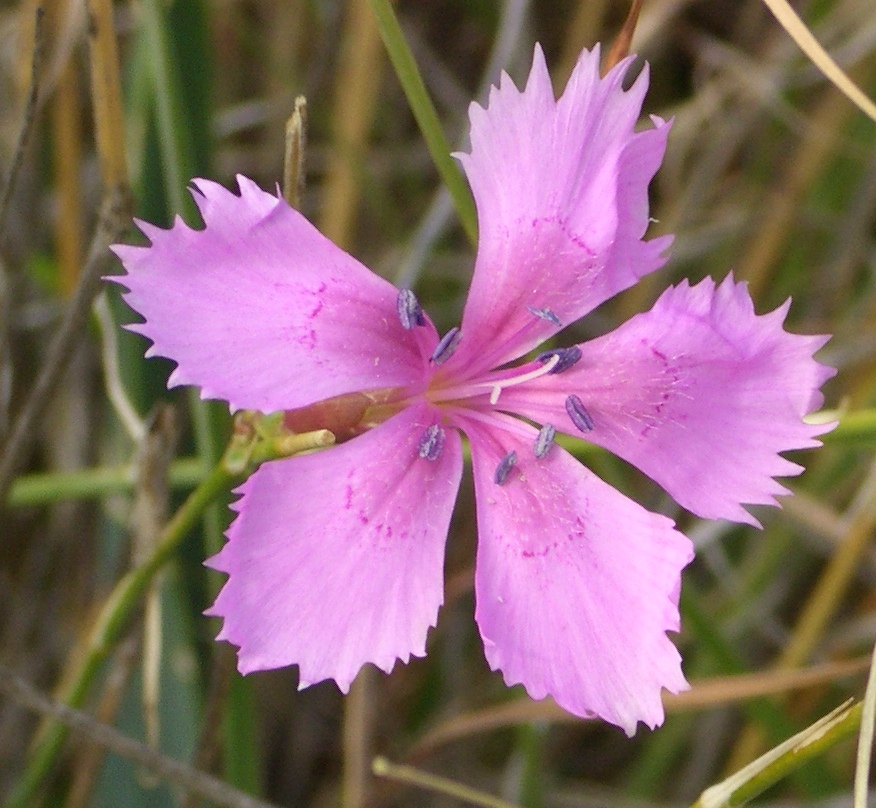
- Dianthus caryophyllus flower

Scientific classification
- Kingdom: Plantae
- Clade: Tracheophytes
- Clade: Angiosperms
- Clade: Eudicots
- Order: Caryophyllales
- Family: Caryophyllaceae
- Genus: Dianthus; L.

Type species
- Dianthus caryophyllus

= Dianthus =

Genus of flowering plants

Dianthus (/daɪˈænθəs/ dy-AN-thəs) is a genus of about 340 species of flowering plants in the family Caryophyllaceae, native mainly to Europe and Asia, with a few species in northern and southern Africa, and one species (D. repens) in arctic North America. A least two species are introduced in North America: Dianthus armeria and Dianthus deltoides. Common names include carnation (D. caryophyllus), pink (D. plumarius and related species), and sweet william (D. barbatus).

== Description ==
The species are mostly herbaceous perennials (though a few are annual or biennial) and some are low subshrubs with woody basal stems. The leaves are opposite, simple, mostly linear and often strongly glaucous grey green to blue green. The flowers have five petals, typically with a frilled or pinked margin, and are (in almost all species) pale to dark pink. One species, D. knappii, has yellow flowers with a purple centre. Some species, particularly the perennial pinks, are noted for their strong spicy fragrance.

== Taxonomy ==
=== Species ===
Selected species include:

- Dianthus acicularis
- Dianthus albens – wild pink
- Dianthus alpinus – Alpine pink
- Dianthus anatolicus
- Dianthus arenarius – sand pink
- Dianthus armeria – Deptford pink
- Dianthus balbisii
- Dianthus barbatus – sweet william
- Dianthus basuticus – Lesotho pink
- Dianthus biflorus
- Dianthus bolusii – mountain pink
- Dianthus brevicaulis
- Dianthus broteri
- Dianthus burgasensis
- Dianthus caespitosus – Karoo pink
- Dianthus callizonus
- Dianthus campestris
- Dianthus capitatus
- Dianthus carthusianorum – Carthusian pink
- Dianthus caryophyllus – carnation or clove pink
- Dianthus chinensis – China pink (syn. Dianthus amurensis)
- Dianthus crenatus
- Dianthus cruentus – blood pink
- Dianthus cyprius – North Cyprus pink
- Dianthus deltoides – maiden pink
- Dianthus erinaceus
- Dianthus fragrans
- Dianthus freynii
- Dianthus fruticosus
- Dianthus furcatus
- Dianthus giganteus – giant pink
- Dianthus glacialis
- Dianthus gracilis
- Dianthus graniticus
- Dianthus gratianopolitanus – Cheddar pink
- Dianthus haematocalyx
- Dianthus hyssopifolius subsp. gallicus – French pink or Jersey pink
- Dianthus japonicus – seashore pink
- Dianthus japigicus
- Dianthus kladovanus
- Dianthus knappii
- Dianthus libanotis – Lebanon pink
- Dianthus lusitanus
- Dianthus microlepis
- Dianthus micropetalus – grassveld pink
- Dianthus moesiacus
- Dianthus monspessulanus – fringed pink
- Dianthus mooiensis - frilly carnation
- Dianthus myrtinervius – Albanian pink
- Dianthus nardiformis
- Dianthus nitidus
- Dianthus orientalis
- Dianthus pavonius
- Dianthus pendulus
- Dianthus petraeus
- Dianthus pinifolius
- Dianthus plumarius – garden pink, wild pink
- Dianthus pungens
- Dianthus repens – boreal carnation
- Dianthus scardicus
- Dianthus seguieri – Sequier's pink
- Dianthus serotinus – late pink
- Dianthus simulans
- Dianthus spiculifolius
- Dianthus squarrosus
- Dianthus strictus
- Dianthus subacaulis
- Dianthus superbus – large pink, nadeshiko
- Dianthus sylvestris – wood pink
- Dianthus tenuifolius
- Dianthus thunbergii – Thunberg's wild pink
- Dianthus urumoffii
- Dianthus zonatus

Hybrids include;

- 'Devon Xera' – Fire Star Dianthus
- 'John Prichard'

=== Etymology ===
The name Dianthus is from the Greek διόσανθος, a compound from the words Δῖος Dios ("of Zeus") and ἄνθος anthos ("flower"), and was cited by the Greek botanist Theophrastus. The colour pink may be named after the flower, coming from the frilled edge of the flowers: the verb "to pink" dates from the 14th century and means "to decorate with a perforated or punched pattern", as demonstrated by the name of "pinking shears", special scissors for cloth that create a zigzag or decorative edge that discourages fraying. Alternatively, "pink" may be derived from the Dutch "pinksteren" alluding to the season of flowering ("pinksteren" meaning "Pentecost" in Dutch). Thus, the colour may be named after the flower, rather than the flower after the colour.

== Ecology ==
Dianthus species are used as food plants by the larvae of some Lepidoptera species including cabbage moth, double-striped pug, large yellow underwing, and the lychnis. Also three species of Coleophora case-bearers feed exclusively on Dianthus; C. dianthi, C. dianthivora, and C. musculella (which feeds exclusively on D. superbus).

== Cultivation ==
Since 1717, dianthus species have been extensively bred and hybridised to produce many thousands of cultivars for garden use and floristry, in all shades of white, pink, yellow, and red, with a huge variety of flower shapes and markings. They are often divided into the following main groups:

- Border carnations – fully hardy, growing to 60 cm (24 in), large blooms
- Perpetual flowering carnations – grown under glass, flowering throughout the year, often used for exhibition purposes, growing to 150 cm (59 in)
- Malmaison carnations – derived from the variety 'Souvenir de la Malmaison', growing to 70 cm (28 in), grown for their intense "clove" fragrance
- Old-fashioned pinks – older varieties; evergreen perennials forming mounds of blue-green foliage with masses of flowers in summer, growing to 45 cm (18 in)
- Modern pinks – newer varieties, growing to 45 cm (18 in), often blooming two or three times per year
- Alpine pinks – mat-forming perennials, suitable for the rockery or alpine garden, growing to 10 cm (4 in)

Over 100 varieties have gained the Royal Horticultural Society's Award of Garden Merit.

== In culture ==
In the language of flowers, pink Dianthus symbolize boldness.

Dianthus gratianopolitanus – the Cheddar pink – was chosen as the county flower of Somerset in 2002 following a poll by the wild flora conservation charity Plantlife. Dianthus japonicus is the official flower of Hiratsuka, Kanagawa, Japan.

In Japan, Dianthus superbus – the fringed pink or nadeshiko – is used in the term Yamato nadeshiko to describe the archetype of a traditional ideal woman.

== Gallery ==
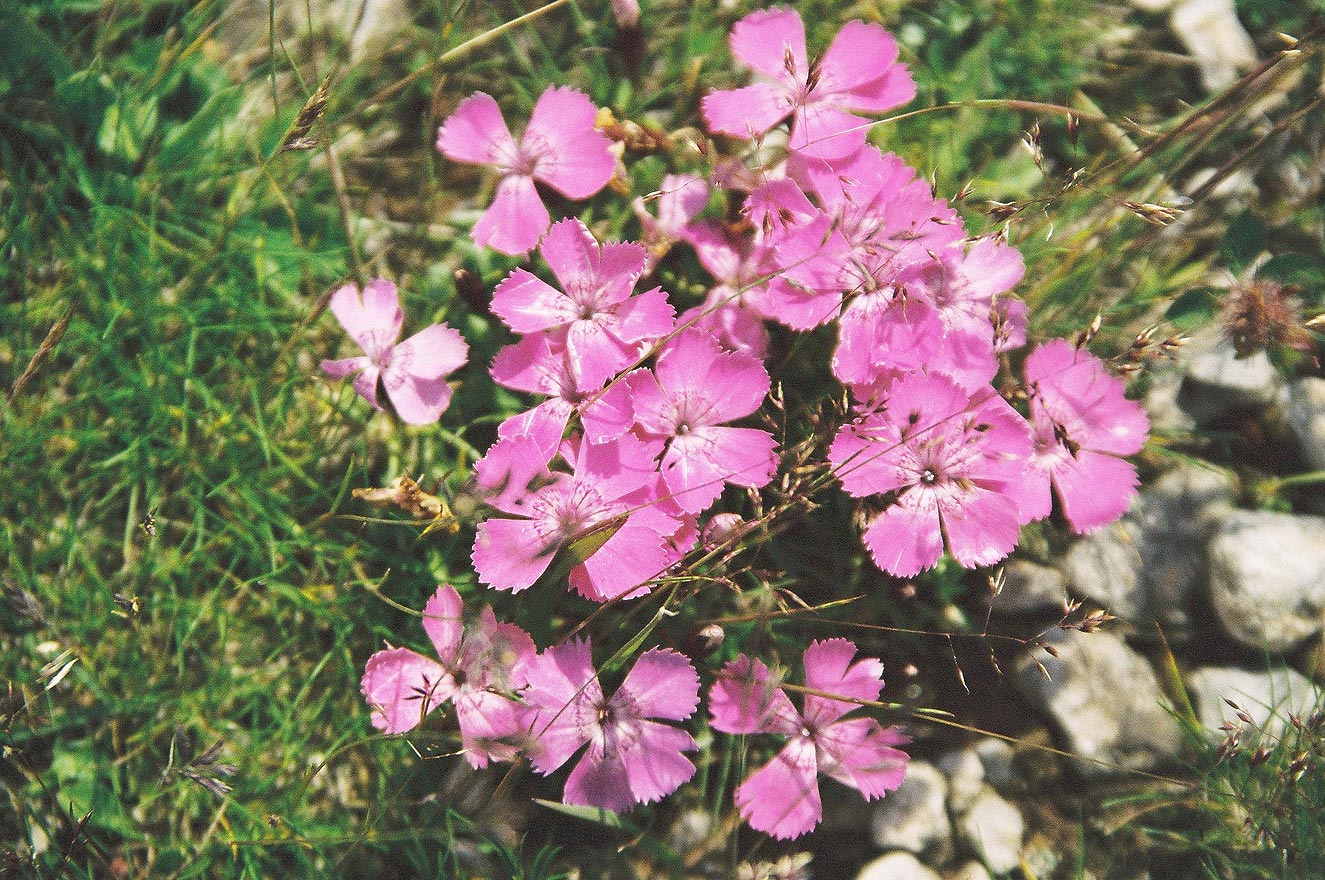
Dianthus alpinus

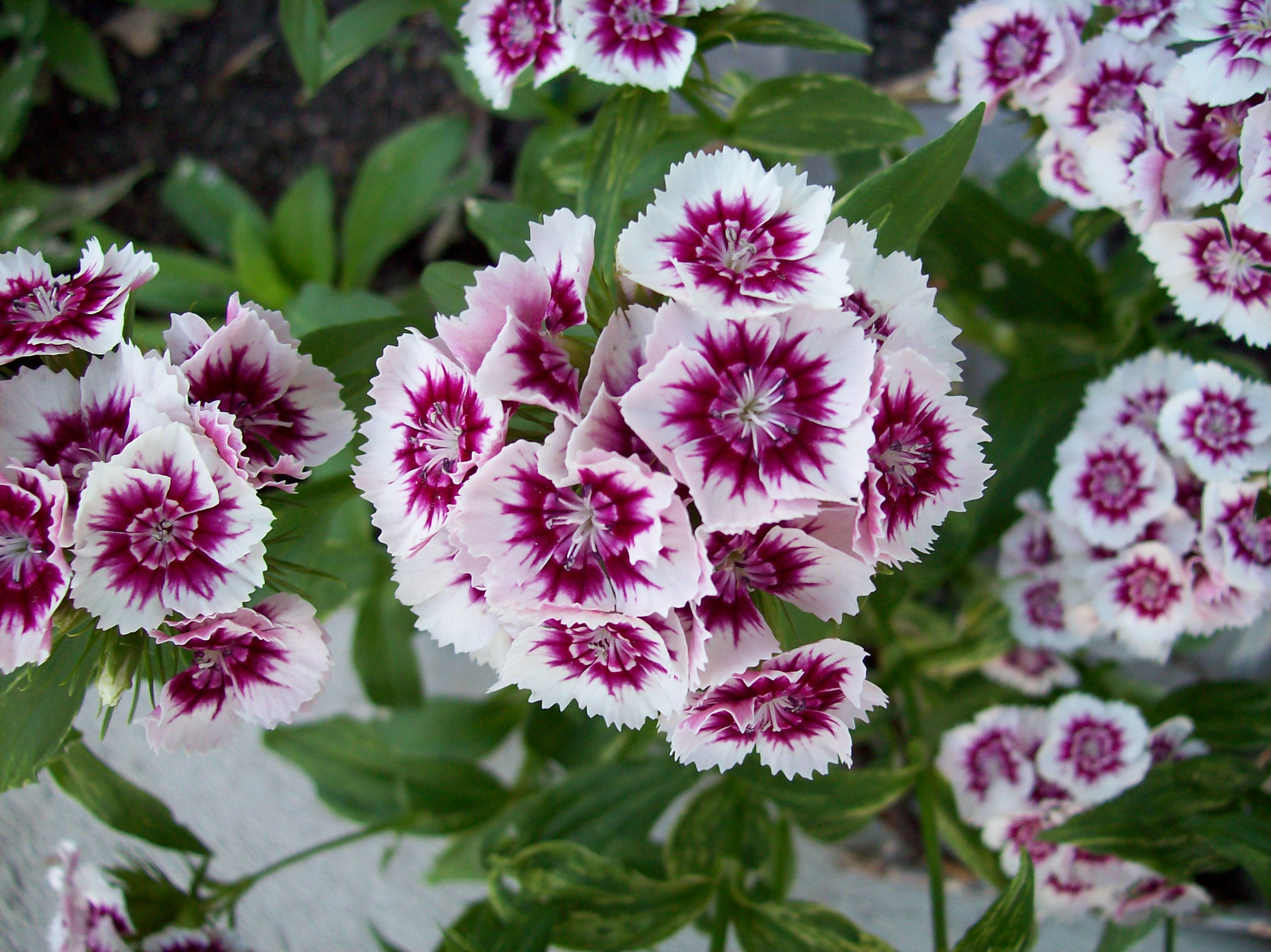
Dianthus barbatus

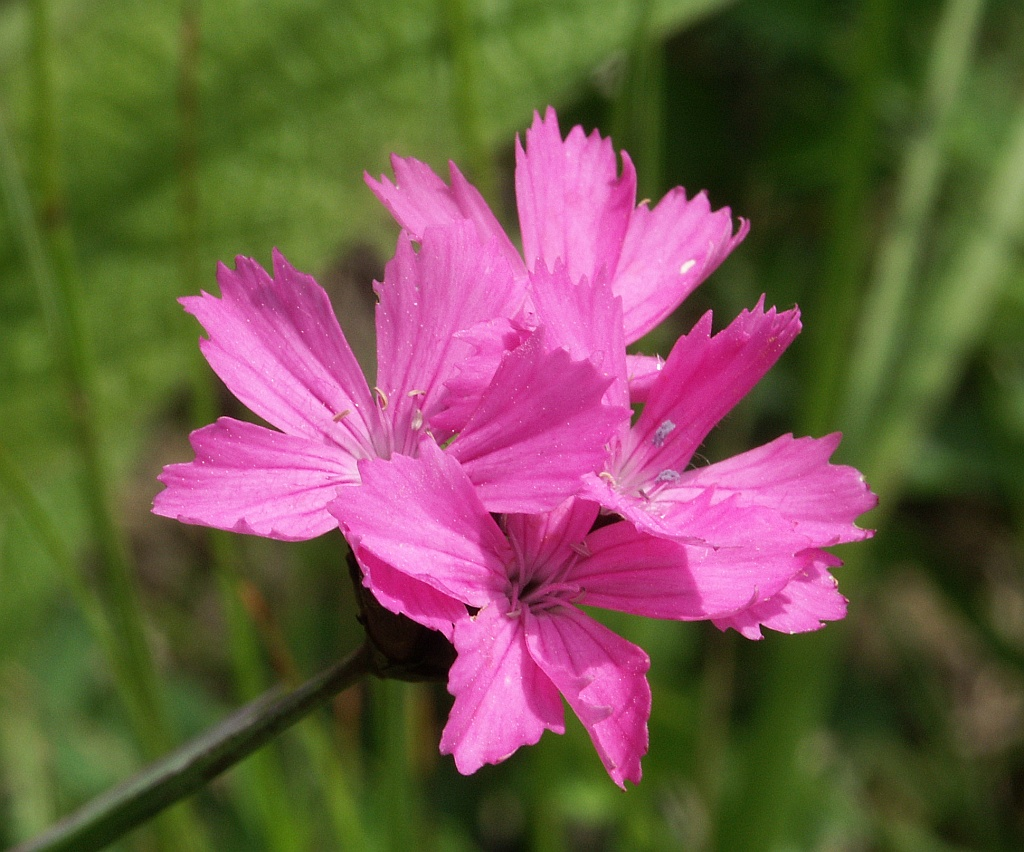
Dianthus carthusianorum

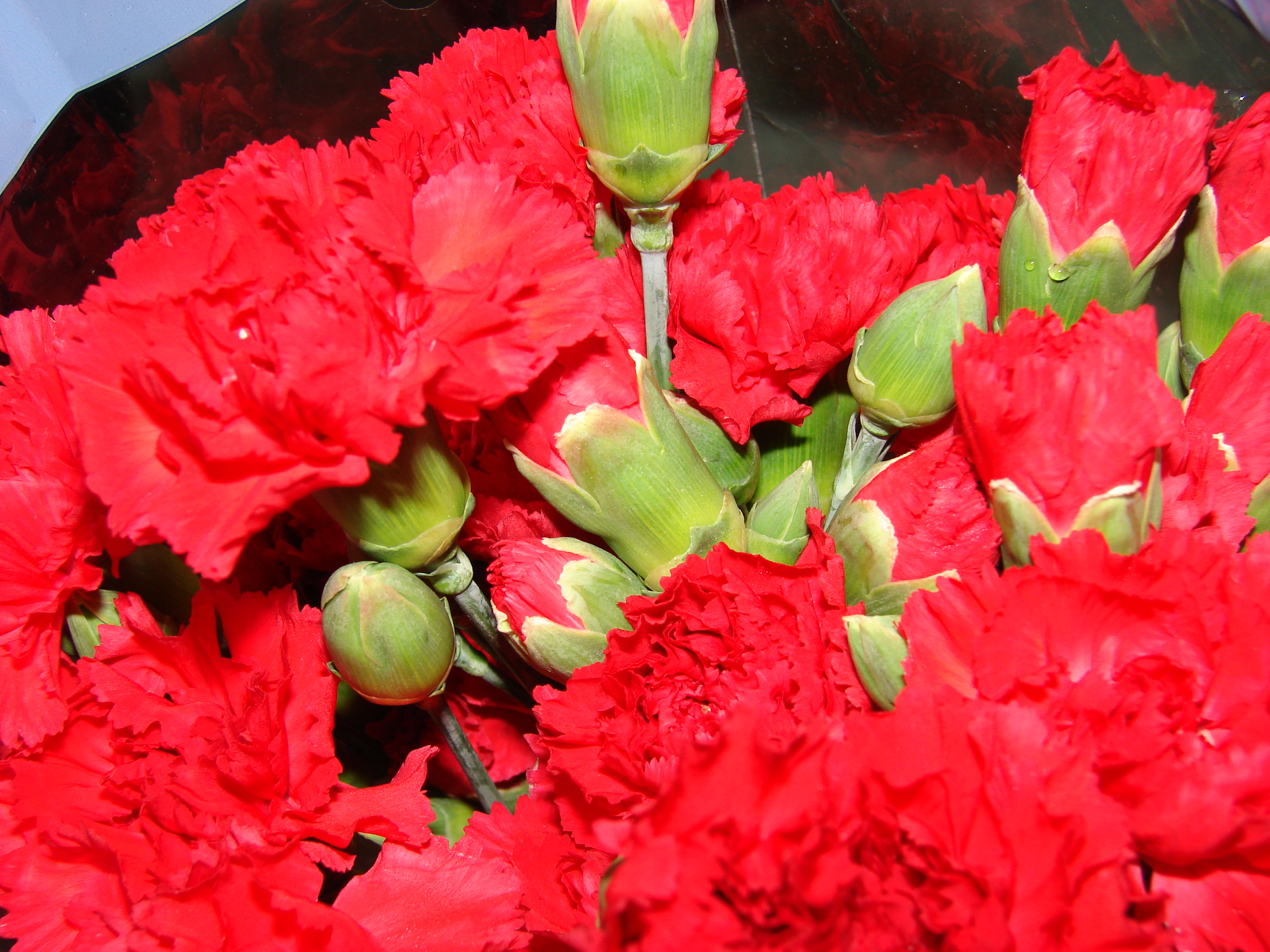
Dianthus caryophyllus

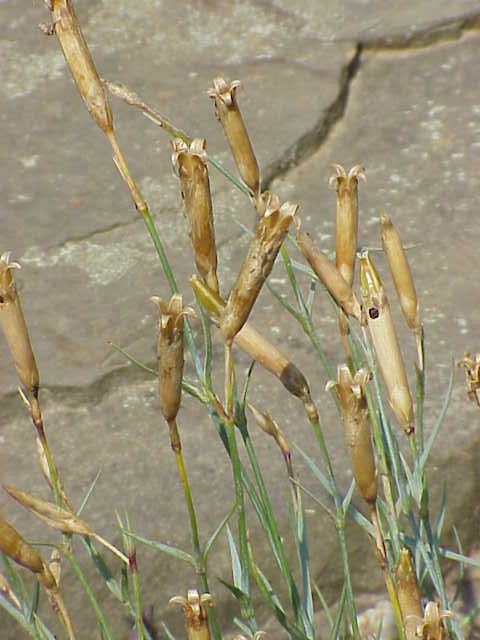
Dianthus caryophyllus seed heads

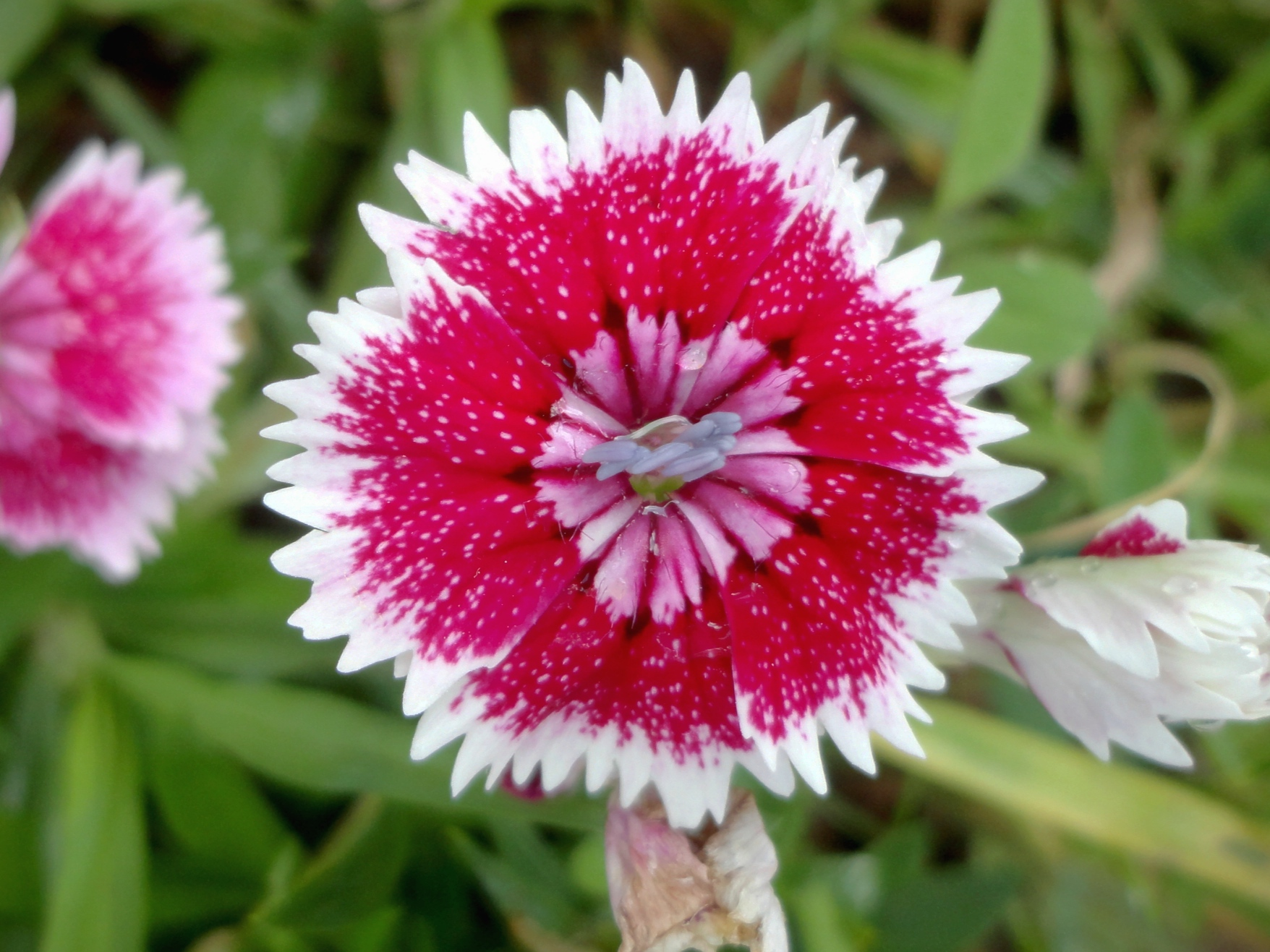
Hybrid Dianthus chinensis × barbatus

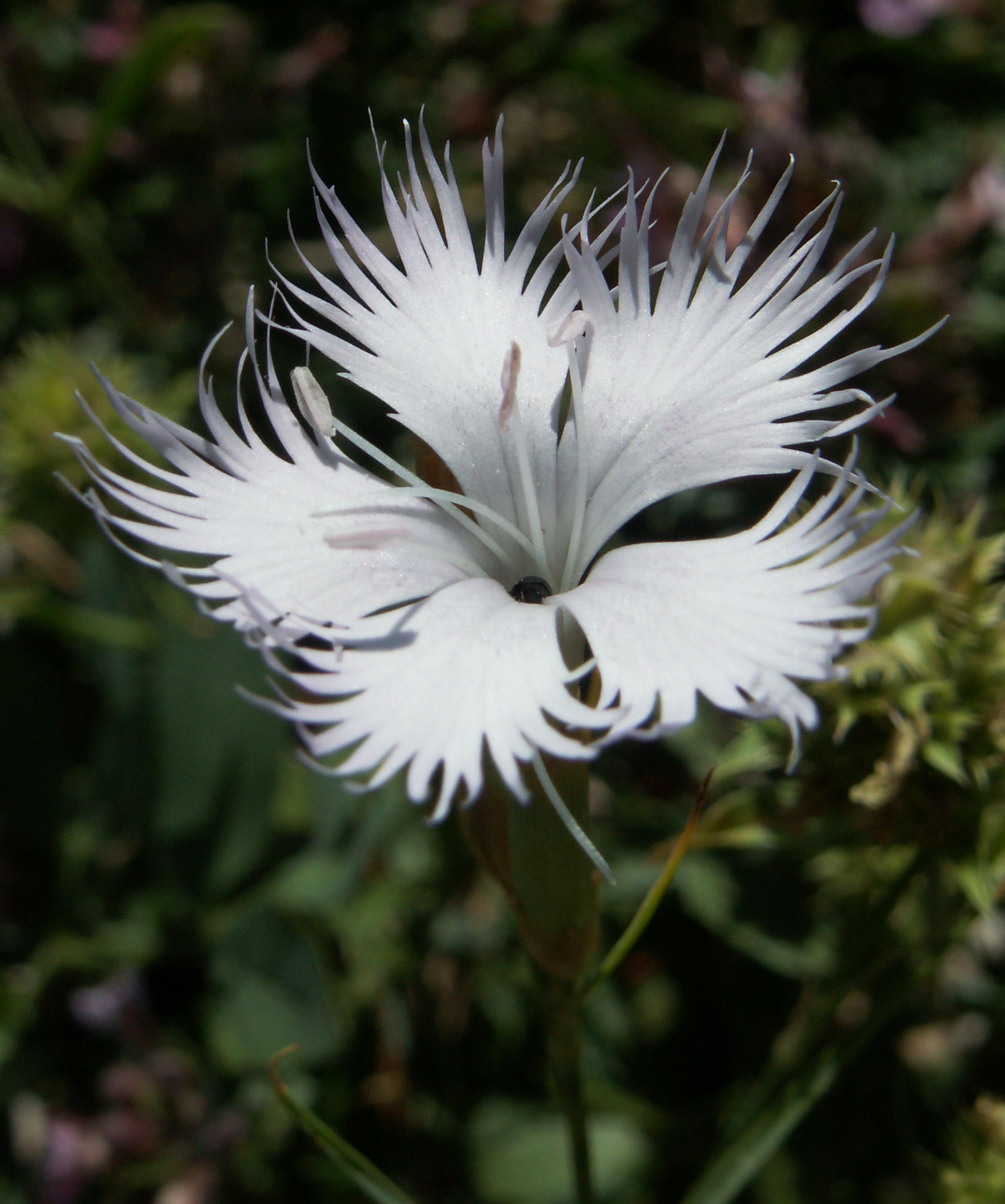
Dianthus monspessulanus

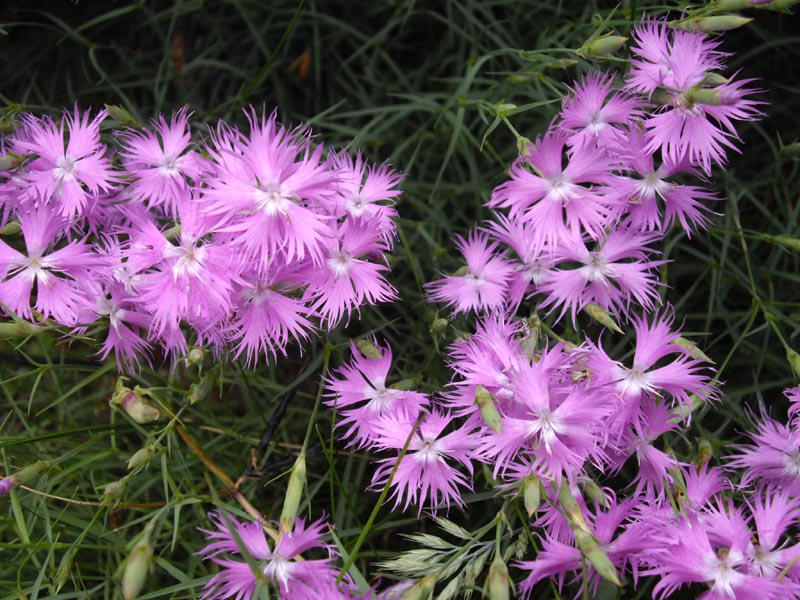
Carnation Dianthus monspessulanus

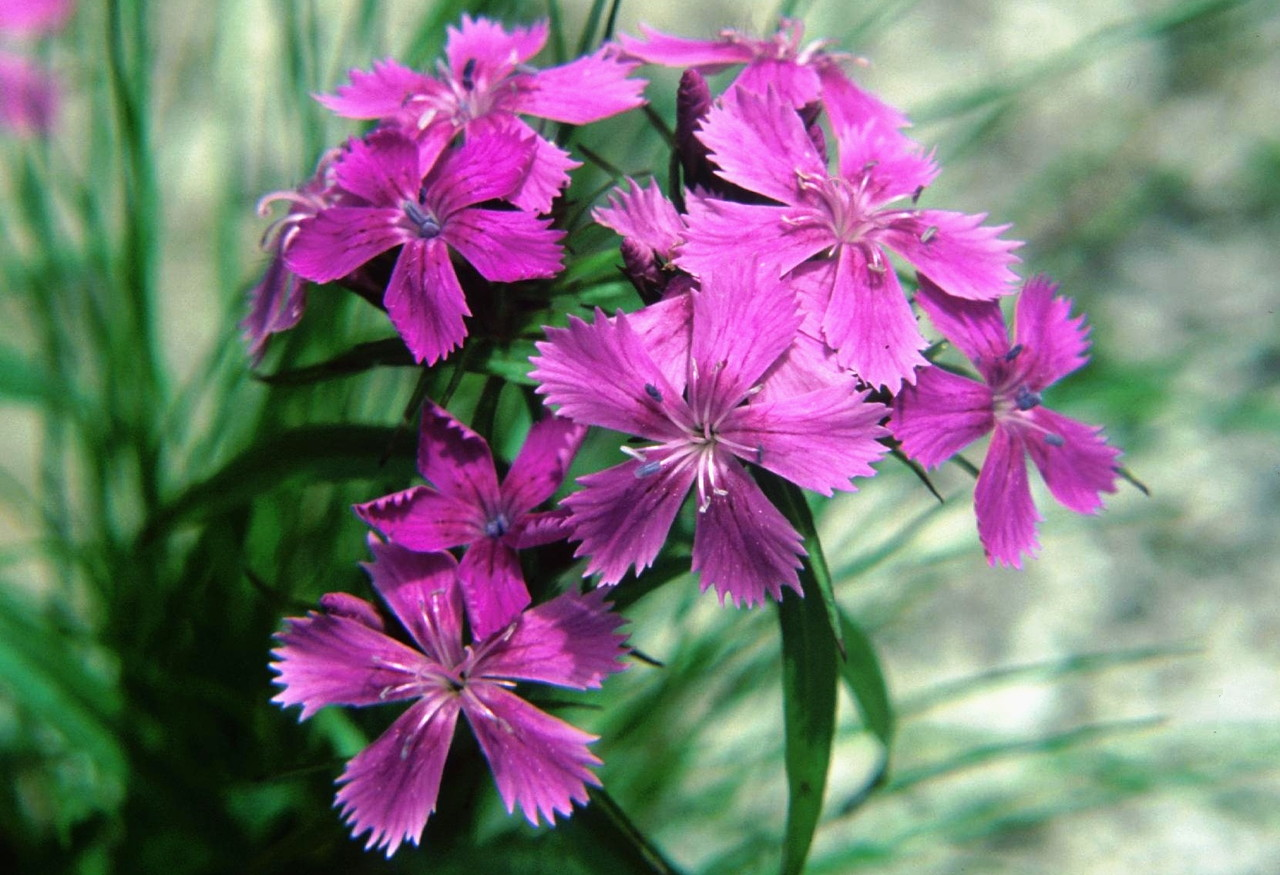
Dianthus shinanensis

== See also ==
- List of Award of Garden Merit dianthus
