= Râpa Roșie =

Protected area in Romania

Râpa Roșie National Reserve/Natural monument
- IUCN category III (natural monument or feature)
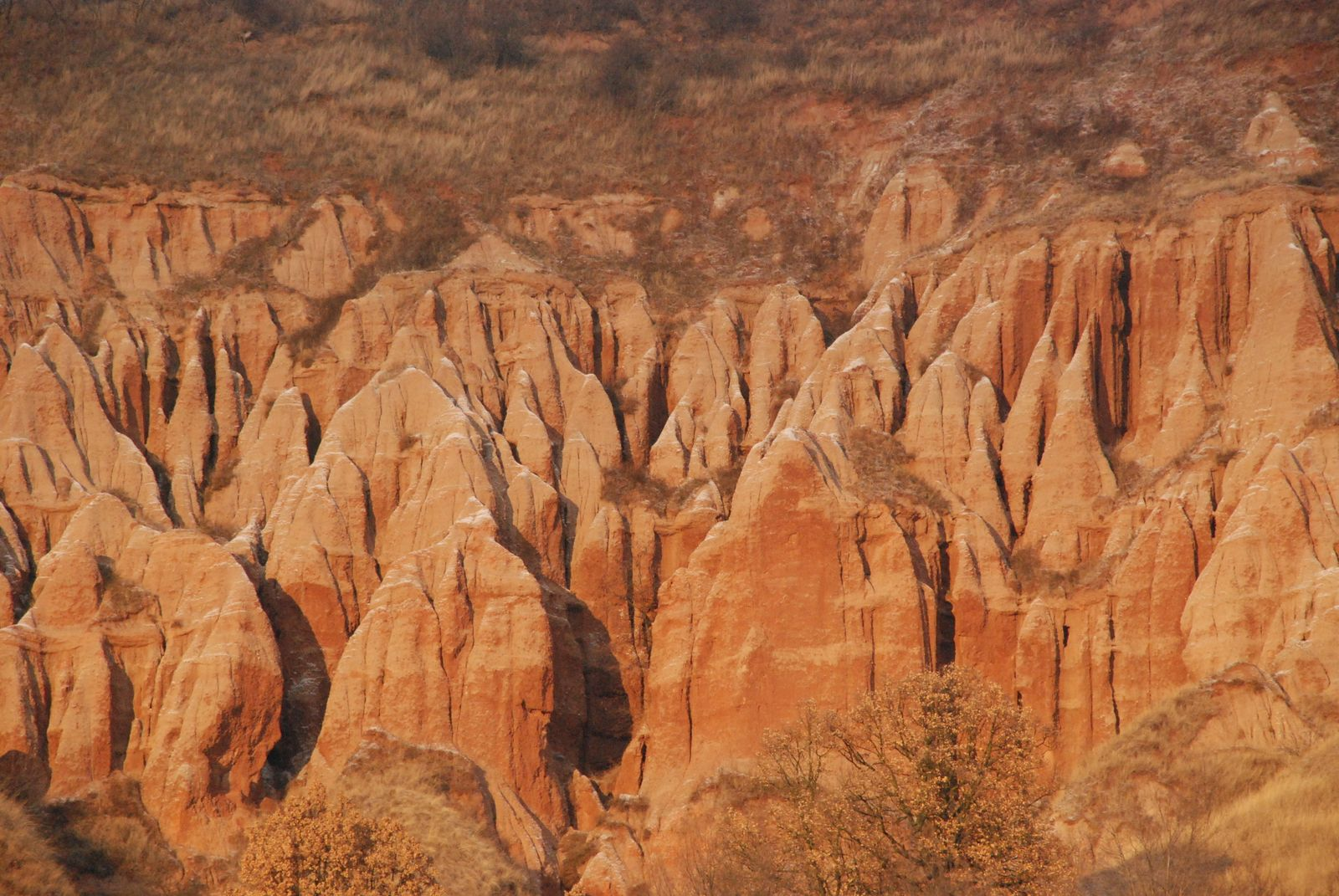
- Râpa Roșie Nature Reserve, a national geological monument

- Location within Romania
- Location: România
- Nearest city: Alba County; Sebeș
- Coordinates: 45°59′15″N 23°35′29″E
- Area: 24 ha (59 acres)
- Established: 2000 (1969)

Râpa Roșie (Romanian for "red ravine") is a protected area, a natural monument of national interest in Alba County, Romania. It is a geological and botanical reserve, located in the extreme southwest of the Secașelor Plateau, on the right bank of the river Secașul Mare, about 4 kilometres (2.5 mi) north of Sebeș. With a size of approximately 24 hectares (59 acres), the reserve is classified as IUCN Category III.

Erosion and runoff has given it a prominent, sharp rocky appearance in the mountainside. Râpa Roșie itself measures approximately 10 ha (25 acres) in size. Râpa Roșie stretches over a length of 800 metres (2,600 ft). Its height measures between 50–125 metres (164–410 ft) (300–425 metres (984–1,394 ft) absolute altitude). A huge wall, almost vertical, gives the impression of a ruined ancestral monument. Tiered columns and pyramids, separated by ravines, form a badlands microrelief.

The first report of a Coțofeni culture find at Râpa Roșie was made by Fr. W. Schuster in 1865. It was the first archaeological exploration made by him which revealed remnants of large and small pottery that had ornamentation, which also attested to the Coțofeni culture.

== Geology ==
Râpa Roșie is a geological reserve and a natural monument with unusual red bed features. Assessing the geological age of the formations has been a daunting task as no fossil remains had been found in the past.

The geological monument has been called a "natural wonder". Its walls rise to a height of 80–100 metres (260–330 ft). Rock formations are naturally carved with very unusual shapes of columns, towers and pyramids formed over centuries of erosion by rainwater. Study of the feature has revealed geological formations of gravel, quartz sands, and sandstones. The deposits are distinct "succession of red clays, grey and reddish soap-stones, friable white soap-stone". They all exhibit a reddish colour. Deep ravines are formed and during the rainy season the water flowing in the deep ravines is in the colour of the formation that is red; as the water falls into the ravines it makes a roaring sound. The Râpa Roșie River flows in the vicinity.

== Flora ==
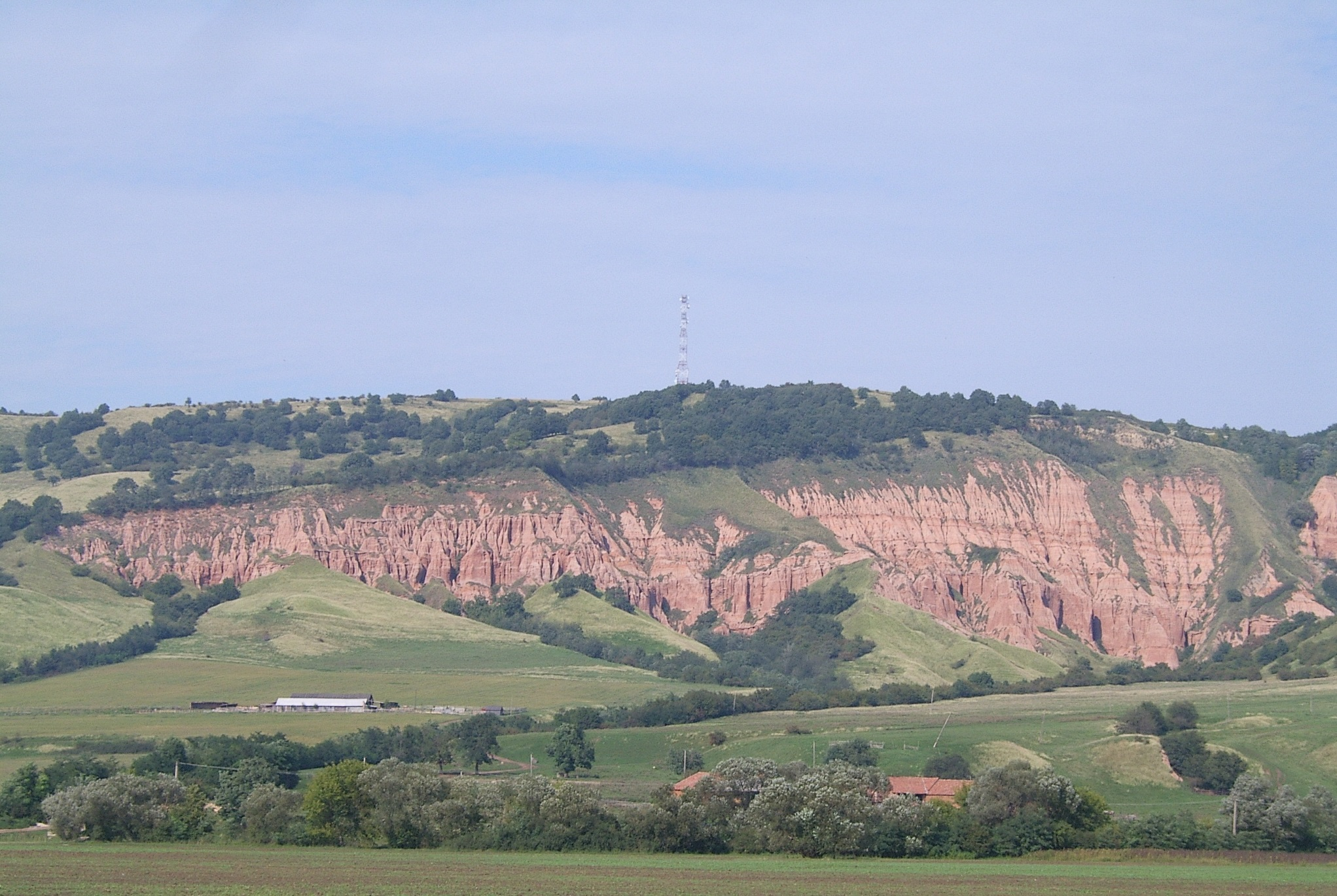
Râpa Roșie

There are many rare and endemic plants in the area. The floral species reported from the park are Cotoneaster integerrimus, Ephedra distachya, Centaurea atropurpurea, Dianthus serotinus, Cephalaria radiate, and Asplenium nigrum. To evolve a management plan for the natural reserve, a study was carried out on the flora and faunal resources within the reserve area. Given this data, the details of flora reported are 144 plant species of 41 families. Of these, 8 are endangered species which are characteristic to the ecoregion of the xerophilous grasslands and/or the Xerothermic subcontinental Oak forest, and are: Cephalaria radiate, Cephalaria uralensis, Onosma pseudoarenaria, Jurinea mollis ssp. (transsilvanica), Salvia transsilvanica, Salvia nutans, Centaurea atropurpurea and Quercus pubescens. In addition to the above, some rare plant species reported are Cotoneaster integerrimus, Centaurea atropurpurea, Dianthus serotinus, Cephalaria radiata and Asplenium adiantum-nigrum.

== Fauna ==
To draw up a management plan for the natural reserve, a study was carried out on the flora and faunal resources within the reserve area.

Avifauna

- Alauda arvensis (sky lark)
- Accipiter gentilis (goshawk)
- Aegithalos caudatus (long tailed tit)
- Buteo buteo (common buzzard)
- Carduelis carduelis (European goldfinch)
- Carduelis chloris (Greenfinch)
- Coccothraustes sp. (hawfinch)
- Corvus corax (raven)
- Corvus cornix (hooded crow)
- Circus cyaneus (hen harrier)
- Dendrocopos major (great spotted woodpecker)
- Erithacus rubecula (European robin)
- Fringilla coelebs (chaffinch)
- Falco tinnunculus (common kestrel)
- Garrulus glandarius (jay)
- Miliaria calandra (corn bunting)
- Parus caeruleus (blue tit)
- Parus major (great tit)
- Parus palustris (marsh tit)
- Passer domesticus (house sparrow)
- Passer montanus (tree sparrow)
- Phoenicurus ochruros (black redstart)
- Phylloscopus collybita (chiffchaff)
- Pica pica (magpie)
- Saxicola rubetra (whinchat)
- Sitta europaea (nuthatch)
- Strix aluco (tawny owl)
- Sturnus vulgaris (European starling)
- Troglodytes troglodytes (wren)
- Turdus philomelos (song thrush)
- Turdus merula (blackbird)

Amphibians

- Bombina variegate (yellow-bellied toad),
- Bombina bombina x variegate (hybrid forms between the yellow-bellied and the fire-bellied toad, Bombina bombina)
- Hyla arborea (common tree frog)
- Rana dalmatina (agile frog)

Reptile species

- Lacerta agilis (sand lizard),
- Lacerta viridis (green lizard),
- Podarcis muralis (common wall lizard),
- Anguis fragilis (slow-worm),
- Coronella austriaca(smooth snake)

== Paleontology ==
Paleontology investigations have been carried out at Râpa Roșie near Sebeș town, on the southwestern side of the Transylvanian Plateau. The investigations were started in 1969. Dinosaur bones were reported in earlier investigations. Based on the investigations carried out by Codrea and Dica in 2005, they have assigned the age of these formations to the Early Miocene age (also conjectured as of Eggenburgian-Ottnangian age). Some of the rare fossils found here are vertebrates; one of these is of sauropod caudal vertebra. This fossil's original source is interpreted as the underlying Șard Formation of the Maastrichtian-Priabonian, which has eroded over the years. Paleontologists involved with the studies at Râpa Roșie have opined that this is the only sauropod genus reported at any time in the latest Cretaceous Maastrichtian) formations in Romania, which could be stated as Magyarosaurus.
