= Island syndrome =

Set of phenotypical features likely to occur in geographically-isolated populations

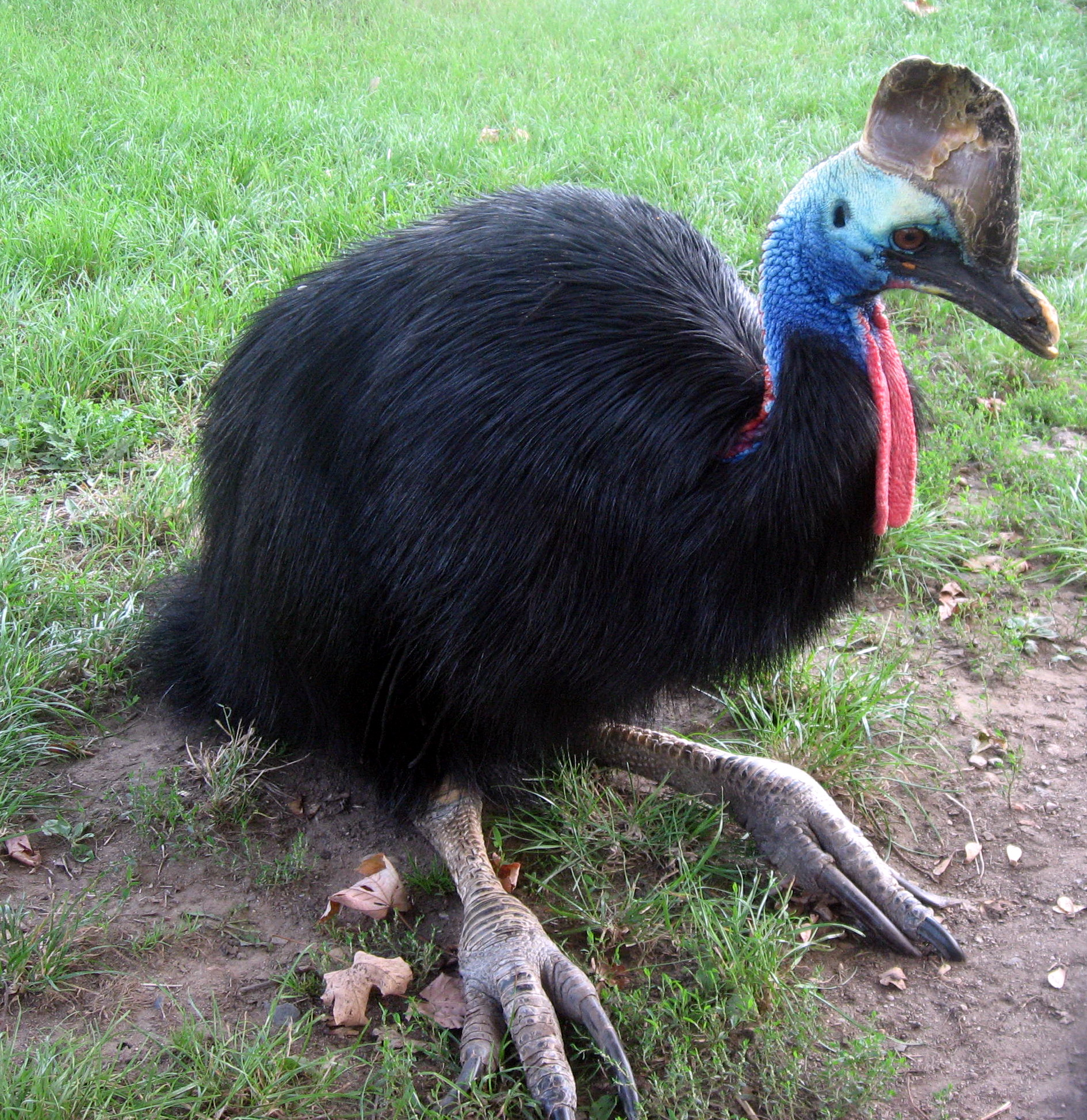
The southern cassowary, a ratite native to Indonesia, New Guinea and northeastern Australia which exhibits island gigantism and sexually monomorphic plumage, both features of island syndrome

Island syndrome describes the differences in morphology, ecology, physiology and behaviour of insular species compared to their continental counterparts. These differences evolve due to the different ecological pressures affecting insular species, including a paucity of large predators and herbivores as well as a consistently mild climate.

== Ecological driving factors ==
- Reduced predation. Island ecosystems cannot support a sufficient biomass of prey in order to accommodate large predators. This largely relieves prey species of the risk of predation, which mostly removes the selection pressure for morphologies, ecologies and behaviours that help to evade large predators.
- Reduced biodiversity. Insular ecosystems tend to comprise large populations of a limited number of species (a state termed density compensation), therefore, they exhibit low biodiversity. This results in reduced interspecific competition and increased intraspecific competition.
- Reduced sexual selection. There is also reduced sexual selection in insular species, which is especially prominent in birds which lose their sexually dimorphic plumage used in sexual displays.
- Reduced parasite diversity. Finally, there is reduced parasite diversity in insular ecosystems which reduces the level of selection acting on immune-related genes.

== Features of island syndrome in animals ==
=== Body size ===
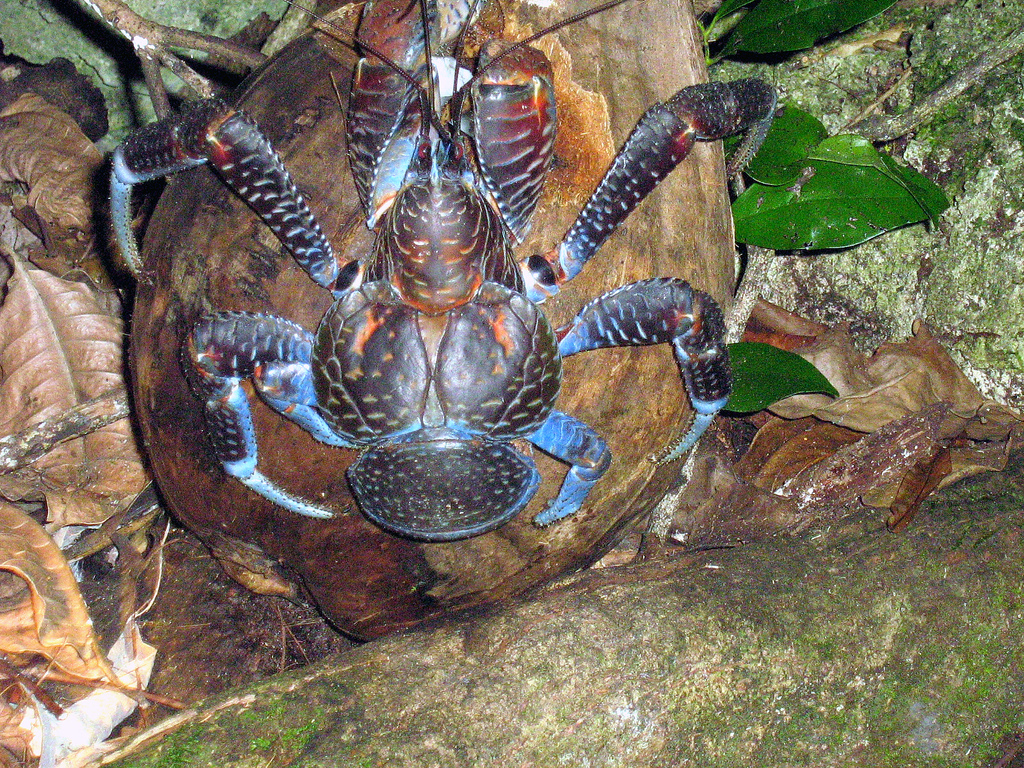
A coconut crab, an example of insular gigantism. It is placed atop a coconut for size comparison

Interspecific competition between continental species drives divergence of body size so that species may avoid high levels of competition by occupying distinct niches. Reduced interspecific competition between insular species reduces this selection pressure for species to occupy distinct niches. As a result, there is less diversity in the body size of insular species. Typically small mammals increase in size (for example, fossa are larger insular relatives of the mongoose) while typically large mammals decrease in size (for example, the Malagasy hippopotamuses are smaller insular relatives of continental hippopotamuses). These are examples of insular gigantism and insular dwarfism respectively. This observed effect is called Foster's rule. Conversely, birds and reptiles tend to exhibit insular gigantism, exemplified by the moa, cassowary and Komodo dragon.

Although the giant tortoises of the Galápagos Islands and the Seychelles (the Galápagos tortoise and Aldabrachelys respectively) are sometimes given as examples of insular gigantism, they are now thought to represent the last remaining populations of historically widespread giant tortoises. The remains of tortoises of similar or larger size have been found in Australia (Meiolania), southern Asia (Megalochelys), Madagascar (Aldabrachelys), North America (Hesperotestudo) and South America (Chelonoidis). The extant giant tortoises are thought to persist only in a few remote archipelagos because humans arrived there relatively late and have not heavily predated them, suggesting that these tortoise populations have been less subjected to overexploitation.

=== Wing reduction or loss ===
Since insular prey species experience a reduced risk of predation, they often lose or reduce morphologies utilised in predator evasion. For example, the wings of weevils, rails and pigeons have become so reduced in insular species that many have lost the ability to fly. This has occurred in several ratites including the kiwi and the cassowary as well as in the dodo and the kakapo after invading island habitats. The extinct moa of New Zealand exhibits the most extreme known example of insular wing reduction; there is no osseous evidence of even vestigial wings and the pectoral girdle is reduced to a scapulocoracoideum which would be unable to bear a forelimb as it lacks a glenoid fossa. Therefore, it is the only bird known to have completely lost its wings after a shift to insularity. Loss of flight allows birds to eliminate the costs of maintaining large flight-enabling muscles like the pectoral muscles and allows the skeleton to become heavier and stronger. Insular populations of barn owl have shorter wings, representing a transitional stage in which their capacity for flight is being reduced.

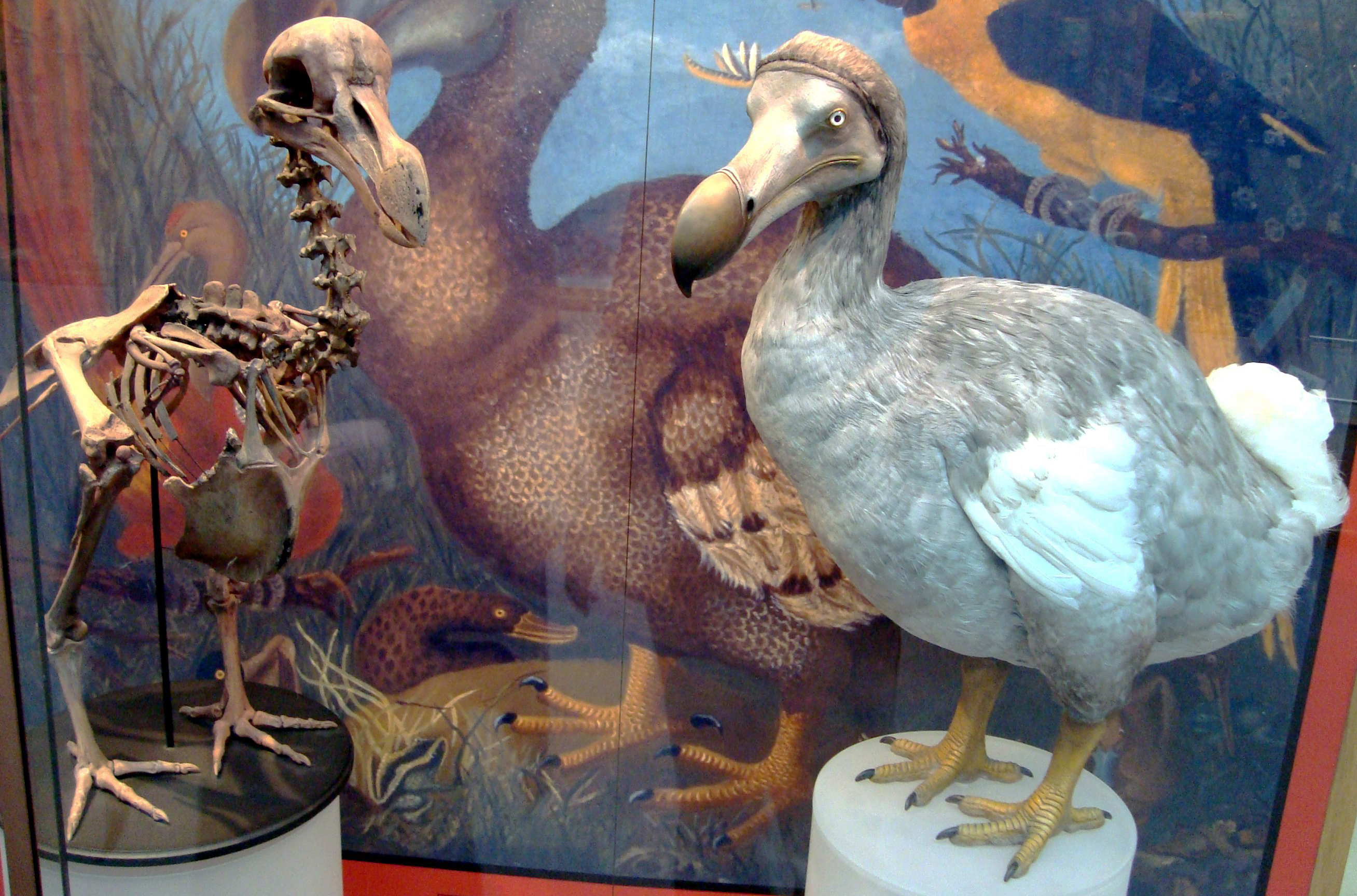
Skeleton and model of the dodo, an extinct flightless bird from Mauritius

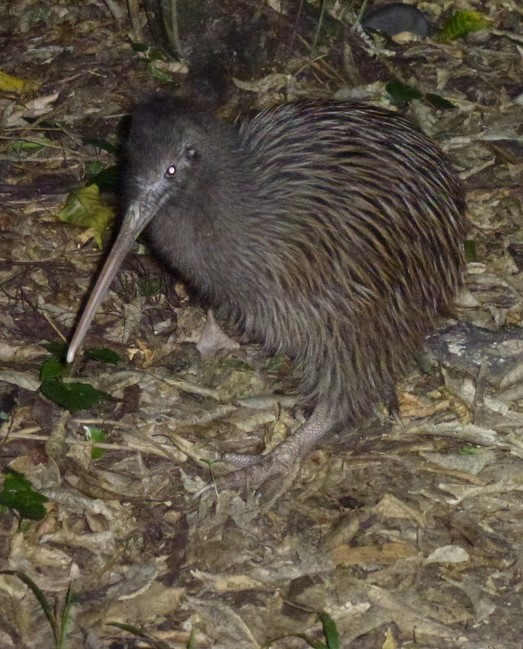
The Okarito kiwi, a small flightless ratite native to the South Island of New Zealand

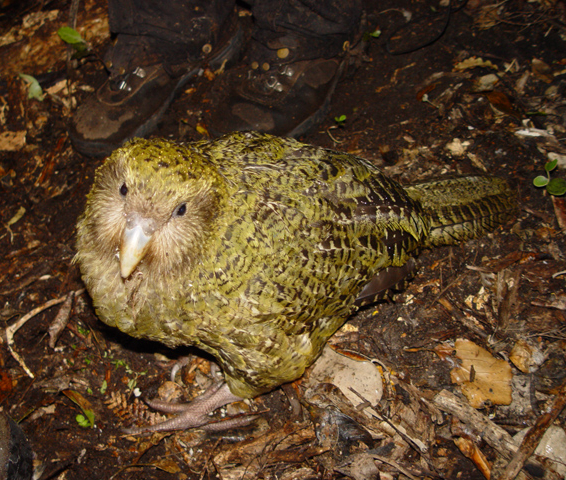
The kakapo, a large flightless parrot endemic to New Zealand

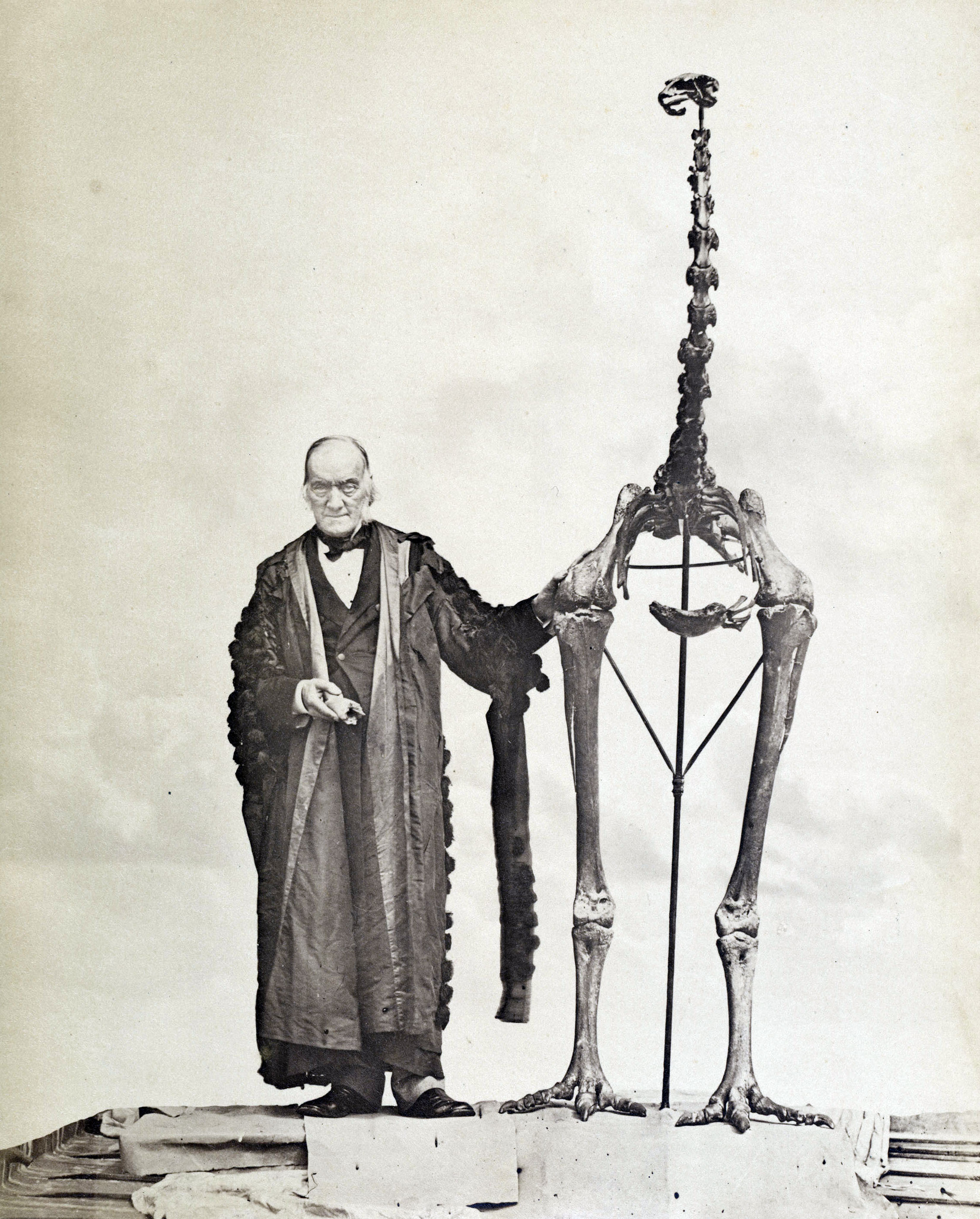
Skeleton of the extinct moa from New Zealand alongside Richard Owen. Moa exhibited insular gigantism, small brain size and complete loss of wings including the stylopod element.

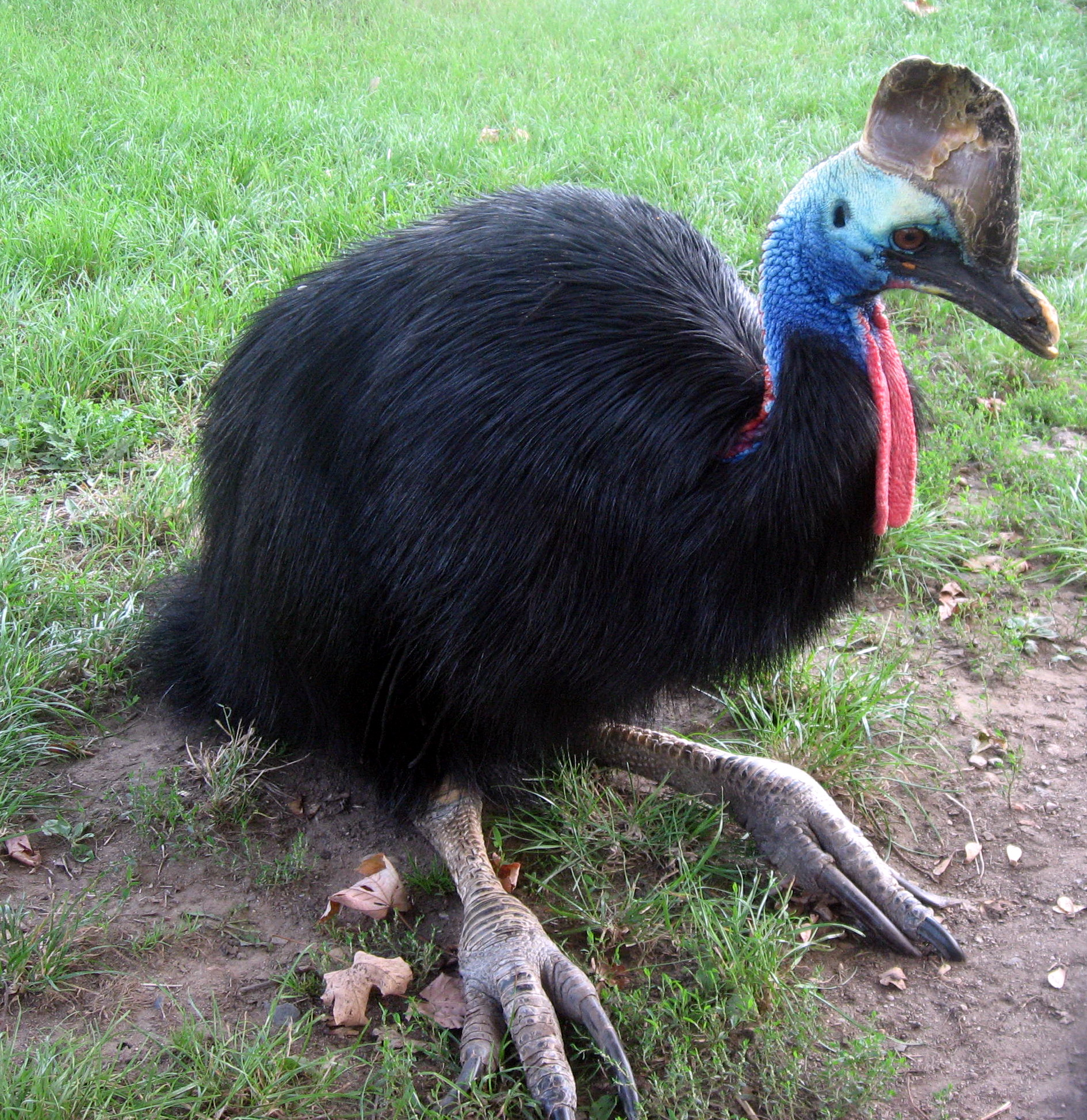
The southern cassowary, a flightless ratite native to Indonesia, New Guinea and northeastern Australia

=== Adaptive coloration ===
Due to the reduced sexual selection of insular species, they tend to exhibit reduced sexual coloration so as to conserve the energy that this demands. Additionally, the low biodiversity of insular ecosystems makes species recognition less important so species-specific coloration is under less selection. As a result, insular bird species often exhibit duller, sexually monomorphic plumage.

Several insular species acquire increased melanin colouration. Male white-winged fairywrens living on mainland Australia exhibit a blue nuptial plumage, whereas two island subspecies (Malurus leucopterus leucopterus from Dirk Hartog Island and Malurus leucopterus edouardi from Barrow Island) exhibit a black nuptial plumage. A subspecies of the chestnut-bellied monarch endemic to the Solomon Islands, Monarcha castaneiventris obscurior, exhibits polymorphism in plumage color: some birds are black with a chestnut-colored belly while others are completely melanic. The frequency of the melanic phenotype increases on smaller islands, even when the relative proximity of the islands is accounted for.

=== Reproduction ===
High levels of intraspecific competition between offspring selects for the very fittest individuals. As a result, insular parents tend to produce fewer offspring so that each offspring receives greater parental investment, maximising their fitness. Lizards endemic to island ecosystems lay smaller clutches that give larger offspring compared to continental lizards of a similar size. Because of increased frequency of laying in insular lizards, continental and insular lizards produced offspring at a comparable rate.

=== Brain size ===
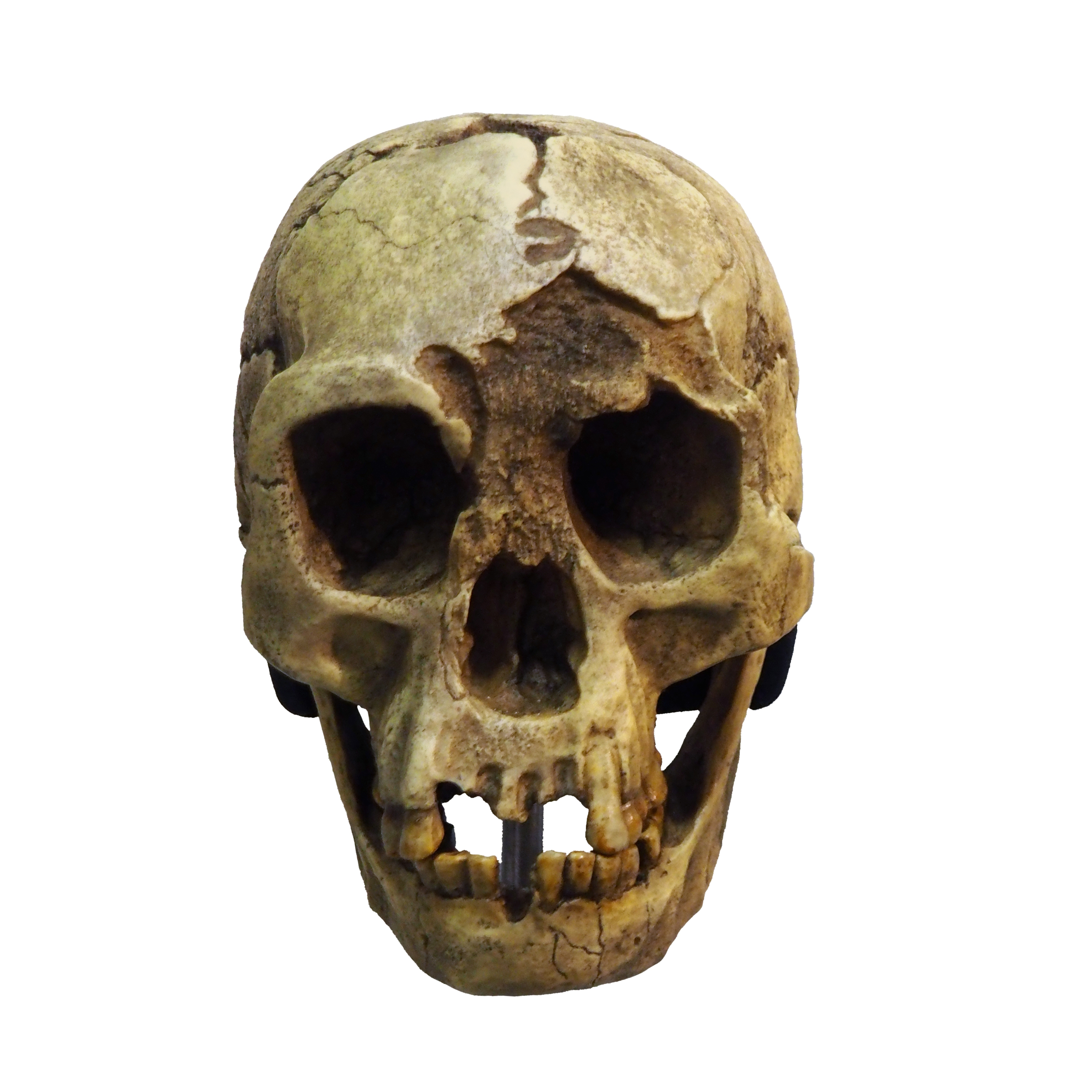
Homo floresiensis skull demonstrating the reduced neurocranium

The expensive tissue hypothesis suggests that tissues with a high metabolic demand like the brain will become reduced if they confer little selective advantage and so do not help to increase food intake. The paucity of large predators means that insular species can afford to become slower and less alert without suffering from massively increased predation risk. As such, reduction in relative brain size is often seen in insular species as this reduces basal metabolic rate without increases in predation risk. For example, the endocranial volume of the extinct Malagasy dwarf hippos is 30% less than that of an equally sized continental ancestor. Similarly, the early human, Homo floresiensis, had a brain of similar size to that of the significantly earlier Australopithecus specimens from mainland Africa and 3.4 times smaller than that of Homo sapiens which evolved later (see Evolution of human brain size).

=== Poikilothermy ===
Due to low predation risk, insular prey species can afford to reduce their basal metabolic rate by adopting poikilothermy without any significant increase in predation risk. As a result, poikilothermy is far more common in island species.

=== Behaviour ===
Due to lack of predation, insular species tend to become more docile and less territorial than their continental counterparts (sometimes referred to as island tameness). Deer mice, song sparrows and bronze anoles all have smaller territories with greater overlap compared to their mainland conspecifics. They are also more tolerant to intruders. Falkland Island foxes and tammar wallabies have both lost an innate fear of large predators including humans.

== In parasites ==
The nematode parasite Heligmosomoides polygyrus underwent niche expansion (by invading new host species) and a reduction in genetic diversity after invading ecosystems in seven western Mediterranean islands. The loss of genetic diversity was related to the distance between the contemporal population and the mainland origin.

== In plants ==
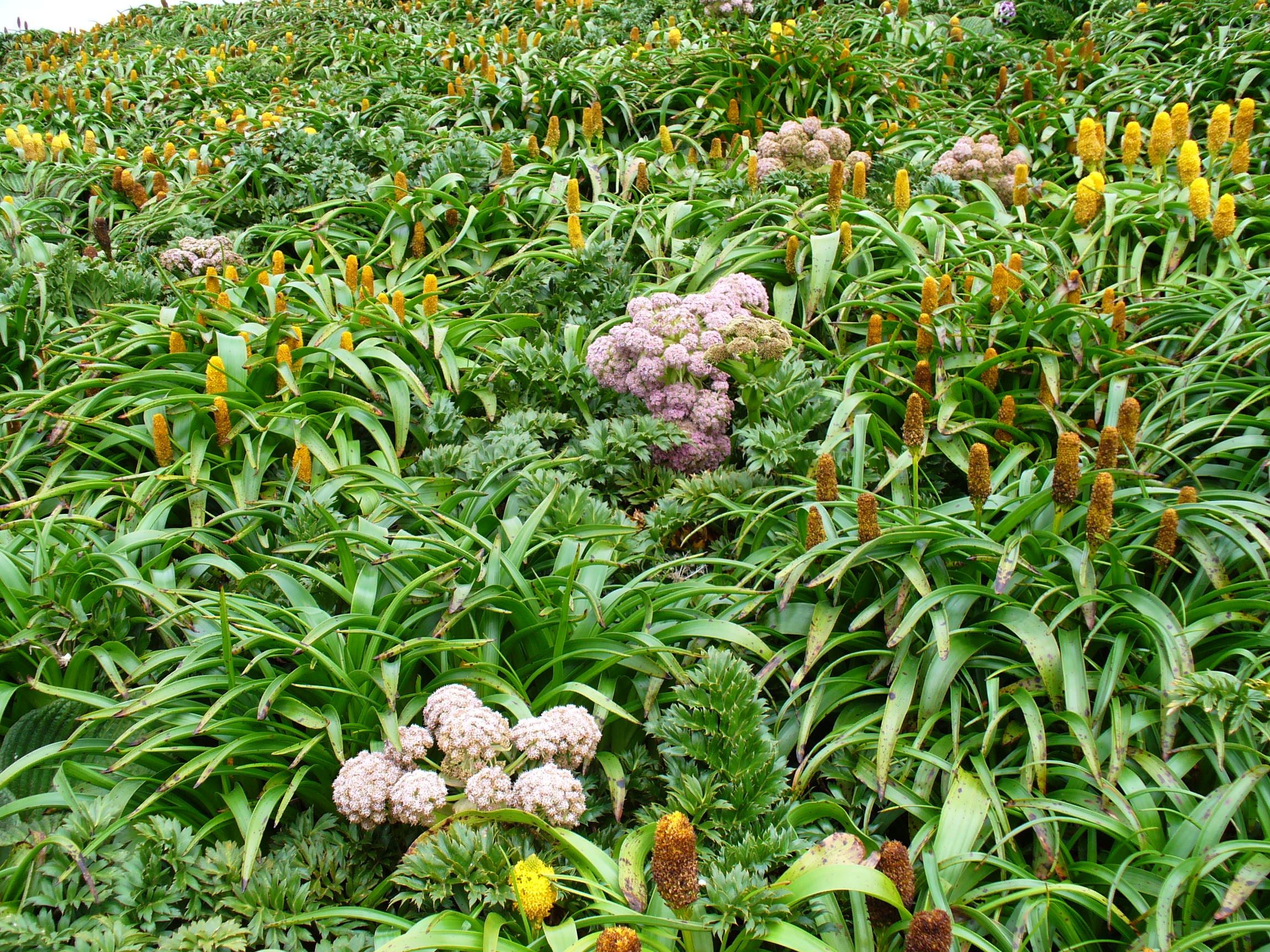
A megaherb community of Ross lilies and Campbell Island carrots exhibit yellow and pink flowers respectively to attract alternate pollinators. They both exhibit insular gigantism.

=== Plant structure ===
Plant stature and leaf area both follow the pattern of insular mammals, with small species becoming larger and large species becoming smaller in island populations. This may be due to reduced interspecific competition which would decrease the ecological drive for plants to occupy separate niches. Due to reduced biomass of large herbivores, several island plants lose protective spines and thorns as well as decreasing the amounts of defensive chemicals produced. The improbability of island fires also results in a loss of fire-resistance in bark, fruits and cones. Insular woodiness, the evolutionary transition from herbaceousness toward woodiness, is a very common phenomenon among island floras.

=== Reproduction and dispersal ===
Due to a lack of dedicated pollinators on remote islands, insular plants often use small, inconspicuously colored and easily accessible flowers to attract a range of alternative pollinator species. Self-pollination is also more commonly used by insular plant species, as pollen does not have to travel so far to reach a receptive ovule or stigma. Seeds exhibit insular gigantism, becoming predominantly larger than mainland seeds, which is thought to improve mortality at sea during dispersal.

== Consequences of island syndrome for conservation ==
The relaxed predation risk in island ecosystems has resulted in the loss of several adaptations and behaviours that act to evade or discourage predation. This makes insular species particularly vulnerable to exploitation by alien species. For example, when humans first introduced dogs, pigs, cats, rats, and crab-eating macaques to the island of Mauritius in the 17th century, they plundered dodo nests and increased interspecies competition for the limited food resources. This ultimately resulted in the dodo's extinction. The limited resources in island ecosystems are also vulnerable to overexploitation if they are not managed sustainably.

== Hațeg Island ==
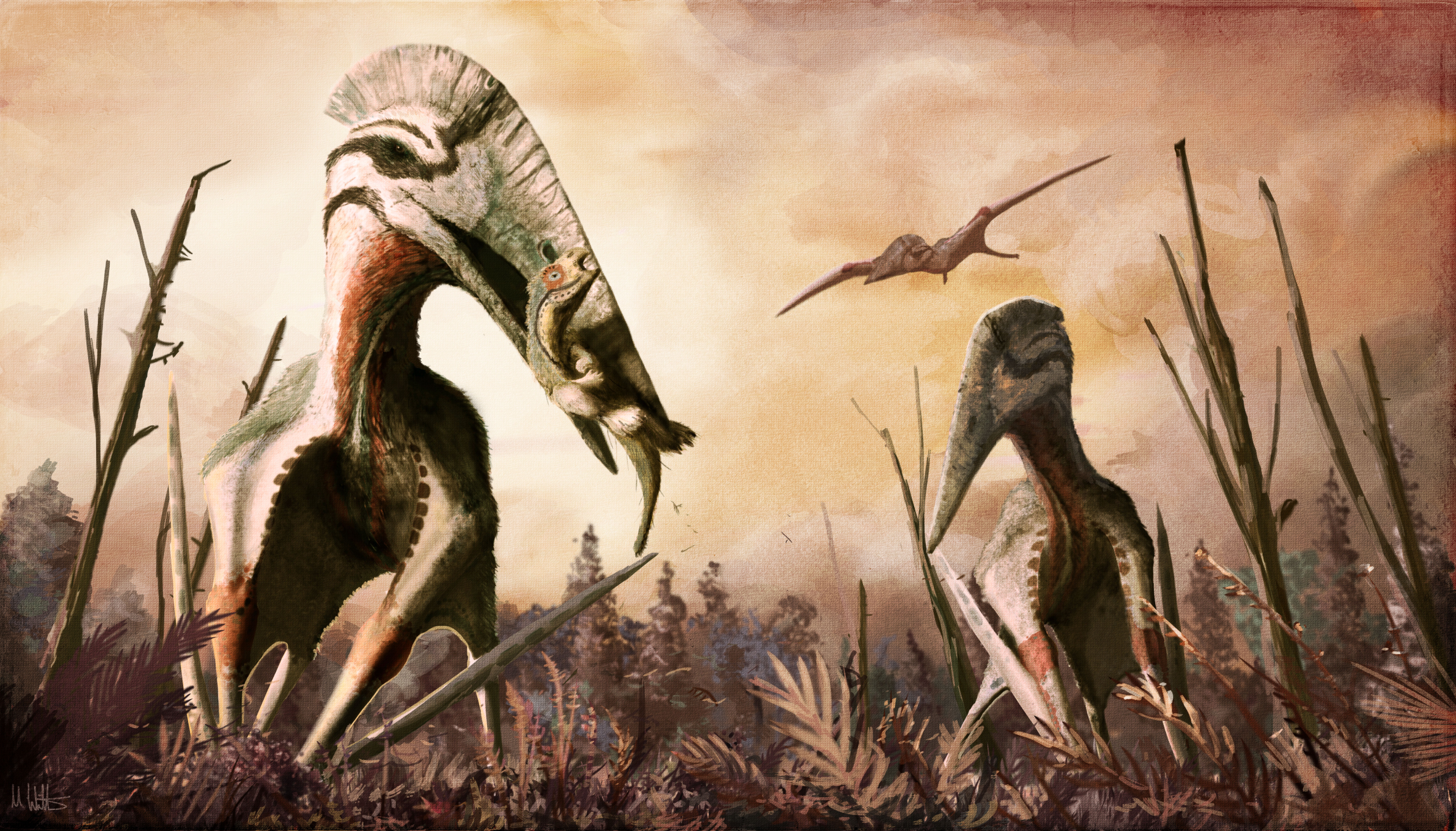
Hatzegopteryx was the apex predator of Hațeg island and one of the largest pterosaurs to have ever lived, pictured hunting Zalmoxes.

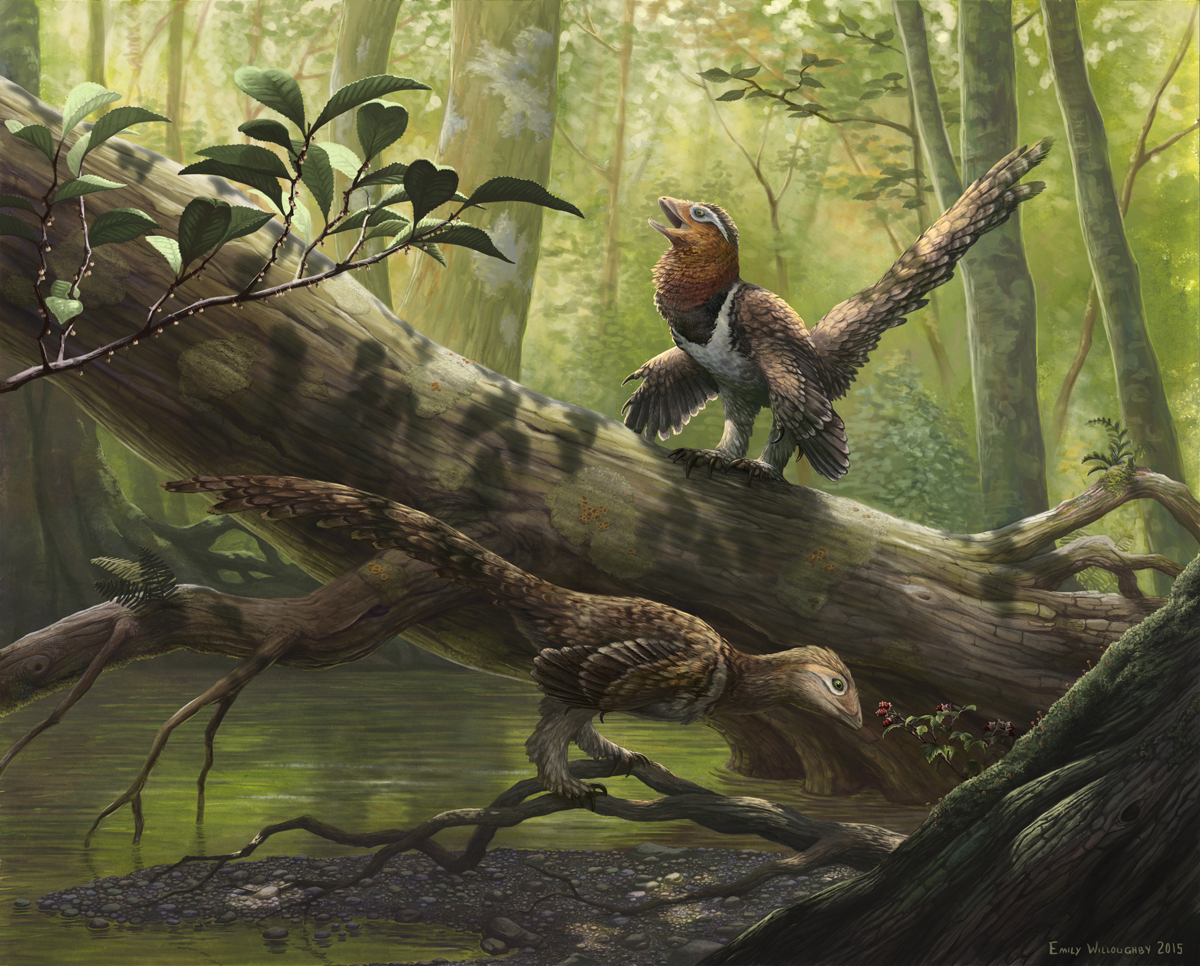
The basal avialan Balaur bondoc, which resembles dromaeosaurid dinosaurs due to its shorter, stockier forelimbs.

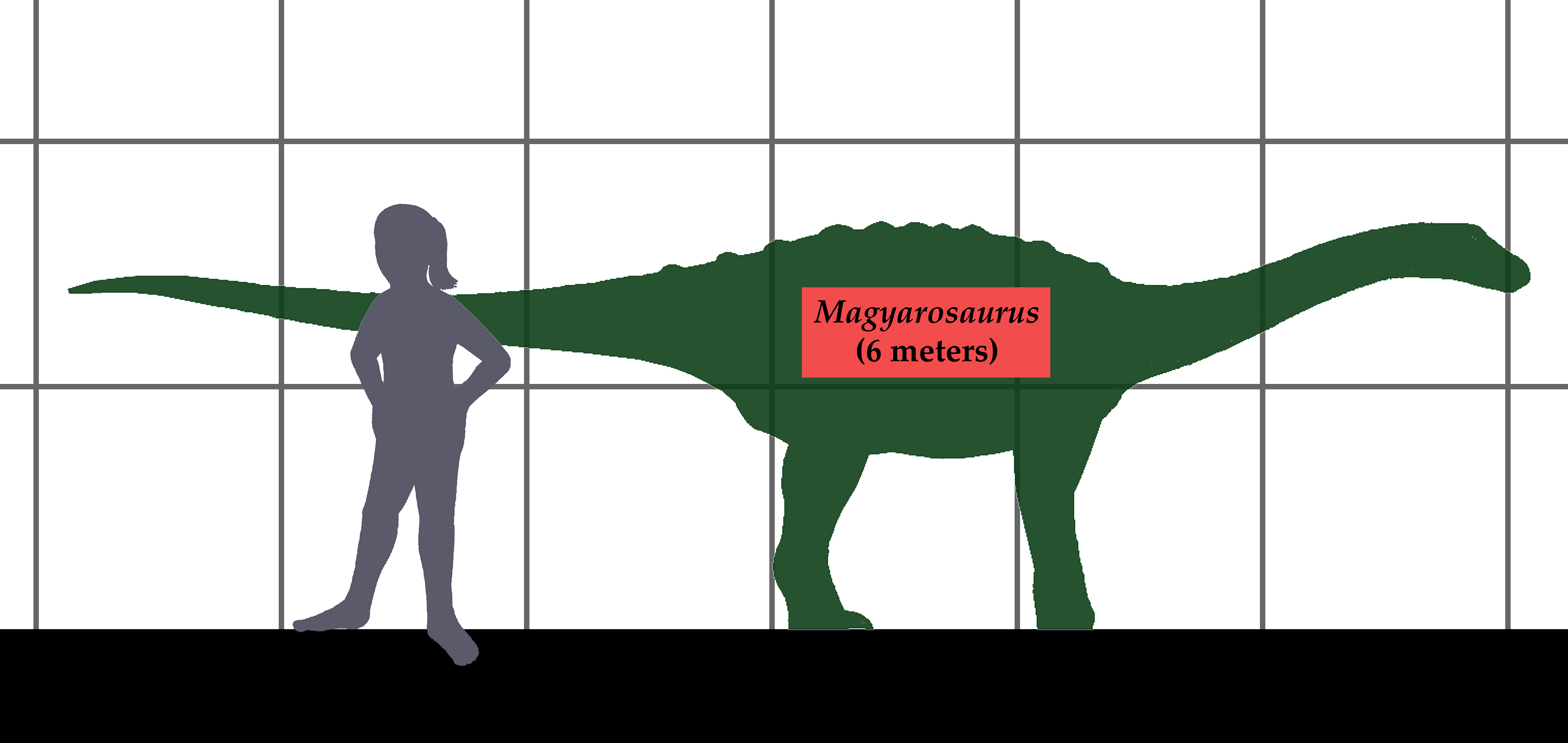
Size comparison of the dwarf titanosaur, Magyarosaurus dacus, and a human

Hațeg Island was a large offshore island in the Tethys Sea of the Late Cretaceous and is often called "The Island of the Dwarf Dinosaurs" on account of the extensive fossil evidence that its native dinosaurs exhibited island dwarfism. The island's native titanosaur, Magyarosaurus dacus, had a body mass of only 900 kilograms (2,000 lb) while mainland titanosaurs like Patagotitan could reach up to 69 tonnes (76 tons). The pterosaur Hatzegopteryx took over the position of apex predator of Hațeg Island in the absence of any hypercarnivorous dinosaurs and likely hunted juvenile dwarf dinosaurs or even adults of the smaller species. Based on its robust jaw and cervical vertebrae, Hatzegopteryx is thought to have hunted in a similar manner to modern storks by attacking prey that are too large to swallow whole. Its wingspan is estimated to have reached up to 10 to 12 metres (33 to 39 ft), making it one of the largest pterosaurs to have ever lived. As such, it is a potent example of island gigantism, in this case to fill the otherwise empty niche of apex predator. Balaur bondoc was originally classified as a dromaeosaurid dinosaur based on its retractable toe claws. Its forelimbs appeared to be too short and stocky for it to be a basal avialan, however, phylogenetic analysis later confirmed that Balaur was indeed a basal member of Avialae, a clade that includes modern birds. Its limbs were clearly incapable of powered flight and so Balaur is yet another example of the secondary loss of flight after invading an island niche, similar to ratites as well as the extinct moa and the dodo (See Wing reduction or loss).

== Reversed island syndrome ==
The term "reversed island syndrome" (RIS) was first used by Pasquale Raia in 2010 to describe the differences in morphology, ecology, physiology and behaviour observed in insular species when population density is either low or fluctuating. This results in stronger natural selection and weaker intraspecific selection, leading to different phenotypes compared to the standard island syndrome.

RIS was first described in a population of Italian wall lizard endemic to the Licosa Islet where the unpredictable environmental conditions and highly fluctuating population density have selected for aggressive behaviour and increased reproductive effort. The male lizards exhibit elevated α-MSH levels relative to mainland populations, which increases the basal metabolic rate, strengthens immune responses, produces darker blue coloration and raises 5α-dihydrotestosterone levels. The latter improves male reproductive success by increasing the likelihood of winning sexual conflicts over females and augmenting sperm quality. Females produce similar numbers of eggs compared to mainland populations but the eggs of insular females are significantly heavier, reflecting increased reproductive effort. The unpredictable conditions produce high mortality rates so adults invest more effort into current broods since they are less likely to survive to produce subsequent broods i.e. there is low interbrood conflict.

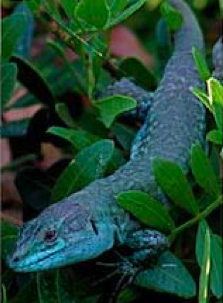
The insular subspecies of Italian wall lizard, Podarcis siculus klemmeri, exhibits darker blue coloration.

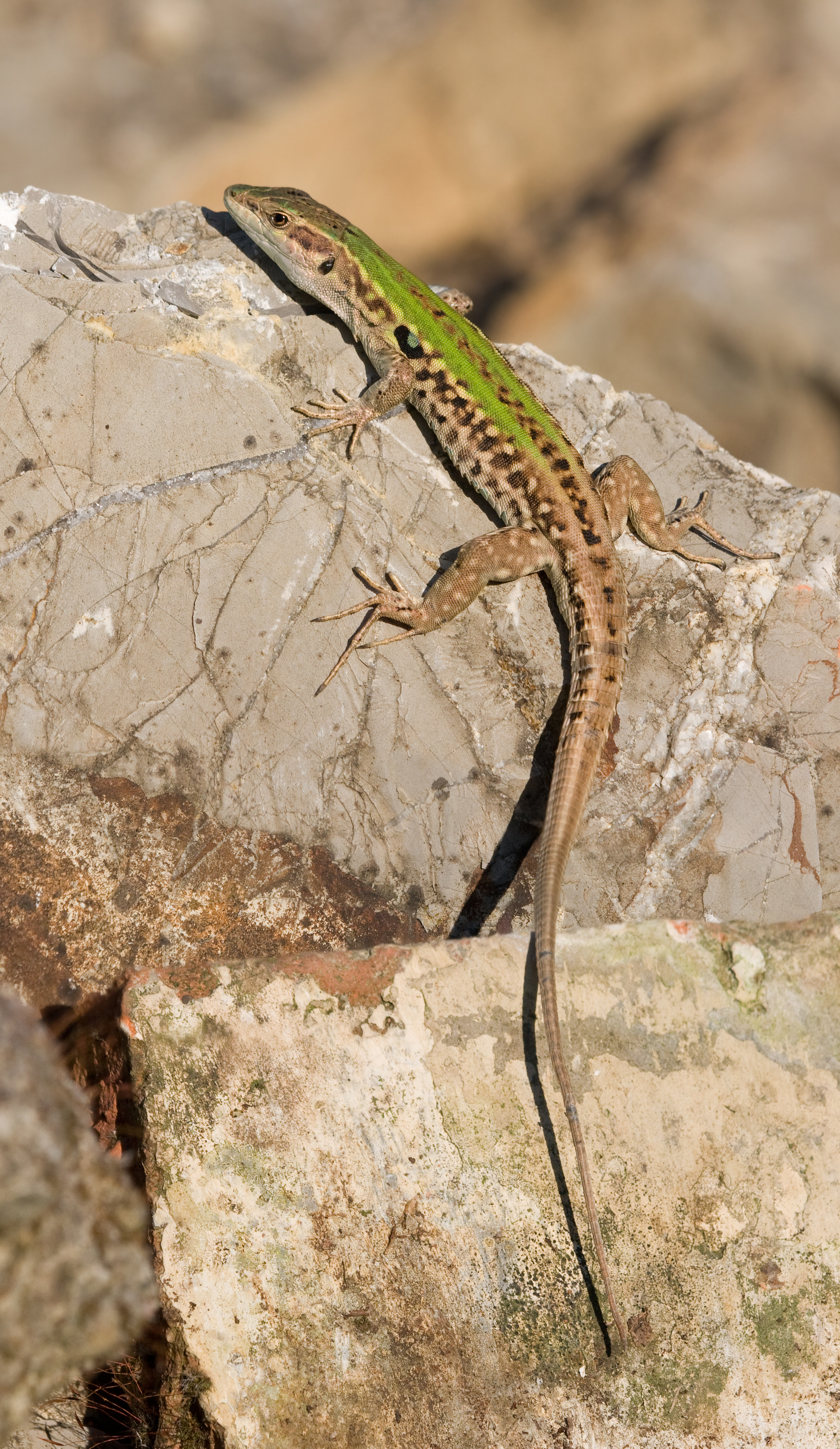
A mainland phenotype of Italian wall lizard with a lighter green-brown coloration

== See also ==
- Island ecology
