= Island ecology =

Study of island organisms and their interactions with each other and the environment

Island ecology is the study of island organisms and their interactions with each other and the environment. Islands account for nearly 1/6 of earth's total land area, yet the ecology of island ecosystems is vastly different from that of mainland communities. Their isolation and high availability of empty niches lead to increased speciation. As a result, island ecosystems comprise 30% of the world's biodiversity hotspots, 50% of marine tropical diversity, and some of the most unusual and rare species. Many species still remain unknown.

The diversity of species on islands is highly impacted by human activities such as deforestation and the introduction of exotic species. In response, ecologists and managers are directing attention towards conservation and restoration of island species. Because they are simple systems, islands provide an opportunity to study processes of extinction that can be extrapolated to larger ecosystems.

== Ecological processes on islands ==
Islands are attractive sites for ecological research because they provide clear examples of evolution in action. They show interesting patterns of colonization, adaptation, and speciation.

=== Colonization and establishment ===
Islands are surrounded by water, and may or may not exist as part of a continental land mass. Oceanic islands arise due to volcanic activity or reef growth, and usually subside over time due to erosion and changing sea levels. When islands emerge, they undergo the process of ecological succession as species colonize the island (see theory of island biogeography). New species cannot immigrate via land, and instead must arrive via air, water, or wind. As a result, organisms with high dispersal capabilities, such as plants and birds, are much more common on islands than are poorly dispersing taxa like mammals. However, some mammals are present on islands, presumably from swimming or riding on natural "rafts" that are washed away from the mainland.

Of the species that arrive, only some will be able to survive and establish populations. As a result, islands have fewer species than mainland habitats. Island populations are small and exhibit low genetic variability (see founder effect), but are isolated from the predators and competitors that they initially evolved with. This can lead to a process called ecological release, where a species is released from its ancestral community interactions and then colonizes new niches.

=== Adaptation ===
In response to these changing ecological pressures, island species can become much more docile than their mainland counterparts, and may grow larger (see island gigantism) or smaller (see island dwarfism). Some of these unique adaptations are reflected in charismatic island species such as the Malagasy hippopotamus, Komodo dragon, or pygmy mammoths. Although, the giant tortoises of the Galápagos Islands and the Seychelles (the Galápagos tortoise and Aldabrachelys respectively) are sometimes given as examples of insular gigantism, they are now thought to represent the last remaining populations of historically widespread giant tortoises i.e. gigantism is an ancestral trait that occurred in the absence of insular selection pressures. The collection of differences in morphology, ecology, physiology and behaviour of insular species compared to their continental counterparts is termed Island syndrome.

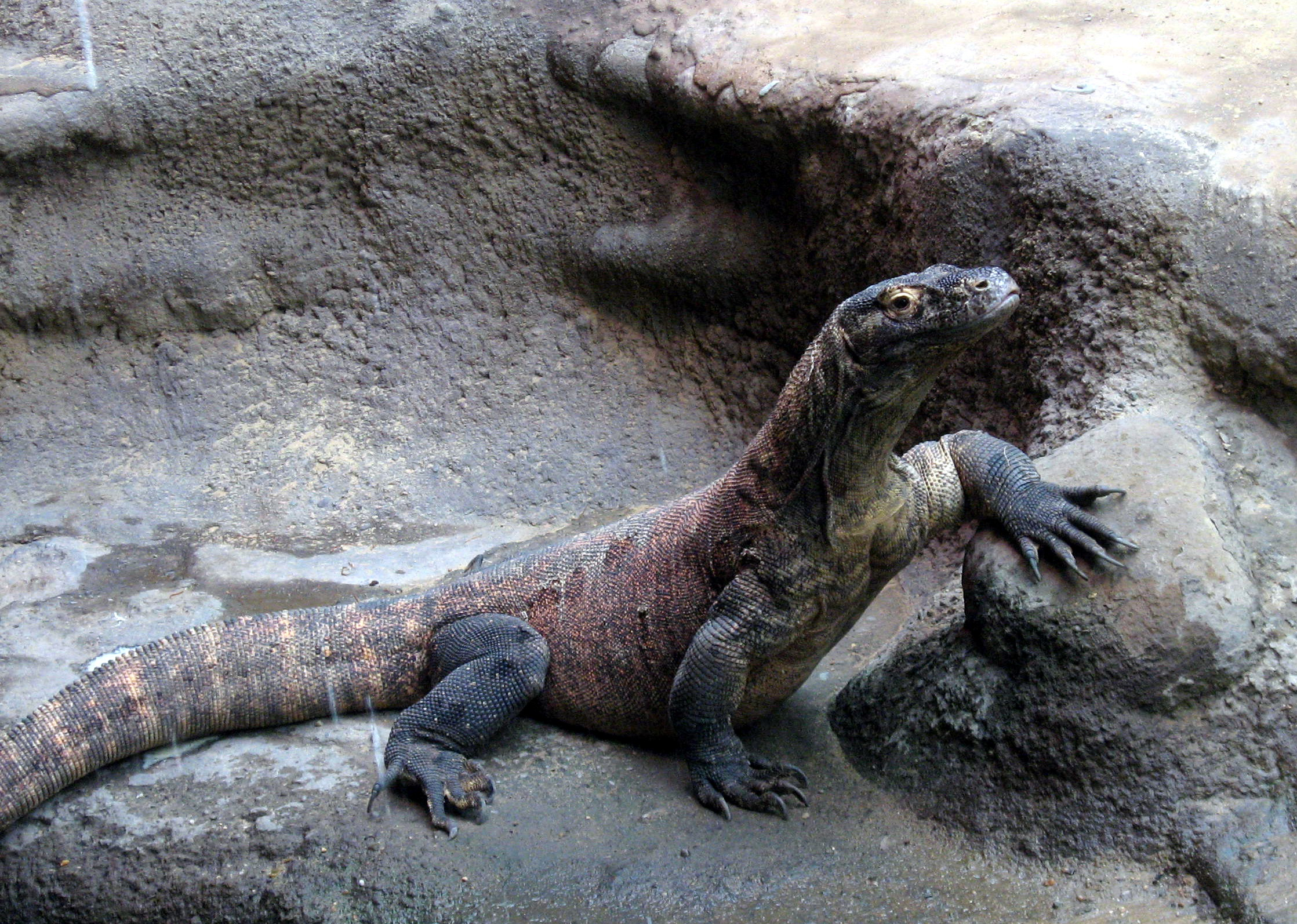
The Komodo dragon is an example of island gigantism.

After immigration, birds and some reptiles or mammals tend to become larger and predatory, showing relaxed intraspecific competition. For mammals, small species will increase in size and large species will decrease in size. This is referred to as the "island rule," and is suggested to minimize energy expenditure.

Other adaptations to life on islands include increased poikilothermy, relaxed anti-predator behavior, and reduced sexual selection in animals, and loss of herbivore defenses and reduced dispersal in plants.

=== Speciation ===
The formation of new islands and their isolation from the mainland provides many unoccupied niches for species to adapt to. Since immigration of predators and competitors is limited, many organisms are able to persist in these new niches. This results in a high occurrence of endemism, where species are unique to a localized area. For example, 50% of endemic bird areas are found on islands.

Endemism is often the result of adaptive radiation. Adaptive radiation is when a single species colonizes an area and rapidly diversifies to fill all of the available niches. A common example is the assemblage of finch species documented by Charles Darwin in the Galapagos Islands. Darwin's finches exhibited adaptive radiation by evolving different beak sizes to exploit the diversity of seeds present on the different islands.

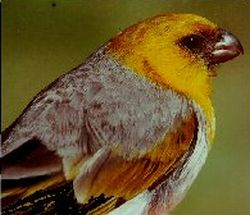
The palila, one of several endangered honeycreepers that evolved through adaptive radiation and are endemic to the Hawaiian Islands.

Because the distributions of these populations are limited by their island habitats, they tend to have fewer individuals than their mainland counterparts and lower genetic variation. This, along with the behavioral and ecological factors mentioned above, makes island species more vulnerable to extinction.

=== Survival ===
The continued survival of species on islands depends on factors such as natural selection, genetic variation, natural disturbances (hurricanes, volcanic eruptions) and human-caused disturbances (introduced species, habitat loss). Human-caused disturbances tend to be the greatest cause of mortality, and understanding the causes of extinction facilitates conservation efforts.

=== Human impacts on island ecosystems ===
The movement of humans to islands has led to rapid extinction of native island species either from hunting, habitat destruction, or introduced species.

=== Hunting ===
Many large animals on islands have been hunted to extinction by humans. A well-known example is the dodo, once found on the island of Mauritius. It evolved to become large, flightless and docile, and was subsequently driven to extinction by humans and introduced predators.

=== Habitat destruction ===
The depletion of natural resources can have dramatic effects on island ecology. On Easter Island, the depletion of the forest by humans not only resulted in widespread loss of species, but also the collapse of the island civilization.

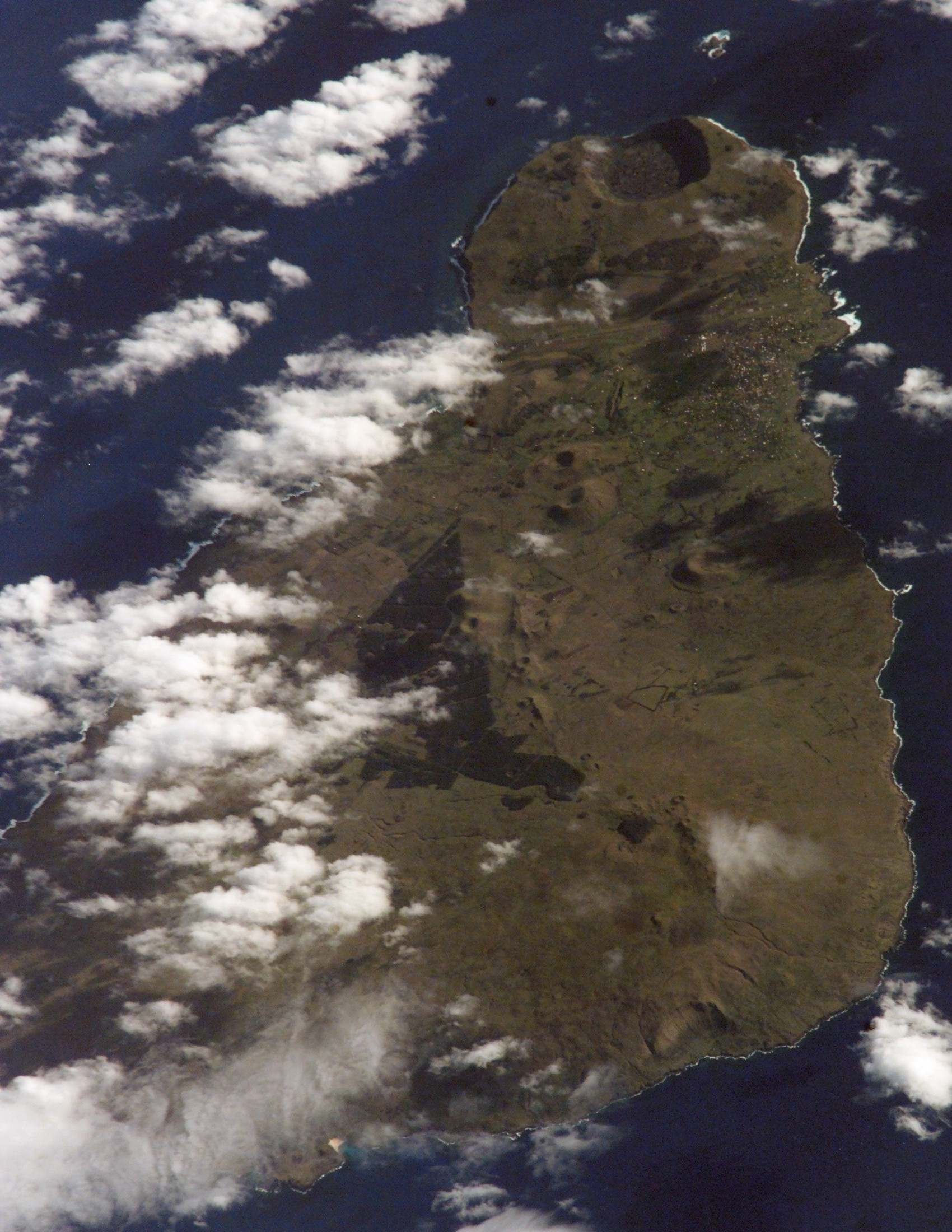
Easter Island has been a site of dramatic ecological change.

Today there are over 500 million people on islands, all dependent on local resources either directly (traditional use) or indirectly (ecotourism revenue). Population growth and development result in heavy deforestation, pollution, and over-exploitation. Overharvesting of ocean fauna is particularly troubling as yields of coral reef fish species are an important food source for island populations.

=== Introduced species ===
Humans have contributed to globalization and decreased effective isolation of island communities, allowing for invasion of exotic species. This can have a profound effect on the native species. In Guam, the introduced brown tree snake ate nearly all of the native vertebrate species to extinction. Feral cats and dogs have also greatly diminished native vertebrate populations on islands, through both predation and disease. Introduced ungulates are another major threat, as they graze on native vegetation and can destroy entire forests. Exotic grasses can out-compete native understory species and increase the risk of fire. Lastly, social insects such as ants also cause major problems.

Nonnative species introduced onto islands can have profound effects on an island's ecosystem, more so than nonnative species introduced to continental land (Platenberg). The higher impact of introduced and nonnative species on islands is largely a result of lower biodiversity levels (Platenburg et al.). Biodiversity on islands is especially threatened by logging, hunting, fishing and plant gathering. However, islands' vulnerability to introduced species is also due to agricultural, economic, and health differences as compared to continental land (Russel et al.).

The smaller land area and population sizes of islands compared to continents create greater vulnerability to the impacts of introduced species (Russel et al.). Introduced species negatively impact ecosystems through altered predator-prey interactions that can cause harm or even local extinction to native species populations (Towns et al.). There are many examples of animal species such as birds, reptiles, and aquatic insects being harmed by the introduction of predators such as rats, cats, and ants. For example, seabirds on islands in Hawaii are impacted by non-native predators like barn owls and ants. At a colony in Hawaii, at least 20% of wedge-tailed shearwater eggs were taken by mynas, dark-plumaged birds of the starling family (Towns et al.). Also in Hawaii, more than forty four introduced ant species, especially tropical fire ants, caused detriments to the growth of shearwater chicks, such as loss of tissue in their feet (Towns et al.).

Other examples of high-impact species to island ecosystems are the Cuban treefrog and cane toad, which were introduced to the US Virgin Islands under various circumstances (Platenberg). The Cuban treefrog has been present in the USVI since arriving unintentionally on a cargo ship in the 1970s (Platenberg). The Cuban tree frog is known for its ability to survive under harsh conditions, and it is highly adaptable, as it will eat a wide variety of organisms (Platenberg). Native frog and anole lizard populations have declined, likely due to Cuban tree frog interference (Platenberg). In contrast to the accidental introduction of the Cuban treefrog, the cane toad was deliberately introduced to control agricultural pests (Platenberg). Similar to the Cuban treefrog, the cane toad is also omnivorous. Cane toad tadpoles compete for limited freshwater resources with the white-lipped frog, a native species, thus limiting their resources (Platenberg). In general, when the introduction of a nonnative species results in extinction, the ecosystem experiences losses in some trophic levels (Platenberg). For example, vertebrate herbivores that are prone to extinction change the ecosystem function in plant communities. This phenomenon is seen in New Zealand, where the loss of bird species may have changed dynamics in avian-induced vegetation communities and impacted abundances of forest plants (Platenberg).

Also in New Zealand, small mammalian predators such as rodents have little direct effect on vegetation but have greater effect on island faunas through extinction and displacement (Wood et al.). Pacific rats, for example, were thought to be causing the local extinction of large, nocturnal ground-dwelling lizards, and they were assumed to have minimal effect on diurnal species, those that sleep at night, such as shore skinks (Wood et al.). In places where Pacific rats were removed, however, shore skink populations rapidly changed, indicating that the rats' impact has been underestimated (Wood et al.).

The loss of a keystone species, a species that all other species in the ecosystem depend on such as seabirds, can also have significant effects (Towns). Seabirds are essential to the structure of the ecosystem because they transport large amounts of nutrients into ecosystems and burrow into soils, helping vegetation (Towns). However, since human settlement, seabird communities have been severely impacted on islands across the globe (Towns). While some exotic species may perform ecological roles similar to those of extinct species, there are many roles that cannot be fulfilled by other species. Therefore, similar exotic species do not offer complete replacement for extinct species in the community (Towns). Even if the number of species introduced to an island is roughly the same as the number of extinct ones, the ecological traits are not comparable enough to make up for losses (Towns).

=== Global warming ===
Global warming is emerging as a strong cause of species loss on islands. This can be due to sea level rise, the intrusion of salt water into freshwater habitats, or species inability to adapt to increasing temperatures and extreme weather events. Plant species are particularly susceptible. In more isolated areas, such as the Southern Ocean Islands, indirect effects such as invasive species and global warming can play a greater role in influencing populations than overexploitation, pollution and habitat loss.

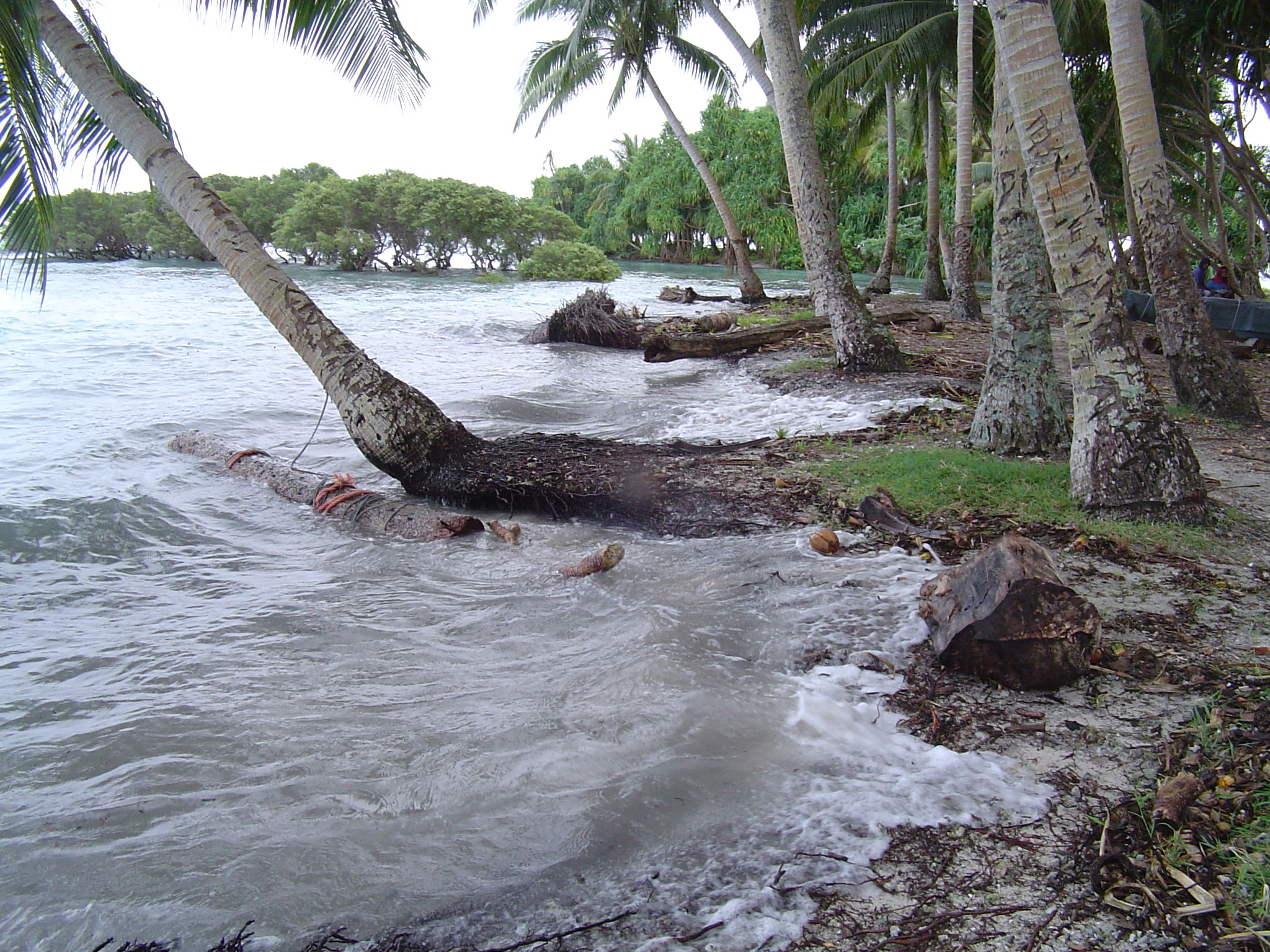
Sea level rise is a pressing concern for many island people.

=== Trophic cascades ===
Human activities and the introduction of non-native species often cause trophic cascades, where direct effects on one species result in indirect effects on other species in the food web. An example is on Santa Cruz Island of the California Channel Islands, where DDT poisoning reduced bald eagle populations. This, along with an abundance of introduced feral pigs for prey, allowed golden eagles to colonize the island and replace bald eagles. However, the golden eagles also ate native island foxes. Fox population levels decreased to near extinction, while skunk populations increased due to relaxed competition with foxes.

== Island conservation ==
=== Conservation on islands ===
Since island ecosystems are self-contained, it should be possible to mitigate many of the threats to species. Ecologists and managers are working together to prioritize areas for conservation and to quickly design and implement action plans. Not everything can be put into a reserve, so it is important to first compile pertinent information and prioritize areas of concern. Once an area has been chosen, managers must then acquire ownership and gain support. Local experts and indigenous populations should also be involved in this process. Having clearly defined goals will facilitate the many necessary interactions between people and agencies. Once a reserve is in place, managers can then practice adaptive management and do continued community education.

On land, island conservation focuses on the protection of species and their habitat. In some cases, conservation can be integrated with agricultural production. For example, the Acacia koa plantations and wooded pastures in Hawaii are anthropogenically altered ecosystems, yet allow connectivity between forest fragments and thus maintain higher diversity than would open pasture. Other directions include habitat restoration, and eradication of introduced predators, ungulates, and exotic plants (via hunting, removal or biological control).

In marine ecosystems, there has been an increasing establishment of "no-take" reserves. This allows for the reestablishment of native species, and also the augmentation of commercially harvested species. However, in both terrestrial and marine systems, these actions are expensive and do not always result in the desired outcomes. For example, some non-natives become keystone species and their removal can cause more harm than good to the ecosystem. To be more effective, managers of island ecosystems should share information and learn from each other's mistakes.

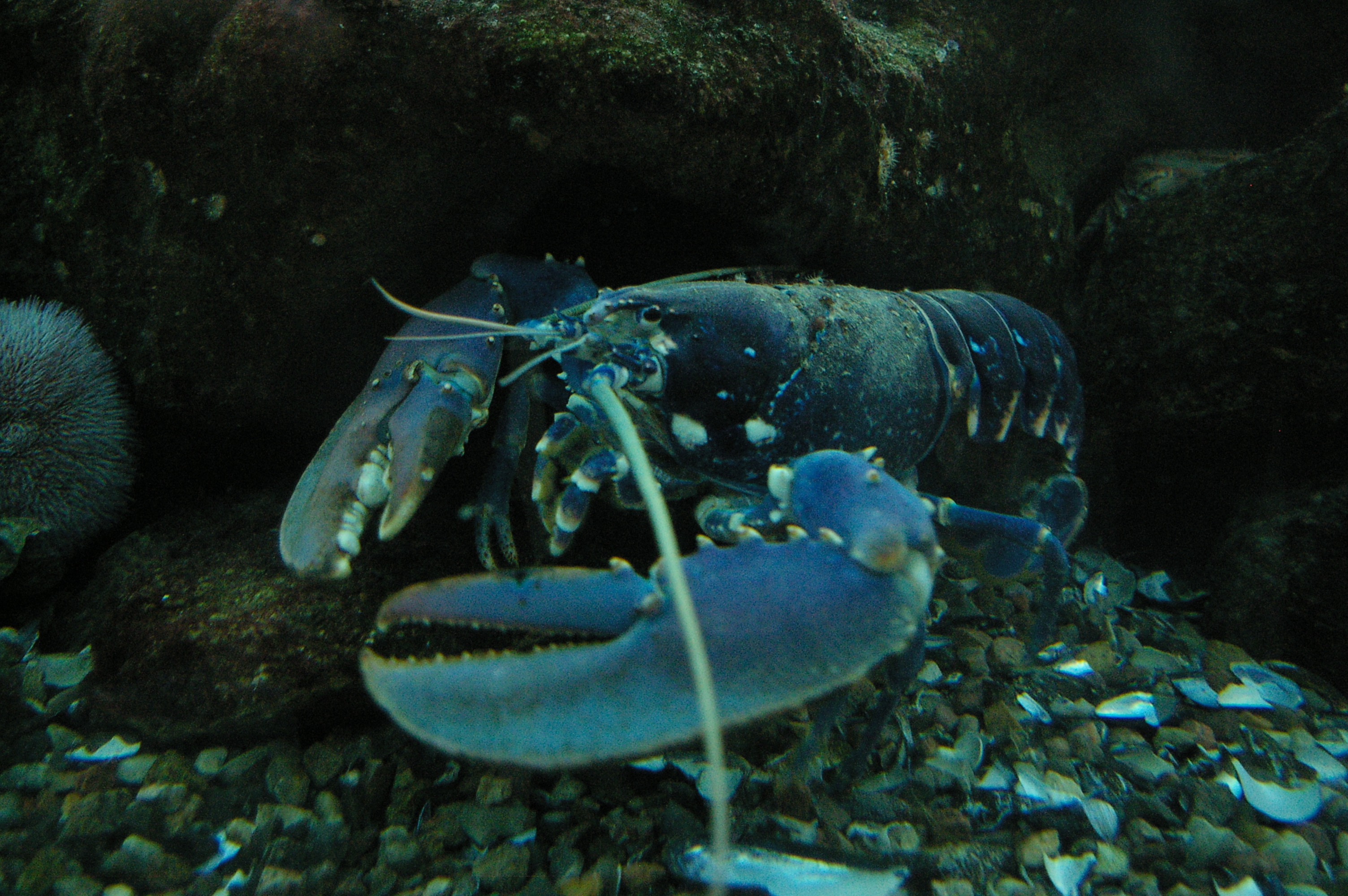
Lobster benefit greatly from the establishment of no-take zones on islands such as Great Britain, New Zealand, and Tonga.

=== Island restoration ===
Island conservation tends to focus on preservation of individual species and their habitats. However, many ecologists caution that ecological and evolutionary processes should be conserved as well. The conservation of island communities as a whole is closely linked to restoration.

Active restoration on islands can be done for both animal species (translocations, induced breeding) and plant species (reforestation). Creating goals for restoration can be challenging because it is often impossible to restore the ecosystem to its "historic" or "normal" state, if that state can even be clearly defined. Restoration is never complete, as ecological communities are always in a state of change.

=== Sustainable use ===
As resource depletion is a major issue on islands, the needs of human populations must also be taken into account. On many islands, scientists and managers are studying traditional practices of indigenous populations as potential conservation solutions. In some cases, limited-take systems that serve the community may provide a better alternative to fully closed protected areas, if there are not enough resources for proper enforcement. Public education plays an important role.

=== Science advancements ===
A significant advancement in the field is the shift from 2-D to 3-D science in ecology. This approach offers a comprehensive understanding of ecological dynamics and human impacts on both terrestrial and marine environments. The adoption of 3-D models supports better natural resource management and informs conservation and management plans. This transition also affects how policymakers evaluate regulations, providing a more dynamic perspective on ecological and environmental challenges.

== See also ==
- Disturbance (ecology)
- Island biogeography
- Island syndrome
- Hawaiian honeycreeper conservation
- Mammals of the Caribbean
- Patch dynamics
- Distance decay
- Sky island
