= Leslie C. Aiello =

American archaeologist, prehistorian and paleoanthropologist

Leslie Crum Aiello FBA (born May 26, 1946, in Pasadena, California) is an American paleoanthropologist and professor emeritus of University College London. She was the president of Axel Lennart Wenner-Gren donated Wenner-Gren Foundation for Anthropological Research from 2005 to 2017. In 2014, Aiello was elected to the American Philosophical Society. She is currently president of the American Association of Physical Anthropologists.

== Biography ==
Beginning in 1964, Aiello studied anthropology at the University of California, Los Angeles, earning a bachelor's degree, and later a master's degree (completed in 1970), in anthropology. While working on her BA, she spent a year (1965–66) studying abroad at the University of Göttingen. She later received her PhD from the University of London in human evolution and anatomy. Aiello remained at the University of London where she became a professor of biological anthropology in 1995. During this time, she was the co-managing editor for the Journal of Human Evolution (1993-1999). She was the head of the UCL Anthropology Department (1996-2002) and the UCL Graduate School (2002-2005).

Aiello is a Fellow of the American Association for the Advancement of Science and the Zoological Society of London and, since 2011, a member of the German Academy of Sciences Leopoldina and, since 2014, the American Philosophical Society.

She co-wrote the textbook, An Introduction to Human Evolutionary Anatomy, which uses the fossil record to predict the ways early hominids moved, ate and looked. She is now the president of the Manhattan-based Wenner-Gren Foundation for Anthropological Research.

Overall, Aiello has had 21 publications in the fields of physiology, anatomy and archaeology (under anthropology). She also has collaborated with 25 co-authors between 1981 and 2010.

== Research areas ==
Aiello studies evolutionary anthropology with focuses on human adaptation and life history, as well as the evolution of the brain, diet, language and cognition, and locomotion and its energetic costs. She has also researched Paleolithic hominids and their thermoregulation and climate adaptation.

In collaboration with Peter Wheeler, she developed the expensive tissue hypothesis (ETH), regarding early humans, according to which there is an inverse correlation between the increase in brain size during human evolution and the parallel reduction of the digestive tract as a result of richer protein animal foods. Another idea she posited was that higher reproductive costs would be the effect of this increase in brain size, which was compensated by the females increasing in size faster than the males. She highlighted that terrestriality (movement of early hominids from forest to savannahs) is the oldest stage that led to human civilization. The second stage was bipedialism and the third is encephalization (evoking larger brains). Aiello identified social implications of meat eating, one of which is food sharing, which does not happen often in primates, which strengthens the bond between female and offspring. The other societal implication is that meat eating likely led to division of labor between males and females (males hunting, females caring for dependent young). According to the ETH, meat eating did not cause larger brains, but simply made them possible.

Aiello emphasized that a large brain, long legs and the creation and use of tools probably evolved together, but not as a single package at the beginning of the lineage of Homo, especially in Australopithecus ancestors. Therefore, early humans were able to change with their changing environmental conditions, which allowed them to survive and spread from Africa around 1.85 million years ago. Aiello has said, "taken together, these data suggest that species of early Homo were more flexible in their dietary choices than other species." And, "their flexible diet — probably containing meat — was aided by stone tool-assisted foraging that allowed our ancestors to exploit a range of resources." Flexibility is a hallmark of human biology.

== Wenner-Gren Foundation ==
Aiello is currently the president of the Wenner-Gren Foundation. It was founded in 1941 in New York to support anthropological research in human origins. Every year it gives a total of $5 million in grants to further this research. "One of the real welcome trends in the field has been integrating other lines of study … to give us a much richer understanding of early humans." It founded the journal Current Anthropology which it continues to publish. The foundation seeks to support all areas of anthropology and other related disciplines that are concerned with human development, origins and variation.

== American Association of Physical Anthropologists ==
Aiello is the president of the American Association of Physical Anthropologists (AAPA). In 2016, she received the Gabriel W Lasker Service Award in recognition of excellence in service to the AAPA, its members and the field of physical anthropology.

== Published works: Selecta ==
- "The Expensive Tissue Hypothesis: Co-evolution of the brain and the digestive system in humans and other primates", International Journal of Anthropology, 9:3, 1994, p 166, doi: 10.1007/BF02575406
- Peter Wheeler: "The Expensive Tissue Hypothesis: The Brain and the Digestive System in Human and Primate Evolution", Current Anthropology, 36:2, 1995, pp 199–221, doi: 10.1086/204350
- "Brains and Guts in Human Evolution: The Expensive Tissue Hypothesis", Brazilian Journal of Genetics, 201, 1997, p 141–148, doi: 10.1590/S0100-84551997000100023
- "The expensive tissue hypothesis and the evolution of the human adaptive niche: a study in comparative anatomy", Justine Bayley (ed.), Science in Archaeology. Agenda for the Future of English Heritage, London 1998, pp 25–36, ISBN 1-85074-693-1
- with N. Bates and T. Joffe: "The expensive tissue hypothesis revisited", American Journal of Physical Anthropology, 104, Supplement 24, 1997, p 62
- with N. Bates and T. Joffe: "In defense of the expensive tissue hypothesis: ontogeny, maternal care and organ size", Dean Falk, Kathleen R. Gibson (ed.), Evolutionary Anatomy of the Primate Cerebral Cortex, Cambridge University Press., Cambridge 2001, pp 57–78, ISBN 0-521-64271-X
- Cathy Key: "The energetic Consequences of being a female Homo erectus", American Journal of Human Biology, 14:5, 2002, pp 551–565. doi: 10.1002/ajhb.10069
- Jonathan CK Wells: "Energetics and the evolution of the genus Homo", Annual Review of Anthropology, 31, 2002, pp 323–338, doi: 10.1146/annurev.anthro.31.040402.085403
- with WEH Harcourt-Smith: "Fossils, feet and the evolution of human bipedal locomotion", Journal of Anatomy, 204:5, 2004, pp 403–416. doi : 10.1111/j.0021-8782.2004.00296. x, Full Text
- "Five years of Homo floresiensis", American Journal of Physical Anthropology, 142:2, 2010, pp 167–179, doi: 10.1002/ajpa.21255
