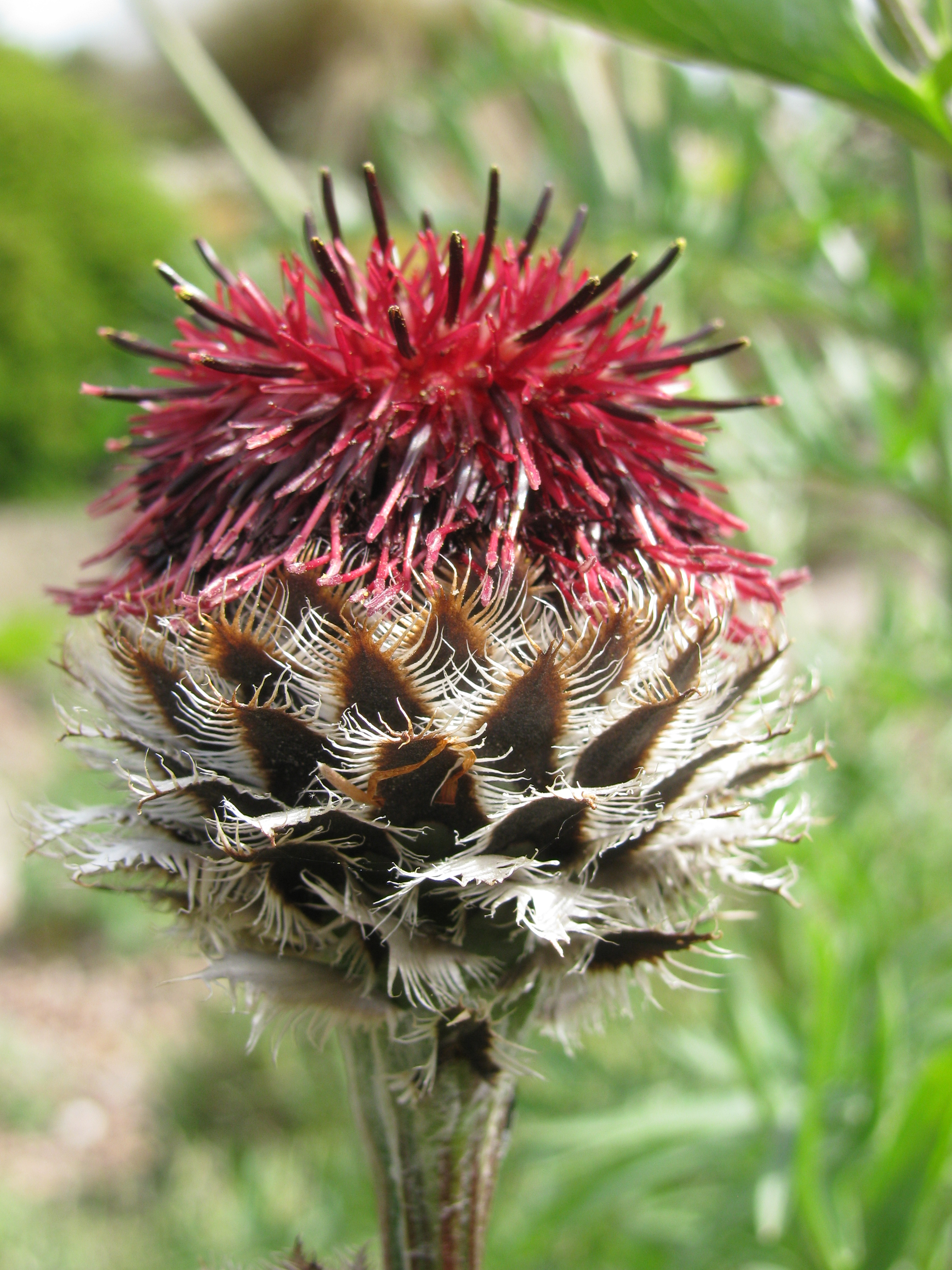

Scientific classification
- Kingdom: Plantae
- Clade: Tracheophytes
- Clade: Angiosperms
- Clade: Eudicots
- Clade: Asterids
- Order: Asterales
- Family: Asteraceae
- Genus: Centaurea
- Species: C. atropurpurea

Binomial name
- Centaurea atropurpurea Waldst. & Kit.

= Centaurea atropurpurea =

Species of flowering plant

Centaurea atropurpurea is a species of Centaurea found in Romania and the Balkan Peninsula.
