= Expensive tissue hypothesis =

Hypothesis in evolutionary biology

The expensive tissue hypothesis (ETH) relates brain and gut size in evolution (specifically in human evolution). It suggests that in order for an organism to evolve a large brain without a significant increase in basal metabolic rate (as seen in humans), the organism must use less energy on other expensive tissues; the paper introducing the ETH suggests that in humans, this was achieved by eating an easy-to-digest diet and evolving a smaller, less energy-intensive gut. The ETH has inspired many research projects to test its validity in primates and other organisms.

The human brain stands out among the mammals because of its relative size compared to the rest of the body. The brain of Homo sapiens is about three times larger than that of its closest living relative, the chimpanzee. For a primate of its body size, the relative size of the brain and that of the digestive tract is rather unexpected; the digestive tract is smaller than expected for a primate of a human body size. In 1995, two scientists proposed an attempt to solve this phenomenon of human evolution using the Expensive Tissue Hypothesis.

== Original paper ==
The original paper introducing the ETH was written by Leslie Aiello and P. E. Wheeler. Availability to new data on basal metabolic rate (BMR) and brain size has shown that energetics is an issue in the maintenance of a relatively large brain, like the human brain. In mammals, brain size is positively correlated with the BMR. In the paper, Aiello and Wheeler sought to explain how humans managed to provide enough energy to their large and metabolically expensive brains while still maintaining a BMR comparable to other primates with smaller brains. They found that humans’ smaller relative gut size almost completely compensated for the metabolic cost of the larger brain. They went on to postulate that a larger brain would allow for more complex foraging behavior, which would result in a higher quality diet, which would then allow the gut to shrink further, freeing up more energy for the brain. This research also presented a case for studying the evolution of organs in a more interconnected manner, rather than in isolation.

== Further research ==
Anthropologists have been able to observe a dramatic contrast in relative brain size between humans and our great ape ancestors. Studies have shown that brain size differences underlie major differences in cognitive performance. Brain tissue is energetically expensive, requiring a great amount of energy compared to several other somatic tissues during rest. To understand how the body is able to provide the brain with the right amount of energy to function properly, scientists consider the cost side of the equation and focus on how brain and other expensive tissues such as the gut or the testes may trade off. Another possibility is that there may not be any trading off, rather there are other ways that humans are keeping the brain nourished.

The academic debate around the ETH is still active, and has inspired a number of similar tests, all attempting to verify or disprove the hypothesis in another species or group of species by looking at encephalization (a ratio between brain size and body size), gut size, and/or diet quality. Primates, being the closest living relatives to humans, are a natural starting point for testing the hypothesis, and as such are examined by many of these tests. One such study supported the expensive tissue hypothesis and found a positive correlation between diet quality and brain size (as would be expected by the original paper), but it did note that there were exceptions among the species tested. A broader study including primates and other mammals disputed the ETH, finding that there is no negative correlation between brain and gut sizes; it did, however, support the idea of energy trade-offs in evolution as it found a negative correlation between encephalization and adipose deposits.

Studies have also been done in species less similar to humans, such as anurans and fish. The study of anurans found that among the 30 species tested, there was a significant negative correlation between gut size and brain size, as Aiello and Wheeler found in humans and primates in their original research. One study of fish used Peters' elephantnose fish (Gnathonemus petersii), a species of carnivorous fish, which has a uniquely large brain, about three times the size expected for a fish of its body size. The research found that these fish also had significantly smaller guts than other similar carnivorous fish. These further studies enrich the debate over the ETH.

A 2018 study by Huang, Yu, and Liao investigated the possible effects of gut microbiota in the expensive tissue hypothesis among vertebrates. Researchers have investigated various symbiotic gut bacteria as well as other microorganisms that have coevolved in the digestive tracts of humans and other animals. These microbiotas have evolved to form mutually beneficial relationships with their hosts, and play important roles in immune function, nutrition, and physiology. Any disruption in the gut can lead to gastrointestinal dysfunction like obesity, for example. Several studies have also shown that the diversity and composition of gut microbiota vary topographically and temporarily. This is because specific bacteria have been linked to the host's food intake as well as the use of nutrition and energy metabolism. Any changes or modifications of the microbial landscape in the gut can lead to several complex and dynamic interactions throughout life. Additionally, the choice of the host is strongly associated with the diversification and complexity of the microbiota; for instance, the study illustrated that a diet high in fat increases the number of bacteria belonging to the phylum Bacteroidetes and decreases the number belonging to the Firmicutes in children's guts, and also theorized that diet quality is related to gut size.

The same study also found that gut size has also seen coevolution alongside brain size, partly because the brain and the gut are both among the most energetically costly organs in vertebrate bodies. Based on the expensive tissue hypothesis, the higher energy expenditure of vertebrates with larger brains is balanced by a corresponding decrease in the energy consumed by other energetically costly organs, e.g. the gut. Some evidence also suggests that vertebrates with large brains have evolved to balance out the energetic expenditure by trading off with gut size. For example, researchers have found a negative correlation between brain size and gut size in guppies as well as the Omei wood frog. Gut microbiota respond to diet quality in a way that influences the metabolism of the host. For instance, improving energy yield in the host by increasing the efficiency of certain metabolic pathways is one of the main processes that drives the trade-off between brain size and gut size. This process is also correlated with the ETH hypothesis because brain size increases when energy input is at a high level due to consumption of high-energy diets and the overall increase in constant energy input. However, after several investigations, the study did not find strong evidence to support the notion that brain size is negatively correlated with gut microbiota in vertebrates.

A similar study was done by Tsuboi et al., showing clear evidence that brain size is correlated with gut size by controlling the effects of shared ancestral and ecological confounding variables. The study found that the evolution of a larger brain is closely related to an increase in reproductive investment in egg size and parental size. The result of the experiment concluded that the energy cost of encephalization might have played a role in the evolution of brain size in both endothermic as well as ectothermic vertebrates. For example, the study found that homeothermic vertebrates such as the elephantnose fish Gnathonemus petersii have a large brain and a smaller intestine and stomach size, which suggests that energy constraints on brain size are found in highly encephalized tropical species. Additionally, the study found that the evolution of brain size is associated with an increase in egg size and can lead to an extended period of parental care, and that the energetic constraints of encephalization are also applicable to homeothermic vertebrates. Despite this evidence, however, most of the study was done on live-bearing and egg-bearing species within the Chondrichthyes, and cannot necessarily be generalized across all homeothermic and ectothermic vertebrates.

Further studies did show that there is definitely a positive correlation between brain mass residuals and BMS residuals in mammals, but the relationship is only significant in primates. When considering the expensive tissue hypothesis, one also needs to consider how energy trade-off hypotheses affect the rest of the body, too. Animals might escape energetic constraints by reducing the size of other expensive tissues in the body or by reducing energy allocation to expensive processes such as locomotion or reproduction.
