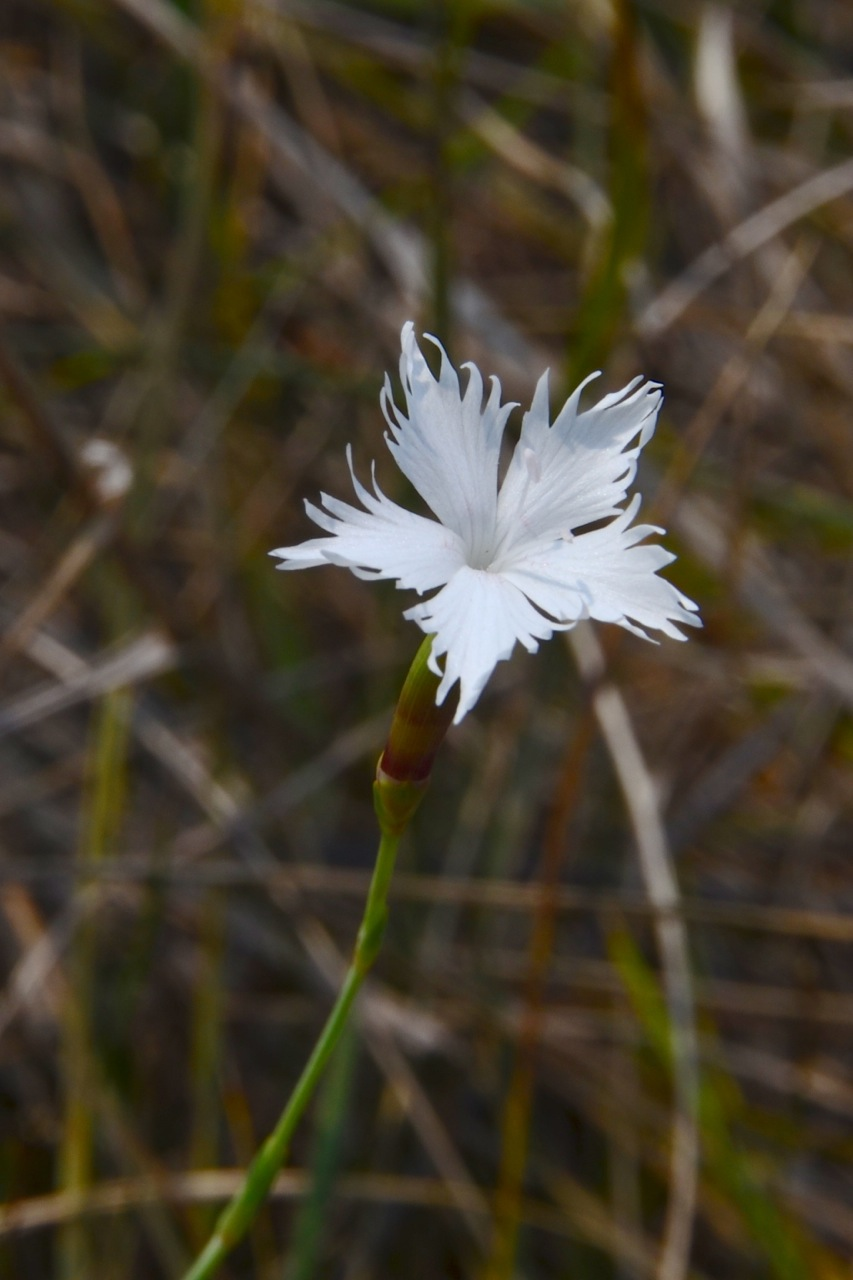

Conservation status
- Data Deficient (IUCN 3.1)

Scientific classification
- Kingdom: Plantae
- Clade: Tracheophytes
- Clade: Angiosperms
- Clade: Eudicots
- Order: Caryophyllales
- Family: Caryophyllaceae
- Genus: Dianthus
- Species: D. serotinus

Binomial name
- Dianthus serotinus Waldst. & Kit.

= Dianthus serotinus =

Species of flowering plant

Dianthus serotinus, called the late pink, late-coming pink, late carnation or late-coming carnation due to its tendency to bloom from June to October, is a species of Dianthus native to the Pannonian Basin of Hungary and nearby areas. It prefers to grow in the sand-steppe or other sandy soils.
