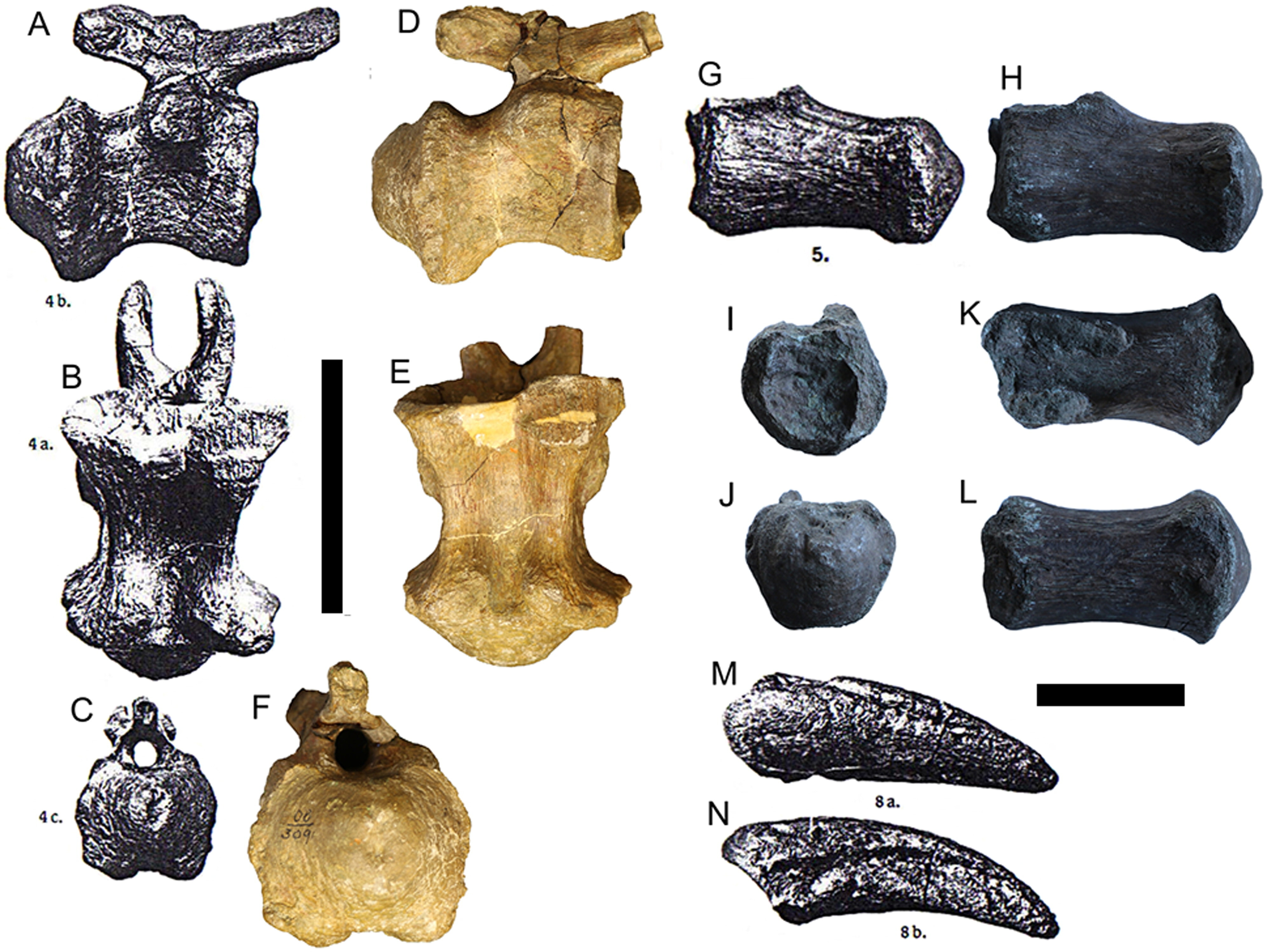
- Titanosaur remains used to erect Magyarosaurus dacus, including the lectotype (A-F)

Scientific classification
- Kingdom: Animalia
- Phylum: Chordata
- Class: Reptilia
- Clade: Dinosauria
- Clade: Saurischia
- Clade: †Sauropodomorpha
- Clade: †Sauropoda
- Clade: †Macronaria
- Clade: †Titanosauria
- Genus: †Magyarosaurus von Huene, 1932
- Species: †M. dacus

Binomial name
- †Magyarosaurus dacus (Nopcsa, 1915) [originally Titanosaurus dacus]

Synonyms
- Titanosaurus dacus Nopcsa, 1915; Magyarosaurus transsylvanicus von Huene, 1932

= Magyarosaurus =

Magyarosaurus Temporal range: Maastrichtian, 71–66 Ma

Extinct genus of dinosaurs

Magyarosaurus ("Hungarian lizard") is a genus of dwarf sauropod dinosaur from late Cretaceous Period (early to late Maastrichtian) in today's Transylvania. It is one of the smallest-known adult sauropods, measuring less than 3 m (9.8 ft) meters long and weighing less than 1,000 kg (2,200 lb). The type and only species is Magyarosaurus dacus. It has been found to be a close relative of Rapetosaurus in the family Saltasauridae in the sauropod clade Titanosauria in a 2005 study.

== Discovery ==
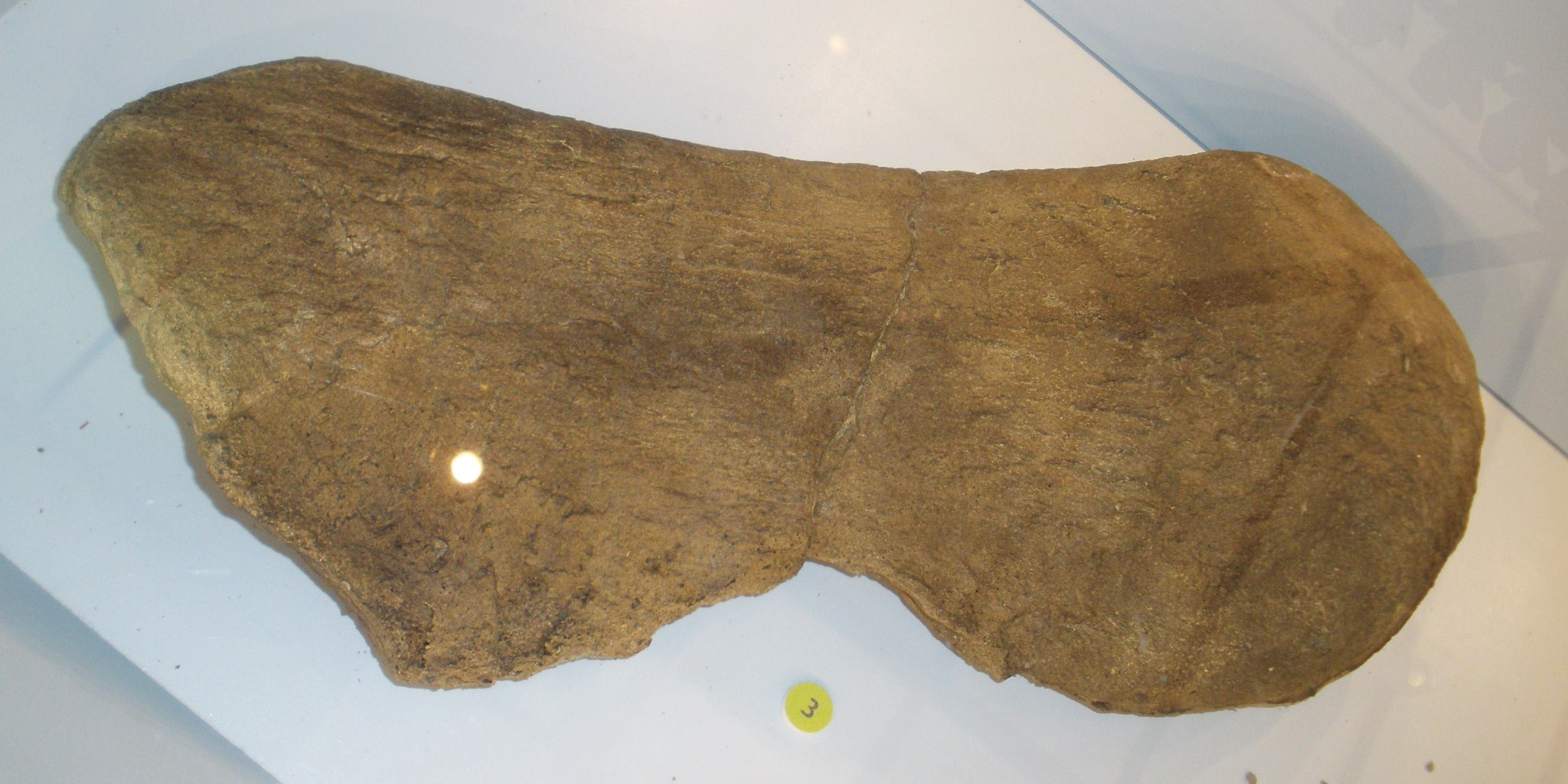
Magyarosaurus sp. scapula

Remains belonging to at least ten individuals have been recovered since 1895 from the Hunedoara region (Sânpetru Formation) in the area which was, at the time of their discovery, Hungary, but is now western Romania. Initially they were named Titanosaurus dacus, the specific name referring to the Dacians (who had lived in that place about 2000 years ago), by Baron Nopcsa in 1915. In 1932, Friedrich von Huene reassigned this taxon to a new genus, Magyarosaurus, and he also named two other species within the genus: M. hungaricus and M. transsylvanicus. However, M. transsylvanicus represents a chimera and some material belongs to M. dacus, while M. hungaricus is now reassigned to a distinct genus Petrustitan with some previously referred material now being the specimens of another genus Uriash.

The lectotype of M. dacus is the anterior caudal vertebra SZTFH Ob.3091, and other specimens (SZTFH Ob.4215 and SZTFH Ob.3098) are also referred to M. dacus to erect this taxon. Numerous other bones have been found, mainly caudal vertebrae but also dorsals and elements of the appendicular skeleton. No remains of skulls are known. There has been a discovery of 14 fossil eggs which have been attributed to Magyarosaurus.

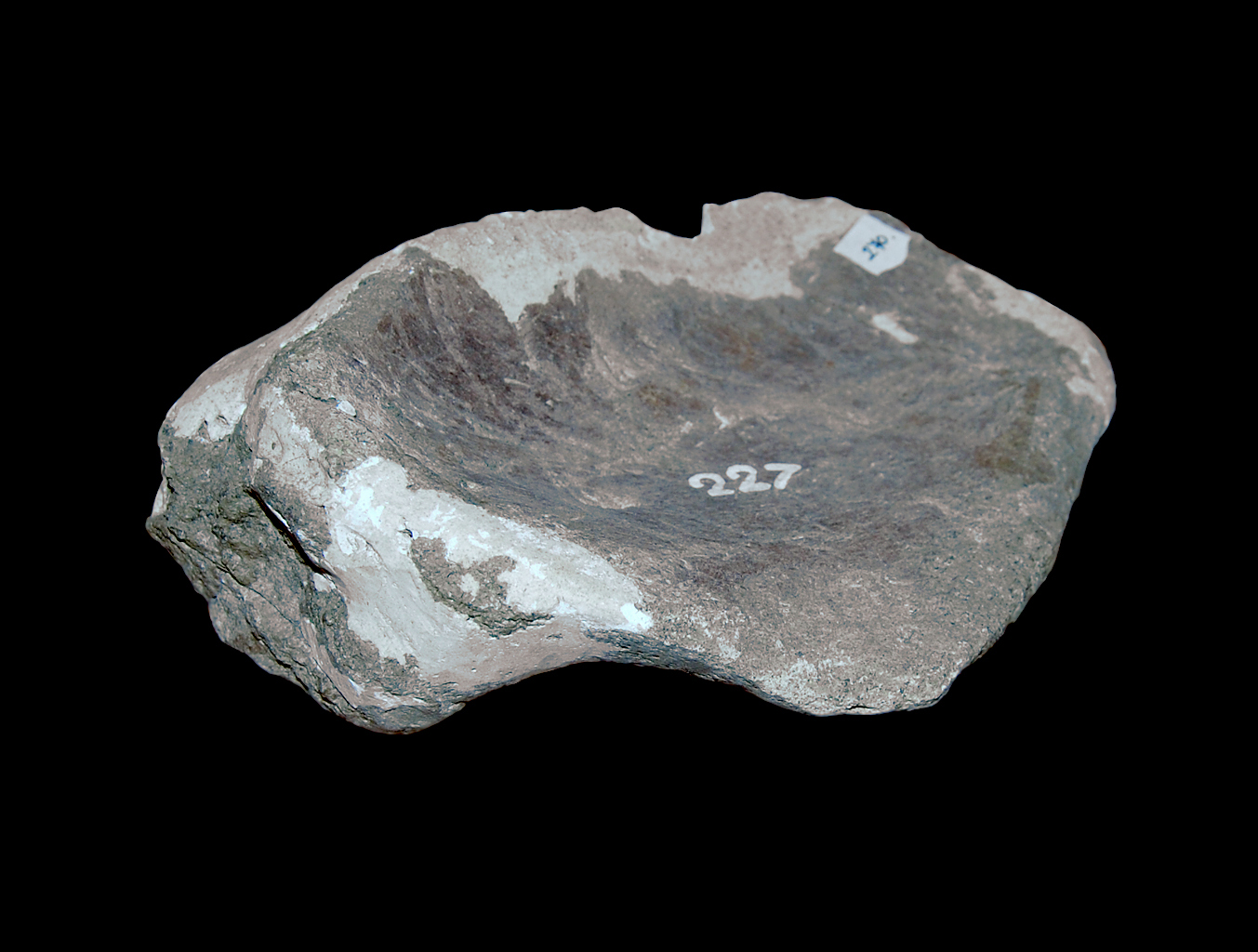
Coracoid

Paleontology investigations have been carried out at Râpa Roșie near Sebeș, on the southwestern side of the Transylvanian Basin. The investigations were started in 1969. Dinosaur bones were reported in earlier investigations. Based on the investigations carried out by Codrea and Dica in 2005, they have assigned the age of these formations to the Maastrichtian-Miocene age (also conjectured as of Eggenburgian-Ottnangian age). Some of the rare fossils found here are also vertebrates and one of these is of sauropod caudal vertebra. Paleontologists involved with the studies at Râpa Roșie have also opined that this is the only sauropod genus reported at any time in the latest Cretaceous Maastrichtian formations in Romania, which could be stated as Magyarosaurus.

== Description ==
Life restoration

Magyarosaurus was a relatively small sauropod, with specimens currently referrable to M. dacus measuring 2.16–2.82 m (7.1–9.3 ft) long and weighing up to 660–972 kg (1,455–2,143 lb). Its small size is a distinguishing autapomorphy, for none of its close relatives had such a reduced size. Magyarosaurus is also notable for the presence of dermal armour.

A distal caudal vertebrae was referred to the genus by Codrea et al. (2008). It was probably from near the middle of the tail as it has transitional features. Before it was definitively buried, the neural arch was broken off, probably by repositioning of the vertebrae from its original position. Its centrum is elongated, and measures 105 millimetres (4.1 in) long. Both sides that would have articulated with vertebrae were severely damaged. It is assigned to Magyarosaurus on the basis that no other sauropods are known from the region it was found in, and the fact that it is located between the two vertebrae compared with it because of its intermediate morphology.

== Paleobiology ==
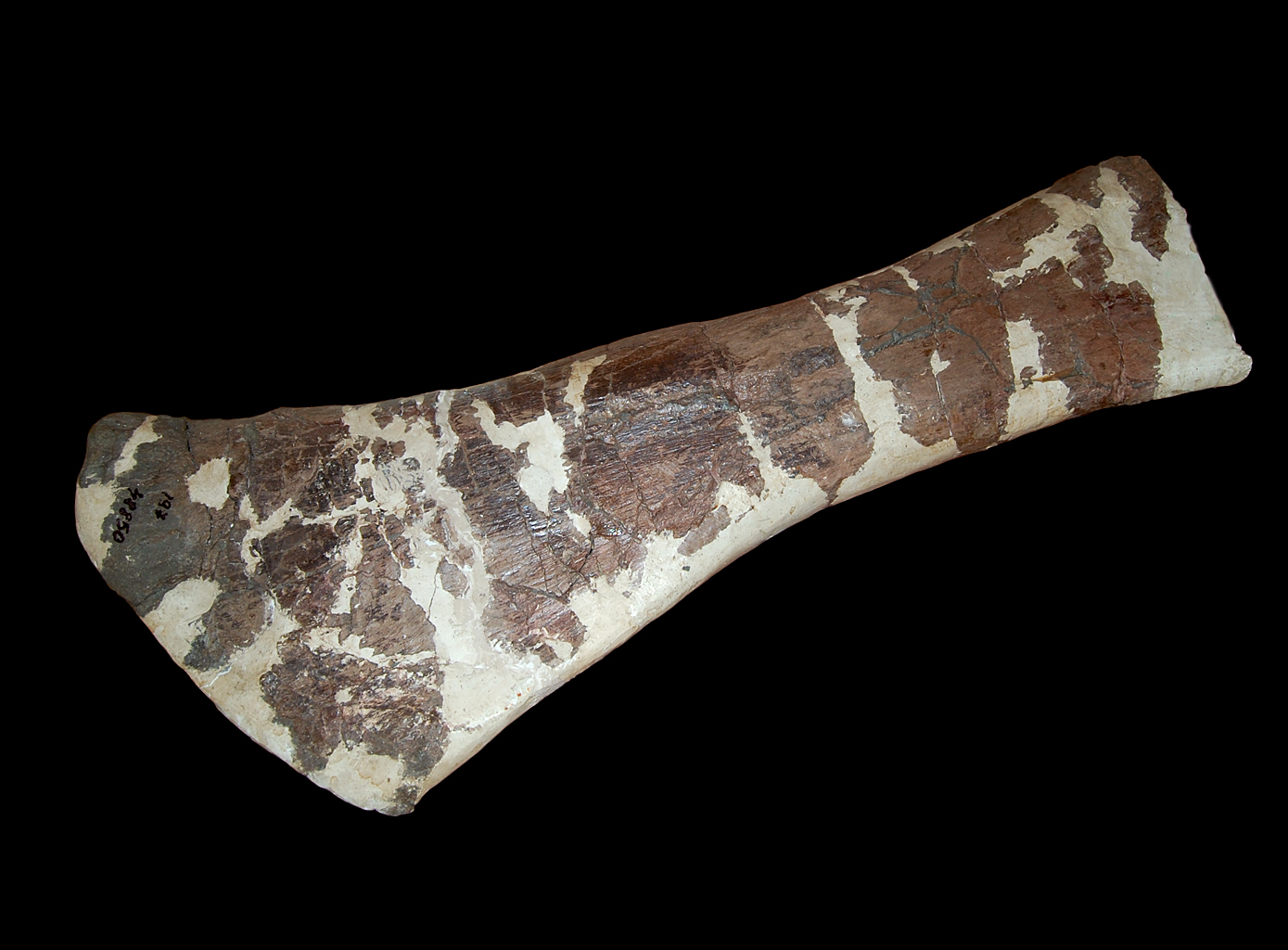
Humerus, Deva Natural History Museum

=== Dwarfism ===
The islands it inhabited led to Magyarosaurus becoming a product of insular dwarfism as a result of selective pressures presented by limited food supplies and a lack of predators, all favoring a smaller body size. This is seen in many other dinosaurs existing at the time, including the ornithopod Rhabdodon and the nodosaur Struthiosaurus. Nopcsa was the first to suggest island dwarfism as an explanation for the small size of Magyarosaurus compared to other sauropods. Later researchers doubted his conclusions, suggesting instead that the known Magyarosaurus fossil represented juveniles. However, a detailed study of bone growth patterns published in 2010 supported Nopcsa's original hypothesis, showing that the small Magyarosaurus individuals were adults. Island dwarfism has been suggested to have led to isolated genera retaining more primitive characteristics.

=== Histology ===
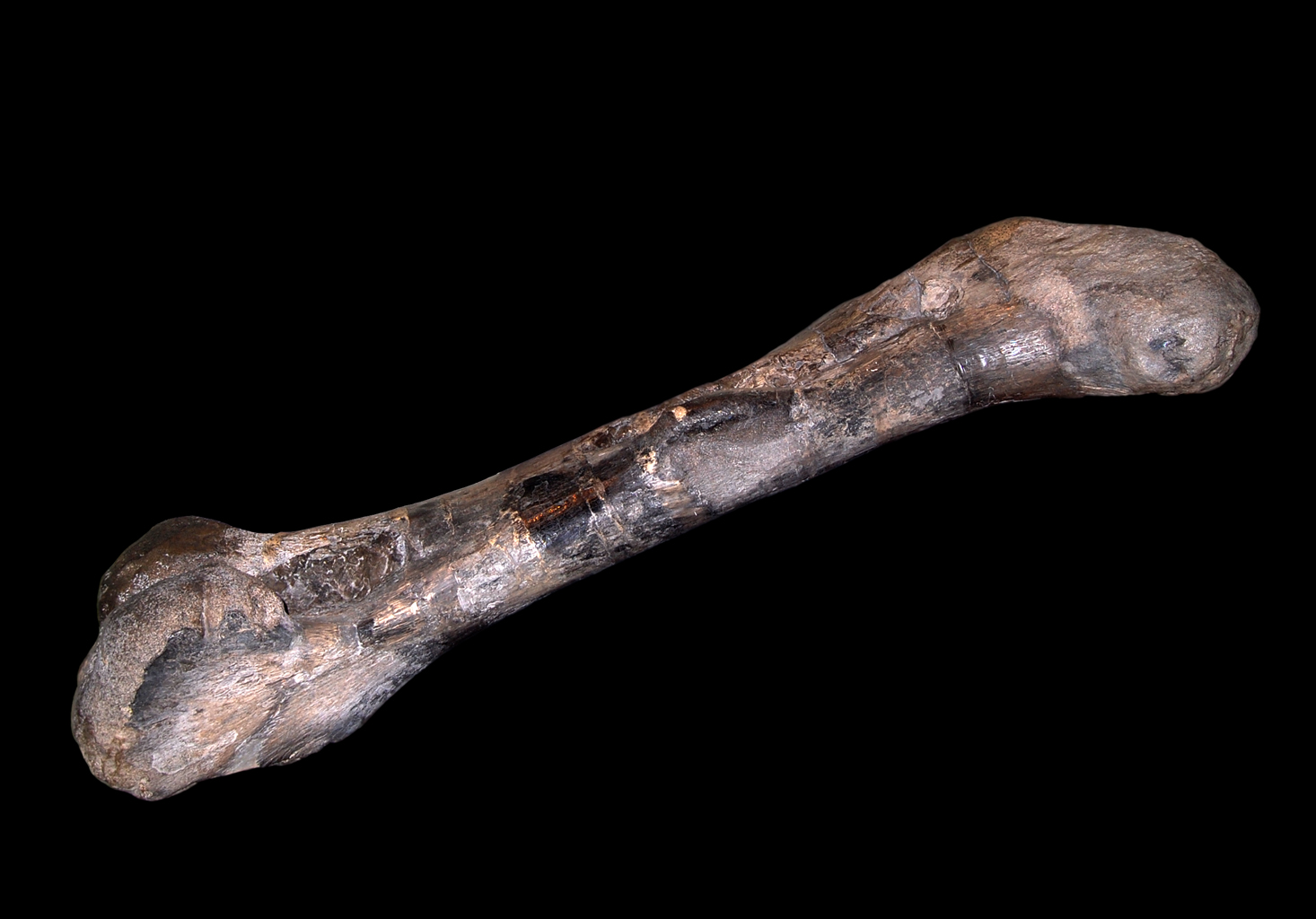
Limb bone

In 2010, Koen Stein et al. studied the histology of Magyarosaurus. They found that even the smallest individuals appeared to be adults. They also retained "M." hungaricus to represent the larger specimens that were too big to be variations of the smaller specimens. The histology of Magyarosaurus showed that it had a very reduced growth rate, but even so, had a high metabolic rate.

=== Armour ===
An osteoderm discovered in the "La Cãrare" locality. The locality is near Sînpetru village, in the Hațeg Basin of Romania. The osteoderm was assigned to Magyarosaurus dacus. This shows that dermal armour had a wide distribution in these Late Cretaceous sauropods. The osteoderms was peculiar in shape and size, and led to eggs being assigned to its family, Nemegtosauridae, and possibly to Magyarosaurus.

=== Possible eggs ===
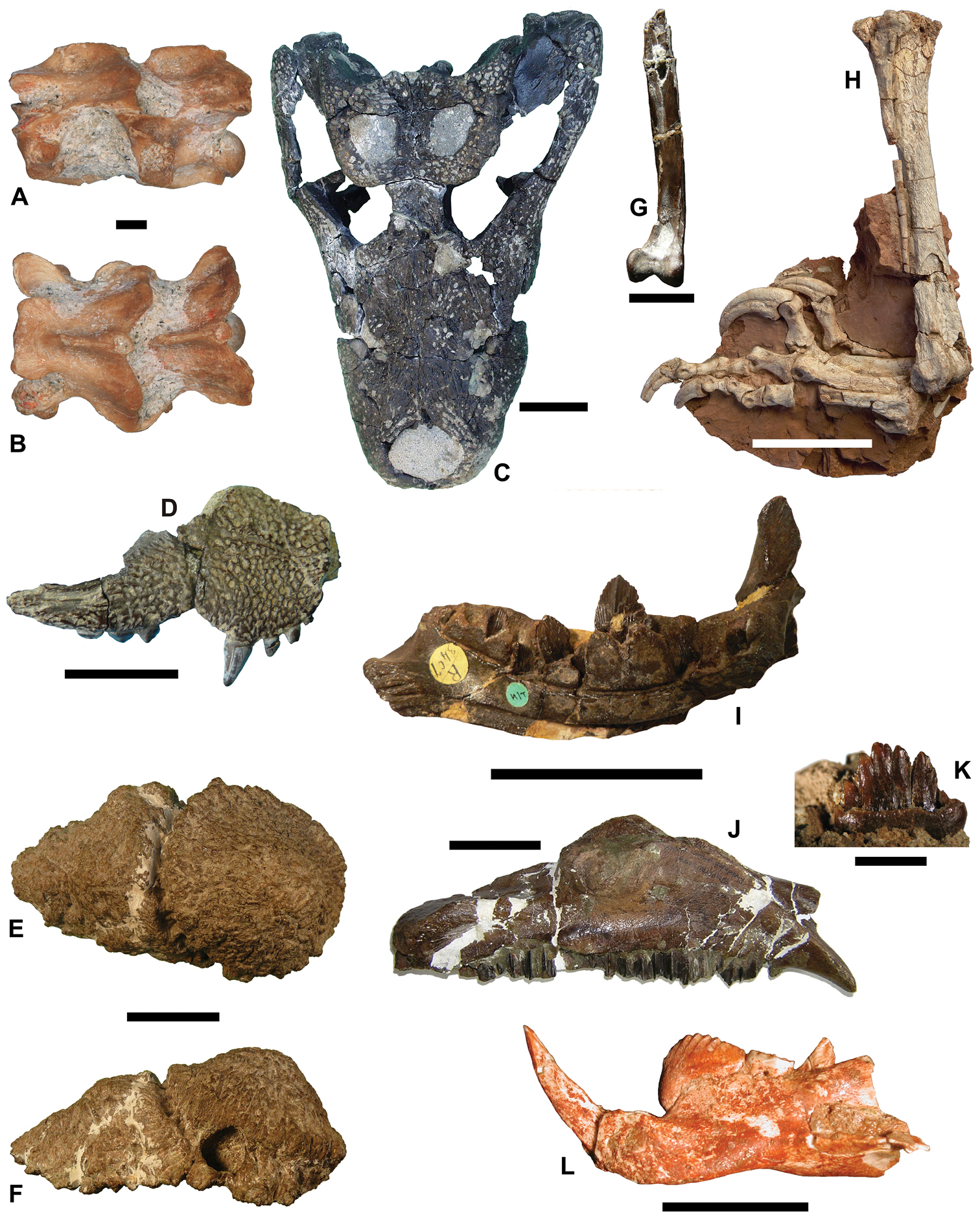
Fossils from the Late Cretaceous of Romania, including Magyarosaurus (E–F)

Lithostrotian eggs have been assigned to Nemegtosauridae. The eggs possibly belong to either Magyarosaurus dacus or Paludititan, the former being more likely. The Hațeg Basin was a large nesting place in the late Cretaceous, and is served as that for hadrosaurids, and titanosaurs. 11 eggs have been assigned to Nemegtosauridae, all from the Sânpetru Formation. Embryos were preserved inside the eggs, and one egg shows proof of dermal armouring.

The eggs were uncovered in 2001, during a field expedition by a Belgo-Romanian team. They were originally identified as in nests, but now it has been shown that no nesting structures has been preserved.

== Paleoecology ==
During the early Maastrichtian, the Hațeg Basin was subhumid, and had seasonal precipitation. However, during the later age of the formation, a large-scale paleoenvironmental change occurred, the region transformed into an extensive wetland.

Magyarosaurus dacus is known from the early Maastrichtian of the Sânpetru Formation, part of the Hațeg Basin in Romania. Also known from the Hațeg Basin are the small, basal hadrosaurid Telmatosaurus; the small nodosaurid Struthiosaurus; the maniraptorans Balaur, Bradycneme, and Elopteryx; the pterosaur Hatzegopteryx; and the two species of the euornithopod Zalmoxes.

M. sp. is known from a vertebra. The vertebra was found in the latest Cretaceous of the Sebeș Formation, although it was probably eroded from the Șard Formation and placed there. Alongside Magyarosaurus existed Kallokibotion, an ancient turtle; Balaur, a two-clawed avialan; and Eurazhdarcho, an azhdarchid. Alongside Magyarosaurus, Telmatosaurus and Zalmoxes also are dwarfed genera, as proven by their histology.

== See also ==
- Dinosaur size
