= List of Dianthus species =

The following species in the flowering plant genus Dianthus are accepted by Plants of the World Online. As of 2024, it accepts 359 species. The genus has undergone the fastest radiation known in any plant taxon.

== List ==
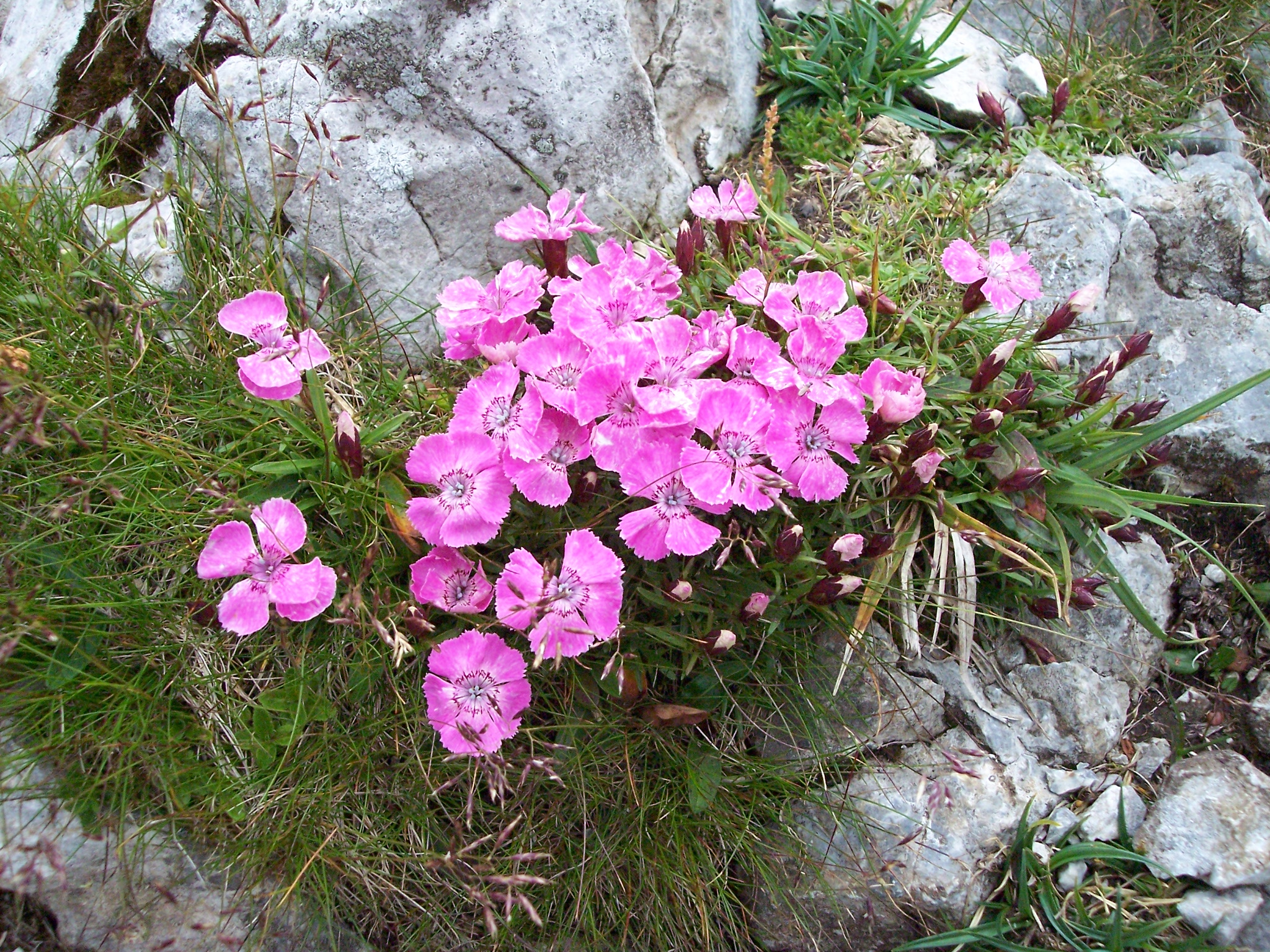
Alpine pink, Dianthus alpinus

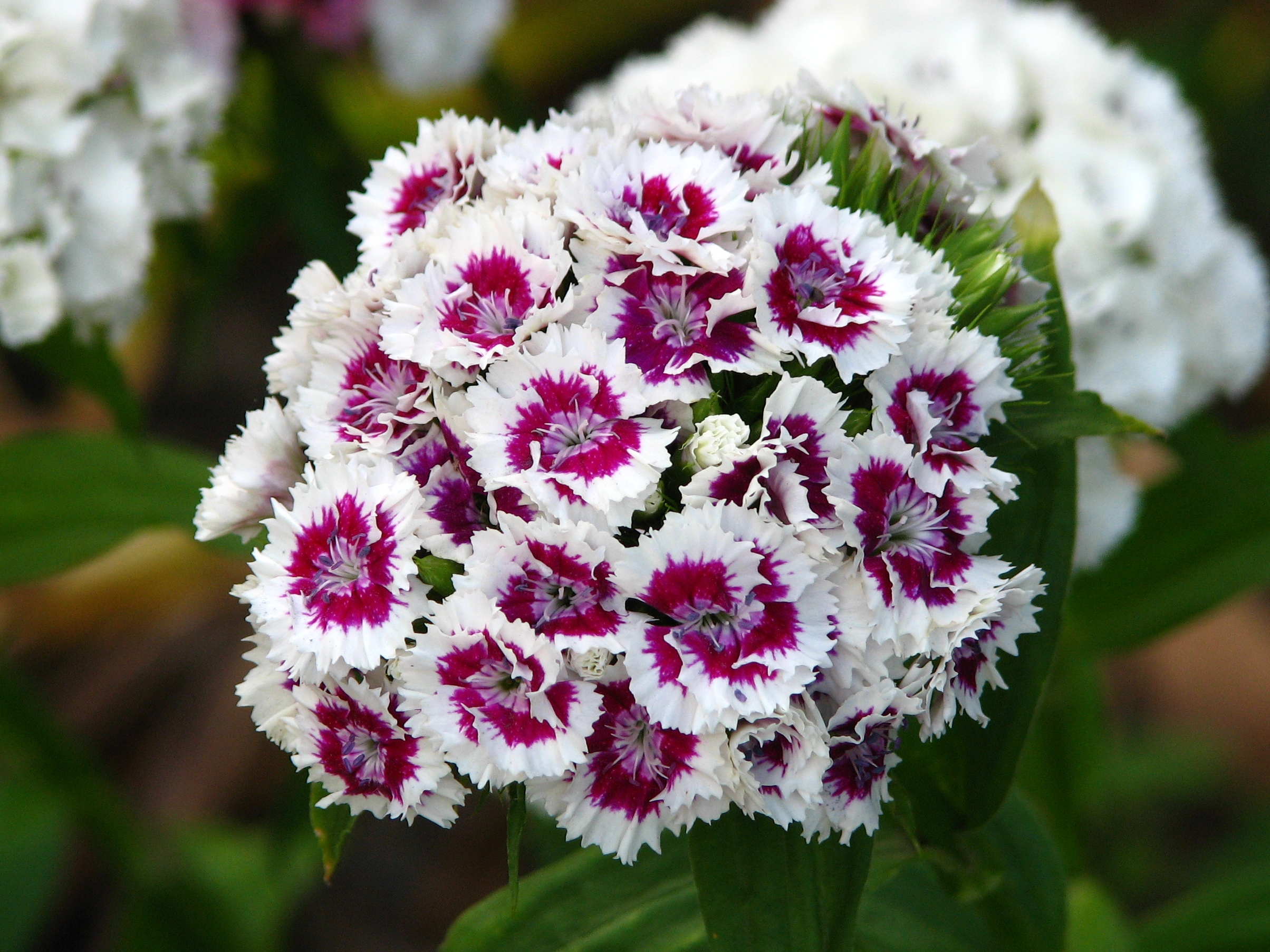
Sweet William, Dianthus barbatus

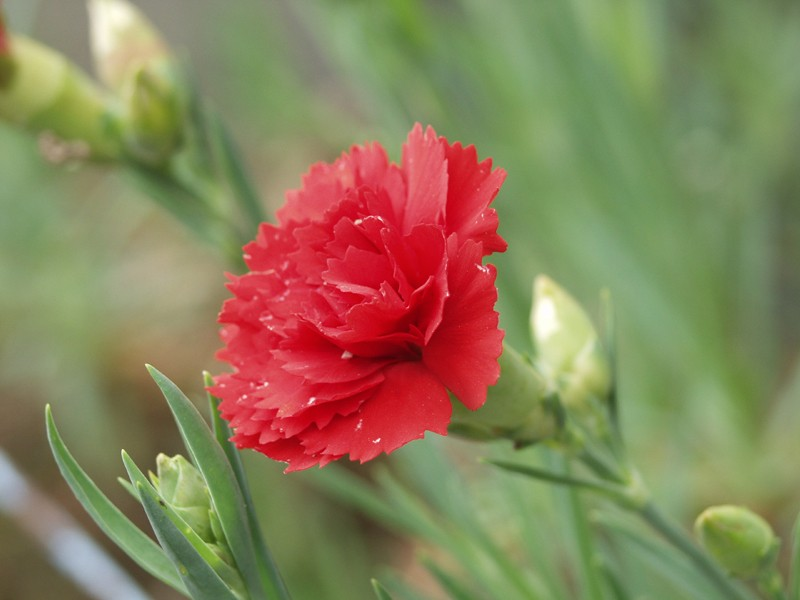
Carnation, Dianthus caryophyllus

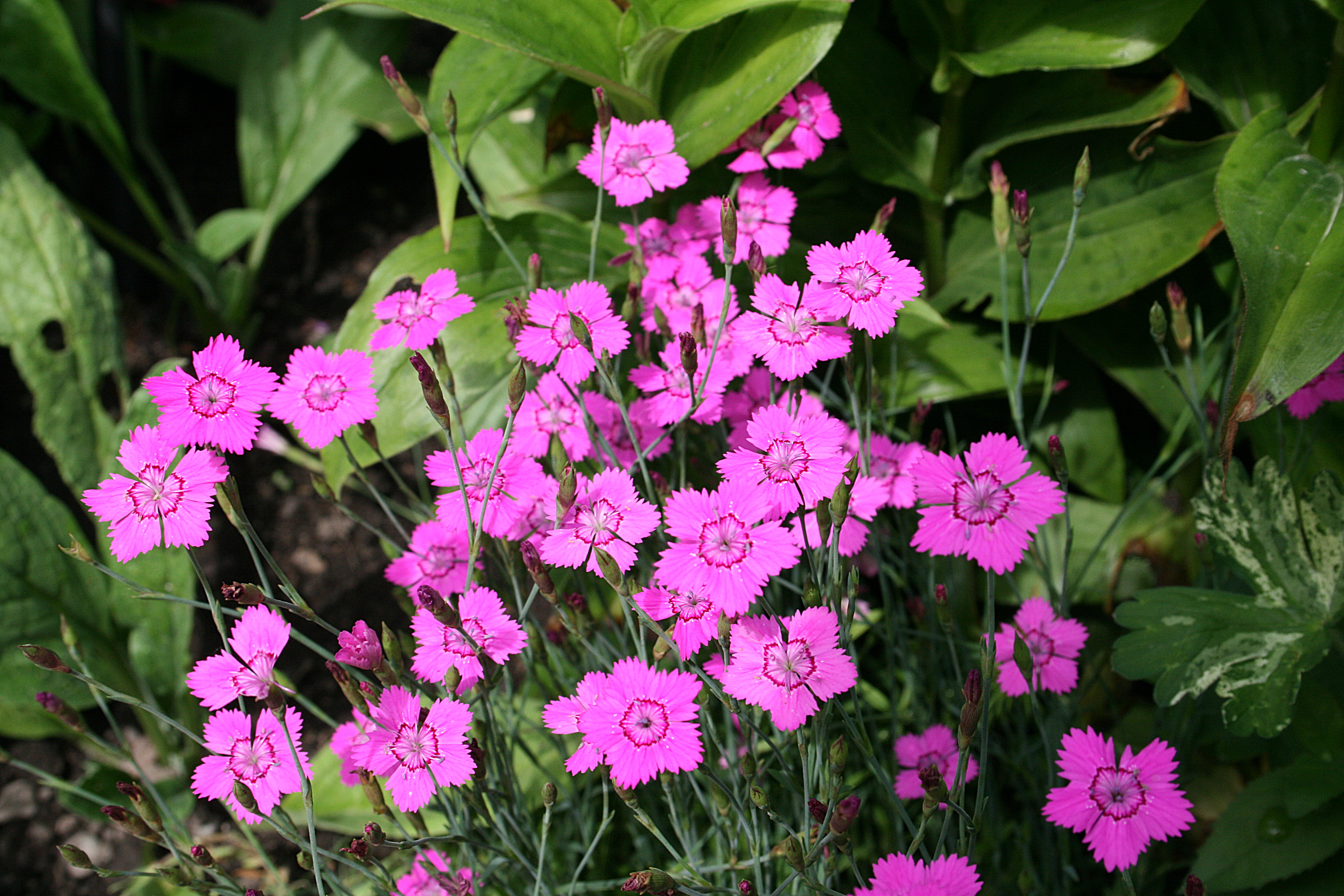
Maiden pink, Dianthus deltoides

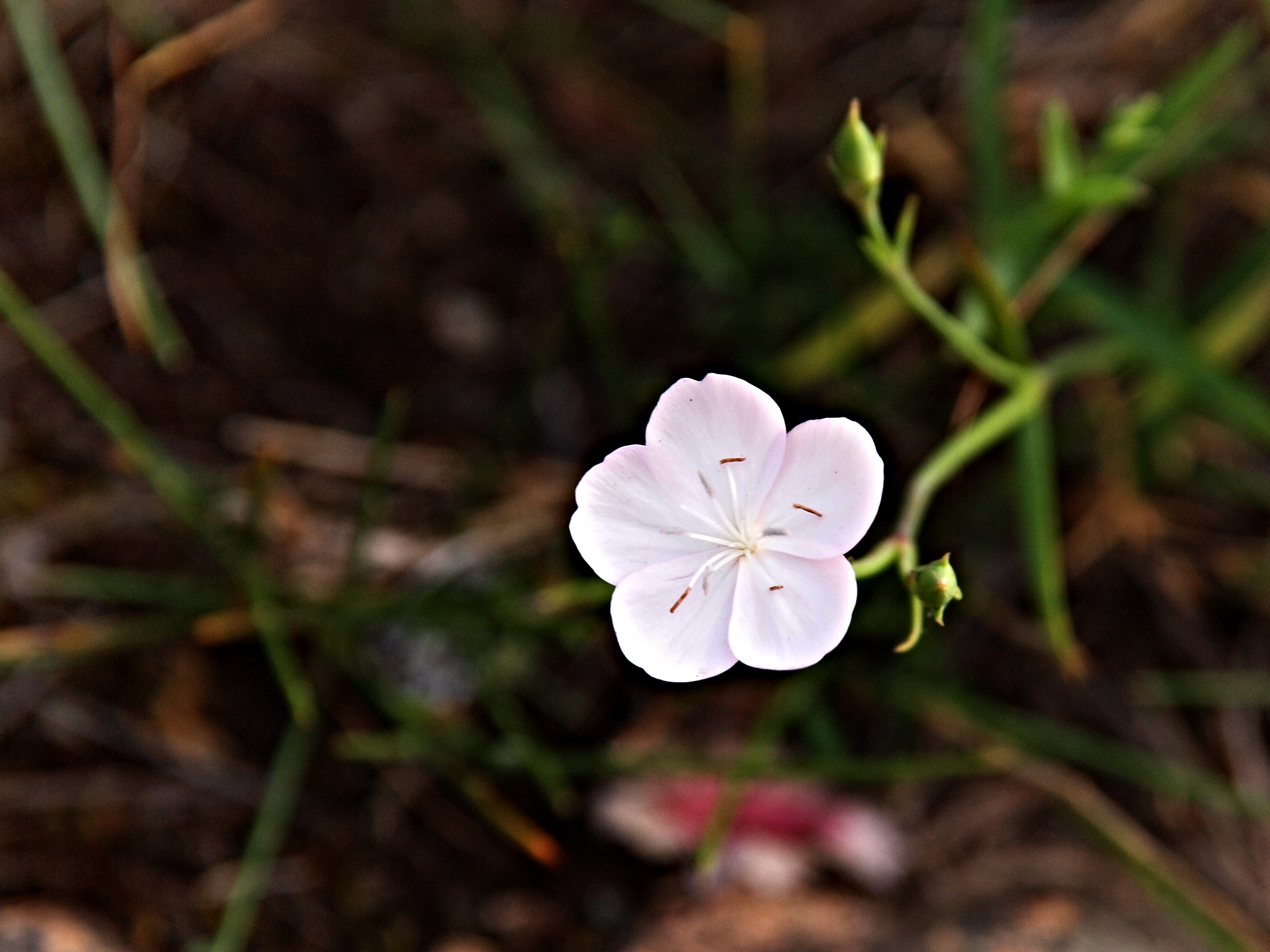
Dianthus furcatus

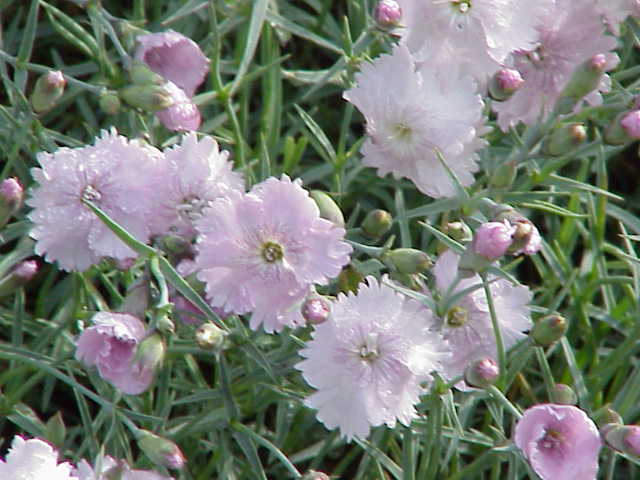
Cheddar pink, Dianthus gratianopolitanus

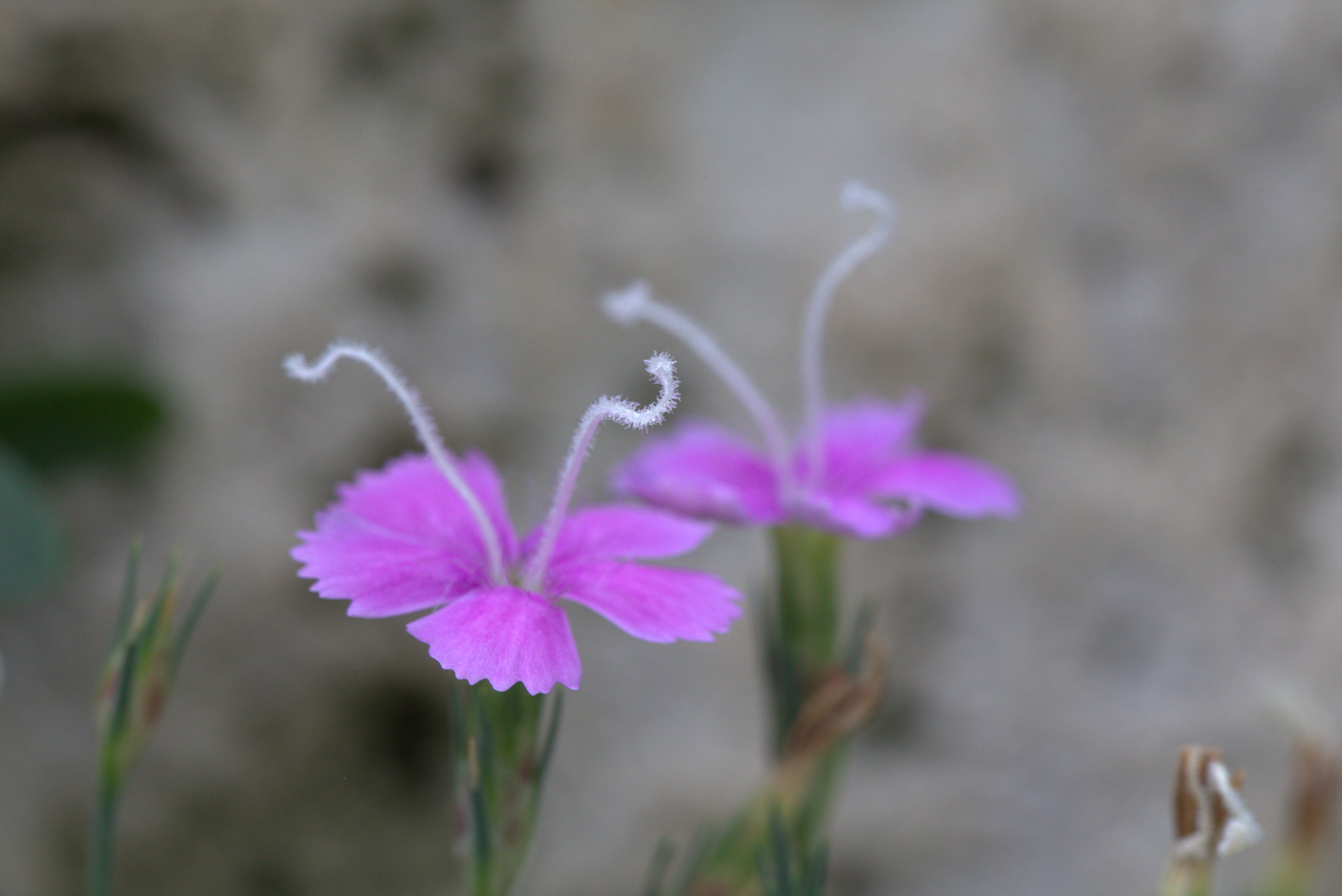
Dianthus engleri

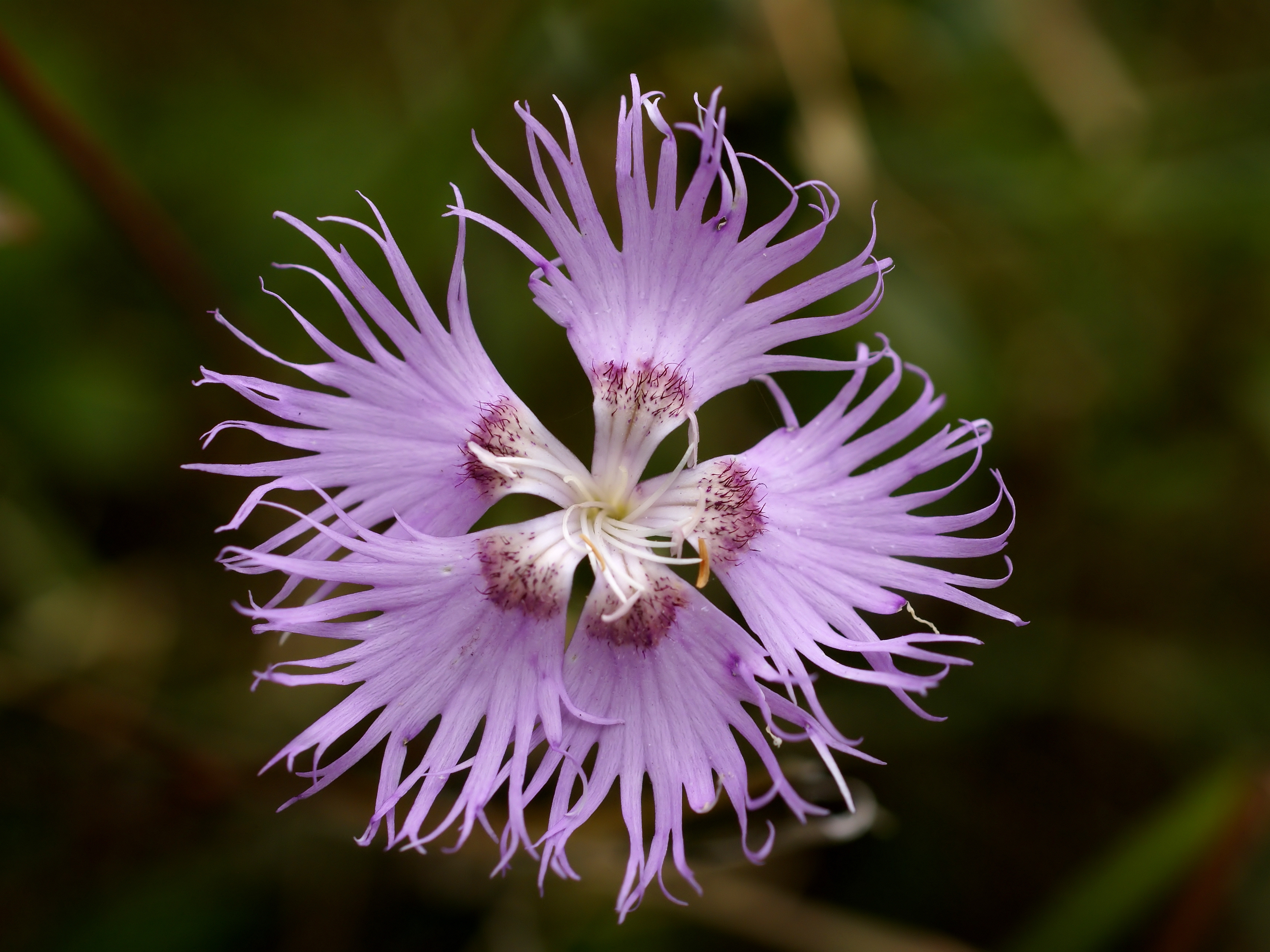
Fringed pink, Dianthus hyssopifolius

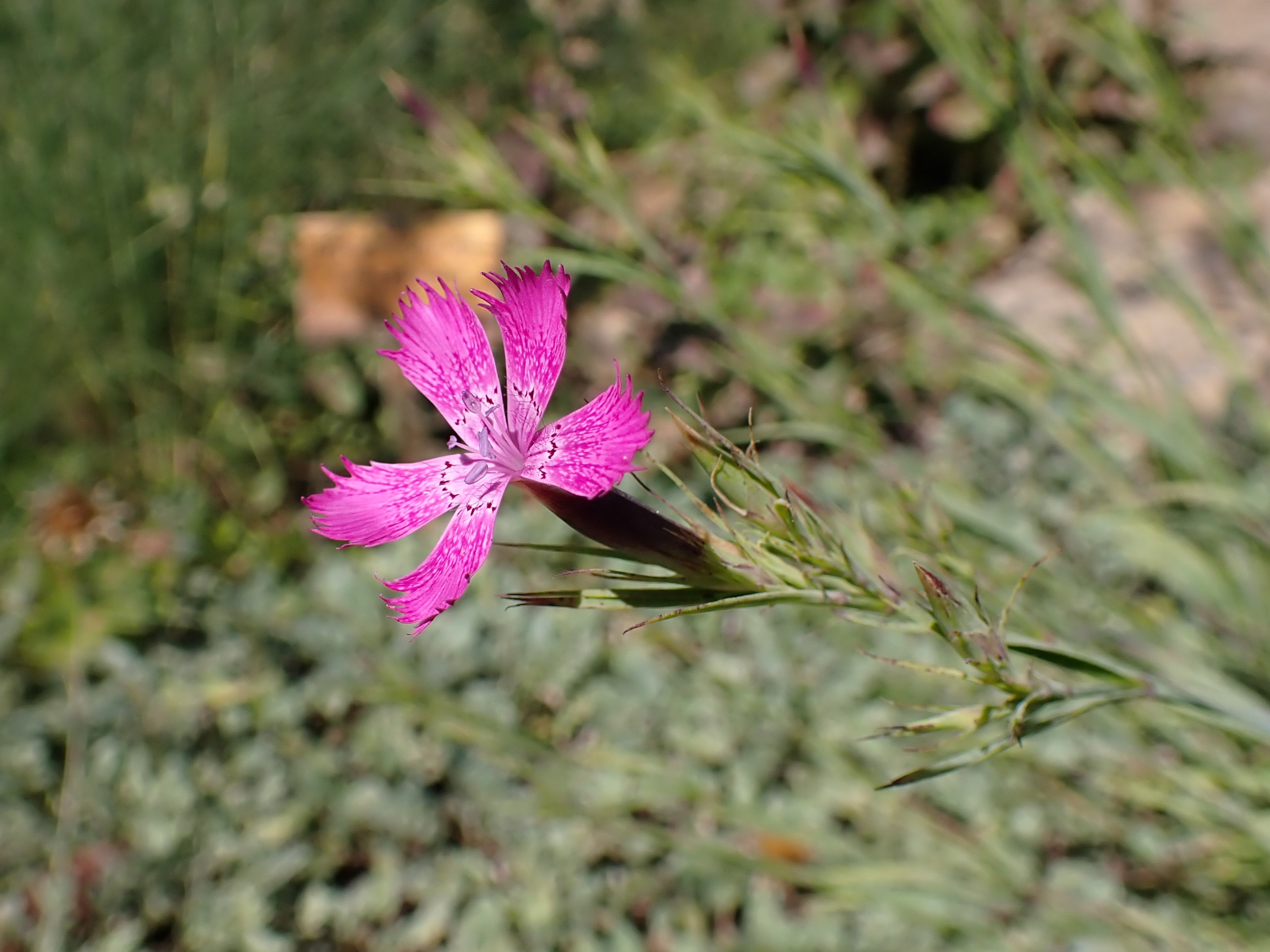
Dianthus imereticus

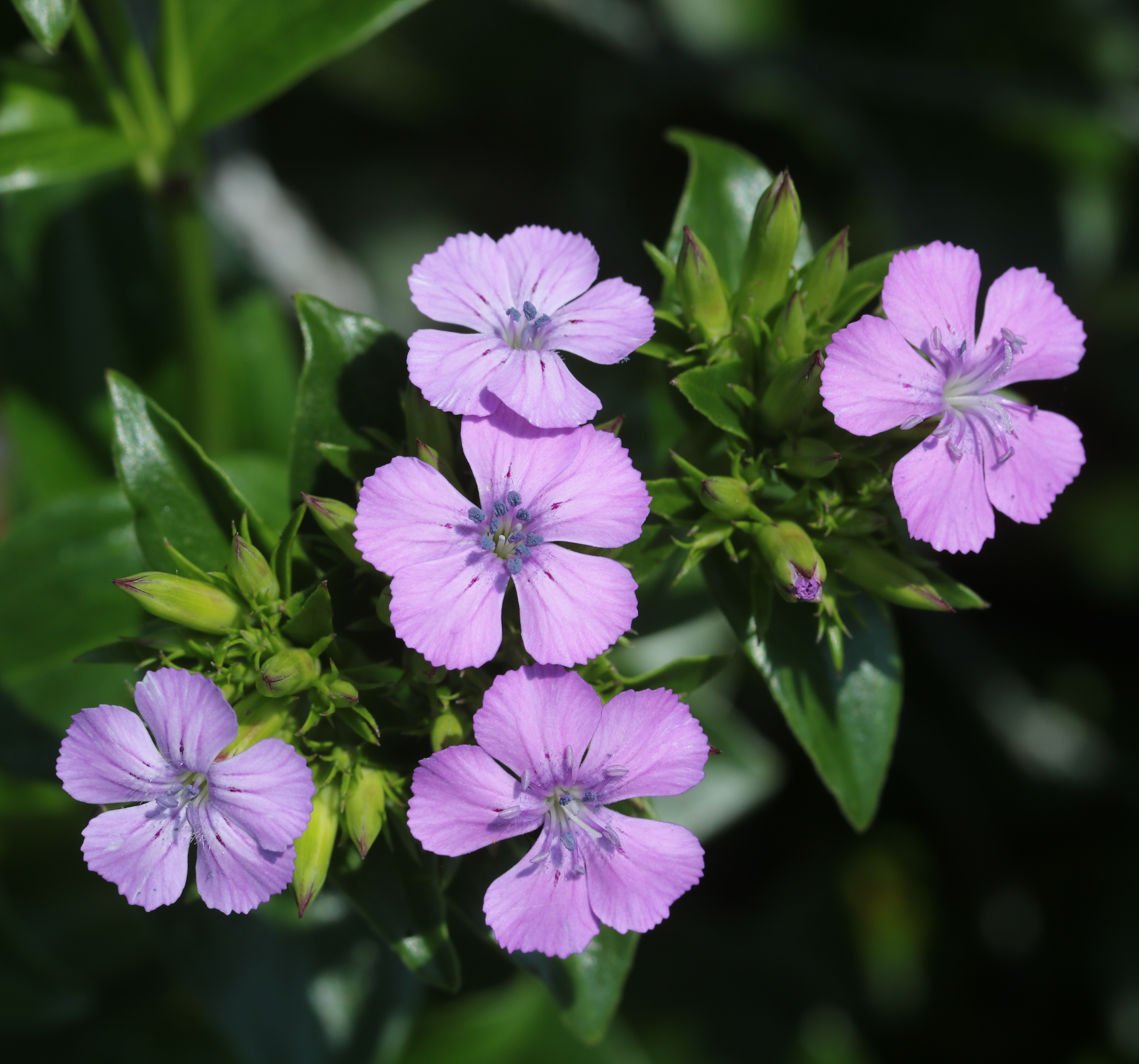
Seashore pink, Dianthus japonicus

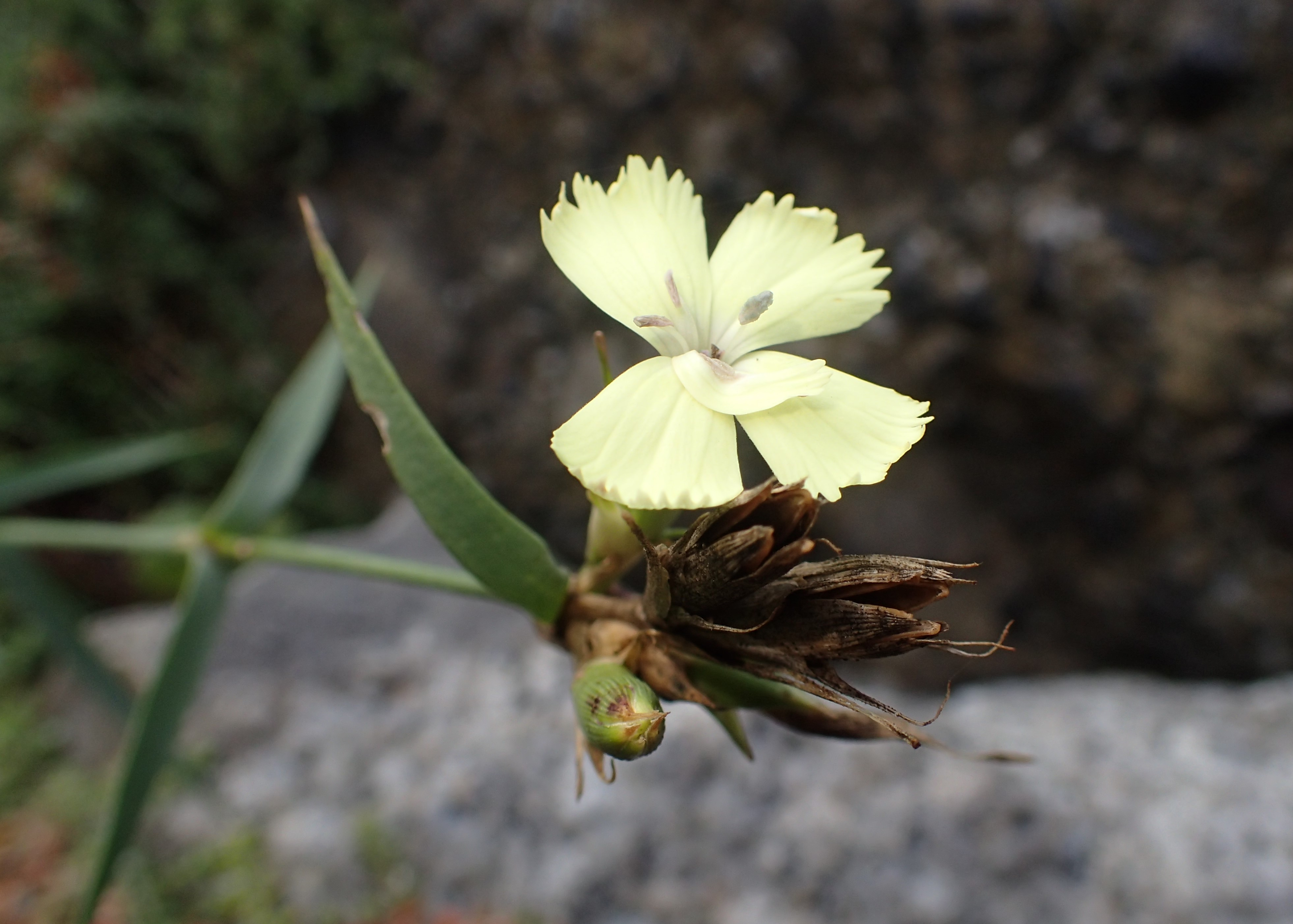
Dianthus knappii

- Dianthus acantholimonoides Schischk.
- Dianthus acicularis Fisch. ex Ledeb.
- Dianthus acrochlorus Stapf
- Dianthus aculeatus Hamzaoğlu
- Dianthus afghanicus Rech.f.
- Dianthus agrostolepis Rech.f.
- Dianthus akdaghensis Gemici & Leblebici
- Dianthus albens Aiton
- Dianthus algetanus Graells ex F.N.Williams
- Dianthus alpinus L.
- Dianthus altaicus L.X.Dong & Chang Y.Yang
- Dianthus anatolicus Boiss.
- Dianthus ancyrensis Hausskn. & Bornm.
- Dianthus andronakii Woronow ex Schischk.
- Dianthus androsaceus (Boiss. & Heldr.) Hayek
- Dianthus angolensis Hiern ex F.N.Williams
- Dianthus angrenicus Vved.
- Dianthus angulatus Royle
- Dianthus angustifolia Charit.
- Dianthus antalyensis Fassou, N.Korotkova, Dimop. & Borsch
- Dianthus anticarius Boiss. & Reut.
- Dianthus arenarius L.
- Dianthus argentii (Meikle) ined.
- Dianthus armeria L.
- Dianthus arpadianus Ade & Bornm.
- Dianthus arrostoi C.Presl
- Dianthus × artignanii Sennen
- Dianthus aticii Hamzaoğlu
- Dianthus atlanticus Pomel
- Dianthus atschurensis Sosn.
- Dianthus austroiranicus Lemperg
- Dianthus awaricus Kharadze
- Dianthus aydogdui Menemen & Hamzaoğlu
- Dianthus aytachii C.Vural
- Dianthus balansae Boiss.
- Dianthus balbisii Ser.
- Dianthus barbatus L.
- Dianthus basianicus Boiss. & Hausskn.
- Dianthus basuticus Burtt Davy
- Dianthus × belkinii S.V.Smirn. & Shmakov
- Dianthus benearnensis Loret
- Dianthus berkayorum Kandemir, Aytaç & T.Ertuğrul
- Dianthus bessarabicus (Kleopow) Klokov
- Dianthus bicolor Adams
- Dianthus biflorus Sm.
- Dianthus bolusii Burtt Davy
- Dianthus borbasii Vandas
- Dianthus borbonicus Brullo, C.Brullo, Colombo, Giusso, Ilardi & R.Perrone
- Dianthus brachycalyx A.Huet & É.Huet ex Bacch., Brullo, Casti & Giusso
- Dianthus brevicaulis Fenzl
- Dianthus brevipetalus Vved.
- Dianthus broteri Boiss. & Reut.
- Dianthus brutius Brullo, Scelsi & Spamp.
- Dianthus burchellii Ser.
- Dianthus burdurensis Hamzaoğlu & Koç
- Dianthus busambrae Soldano & F.Conti
- Dianthus cachemiricus Edgew. & Hook.f.
- Dianthus caespitosus Thunb.
- Dianthus callizonus Schott & Kotschy
- Dianthus campestris M.Bieb.
- Dianthus candicus (P.W.Ball & Heywood) Madhani & Heubl
- Dianthus canescens K.Koch
- Dianthus capitatus J.St.-Hil.
- Dianthus carbonatus Klokov
- Dianthus carmelitarum Reut. ex Boiss.
- Dianthus carthusianorum L.
- Dianthus caryophyllus L.
- Dianthus caucaseus Sims
- Dianthus charidemi Pau
- Dianthus chimanimaniensis S.S.Hooper
- Dianthus chinensis L.
- Dianthus chouardii Dobignard
- Dianthus cibrarius Clementi
- Dianthus ciliatus Guss.
- Dianthus × cincinnatus Lem.
- Dianthus cinnamomeus Sm.
- Dianthus cintranus Boiss. & Reut.
- Dianthus collinus Waldst. & Kit.
- Dianthus corymbosus Sm.
- Dianthus costae Willk.
- Dianthus × courtoisii Rchb.
- Dianthus crenatus Thunb.
- Dianthus cretaceus Adams
- Dianthus crinitus Sm.
- Dianthus crossopetalus (Fenzl ex Boiss.) Grossh.
- Dianthus cruentus Griseb.
- Dianthus cyathophorus Moris
- Dianthus cyprius A.K.Jacks. & Turrill
- Dianthus cyri Fisch. & C.A.Mey.
- Dianthus daghestanicus Kharadze
- Dianthus darvazicus Lincz.
- Dianthus deltoides L.
- Dianthus denaicus Assadi
- Dianthus deserti Kotschy
- Dianthus desideratus Strid
- Dianthus diffusus Sm.
- Dianthus × digeneus Borbás
- Dianthus dilepis Rech.f.
- Dianthus diversifolius Assadi
- Dianthus dobrogensis Prodan
- Dianthus × dufftii Hausskn. ex Asch.
- Dianthus dumanii Hamzaoğlu
- Dianthus edetanus (M.B.Crespo & Mateo) M.B.Crespo & Mateo
- Dianthus elatus Bunge
- Dianthus elbrusensis Kharadze
- Dianthus elegans d'Urv.
- Dianthus elymaiticus Hausskn. & Bornm.
- Dianthus engleri Hausskn. & Bornm.
- Dianthus eretmopetalus Stapf
- Dianthus ernesti-mayeri Micevski & Matevski
- Dianthus erythrocoleus Boiss.
- Dianthus eugeniae Kleopow
- Dianthus excelsus S.S.Hooper
- Dianthus falconeri Edgew. & Hook.f.
- Dianthus × fallens Timb.-Lagr.
- Dianthus fasciculatus (Boiss.) Fassou, N.Korotkova, Dimop. & Borsch
- Dianthus ferrugineus Mill.
- Dianthus floribundus Boiss.
- Dianthus formanekii Borbás ex Formánek
- Dianthus fragrans Steven ex Adams
- Dianthus freynii Vandas
- Dianthus fruticosus L.
- Dianthus furcatus Balb.
- Dianthus gabrielianae Nersesian
- Dianthus galicicae Micevski
- Dianthus gasparrinii Guss.
- Dianthus genargenteus Bacch., Brullo, Casti & Giusso
- Dianthus giganteiformis (Borbás) Heinr.Braun
- Dianthus giganteus d'Urv.
- Dianthus glacialis Haenke
- Dianthus glutinosus Boiss. & Heldr.
- Dianthus goekayi Kaynak, Yılmaz & Daşkın
- Dianthus goerkii Hartvig & Å.Strid
- Dianthus gracilis Sm.
- Dianthus graminifolius C.Presl
- Dianthus graniticus Jord.
- Dianthus gratianopolitanus Vill.
- Dianthus grossheimii Schischk.
- Dianthus guessfeldtianus Muschl.
- Dianthus guliae Janka
- Dianthus guttatus M.Bieb.
- Dianthus gyspergerae Rouy
- Dianthus haematocalyx Boiss. & Heldr.
- Dianthus hafezii Assadi
- Dianthus halisdemirii Hamzaoğlu & Koç
- Dianthus hamzaoglui Koç
- Dianthus harrissii Rech.f.
- Dianthus helenae Vved.
- Dianthus × hellwigii Borbás ex Čelak.
- Dianthus × helveticorum M.Laínz
- Dianthus henteri Heuff. ex Griseb. & Schenk
- Dianthus hispidus (Boiss. & Balansa) Fassou, N.Korotkova, Dimop. & Borsch
- Dianthus holopetalus Turcz.
- Dianthus humilis Willd. ex Ledeb.
- Dianthus hymenolepis Boiss.
- Dianthus hypanicus Andrz.
- Dianthus hyrcanicus Rech.f.
- Dianthus hyssopifolius L.
- Dianthus ichnusae Bacch., Brullo, Casti & Giusso
- Dianthus illyricus (Ard.) Fassou, N.Korotkova, Dimop. & Borsch
- Dianthus imereticus (Rupr.) Schischk.
- Dianthus inamoenus Schischk.
- Dianthus ingoldbyi Turrill
- Dianthus inodorus (L.) Gaertn.
- Dianthus inoxianus Gallego
- Dianthus insularis Bacch., Brullo, Casti & Giusso
- Dianthus integer Vis.
- Dianthus integerrimus Bunge
- Dianthus jacobsii Rech.f.
- Dianthus jacquemontii Edgew. & Hook.f.
- Dianthus × jaczonis Asch.
- Dianthus japigicus Bianco & S.Brullo
- Dianthus japonicus Thunb.
- Dianthus jaroslavii Galushko
- Dianthus × javorkae Kárpáti
- Dianthus juniperinus Sm.
- Dianthus juzeptchukii M.L.Kuzmina
- Dianthus kapinaensis Markgr. & Lindtner
- Dianthus karami (Boiss.) Mouterde
- Dianthus karataviensis Pavlov
- Dianthus kastembeluensis Freyn & Sint.
- Dianthus khamiesbergensis Sond.
- Dianthus kirghizicus Schischk.
- Dianthus kiusianus Makino
- Dianthus klokovii Knjasev
- Dianthus knappii Asch. & Kanitz
- Dianthus koreanus D.C.Son & K.H.Lee
- Dianthus kremeri Boiss. & Reut.
- Dianthus kubanensis Schischk.
- Dianthus kuschakewiczii Regel & Schmalh.
- Dianthus kusnezowii Marcow.
- Dianthus lactiflorus Fenzl
- Dianthus laingsburgensis S.S.Hooper
- Dianthus lanceolatus Steven ex Rchb.
- Dianthus langeanus Willk.
- Dianthus laricifolius Boiss. & Reut.
- Dianthus legionensis (Willk.) F.N.Williams
- Dianthus leptoloma Steud. ex A.Rich.
- Dianthus leptopetalus Willd.
- Dianthus leucophaeus Sm.
- Dianthus leucophoeniceus Dörfl. & Hayek
- Dianthus libanotis Labill.
- Dianthus lindbergii Riedl
- Dianthus longicalyx Miq.
- Dianthus longiglumis Delile
- Dianthus longivaginatus Rech.f.
- Dianthus × lorberi Kubát & Abtová
- Dianthus × lucae Asch.
- Dianthus lusitanus Brot.
- Dianthus lydus Boiss.
- Dianthus macranthoides Hausskn. ex Bornm.
- Dianthus macranthus Boiss.
- Dianthus macroflorus Hamzaoğlu
- Dianthus magnipetala Charit.
- Dianthus mainensis Shaulo & Erst
- Dianthus × mansanetianus Mateo
- Dianthus marschallii Schischk.
- Dianthus martuniensis M.L.Kuzmina
- Dianthus masmenaeus Boiss.
- Dianthus mazanderanicus Rech.f.
- Dianthus × melandrioides Pau
- Dianthus membranaceus Borbás
- Dianthus mercurii Heldr.
- Dianthus micranthus Boiss. & Heldr.
- Dianthus microlepis Boiss.
- Dianthus micropetalus Ser.
- Dianthus moesiacus Vis. & Pančić
- Dianthus monadelphus Vent.
- Dianthus monspessulanus L.
- Dianthus morisianus Vals.
- Dianthus mossanus Bacch. & Brullo
- Dianthus moviensis F.N.Williams
- Dianthus muglensis Hamzaoğlu & Koç
- Dianthus multiceps Costa ex Willk.
- Dianthus multiflorus Deniz & Aykurt
- Dianthus multisquamatus F.N.Williams
- Dianthus multisquameus Bondarenko & R.M.Vinogr.
- Dianthus muschianus Kotschy ex Boiss.
- Dianthus myrtinervius Griseb.
- Dianthus namaensis Schinz
- Dianthus nangarharicus Rech.f.
- Dianthus nanshanicus Chang Y.Yang & L.X.Dong
- Dianthus nardiformis Janka
- Dianthus nezahatiae Hamzaoğlu
- Dianthus nihatii Güner
- Dianthus nitidus Waldst. & Kit.
- Dianthus nodosus Tausch
- Dianthus nudiflorus Griff.
- Dianthus oliastrae Bacch., Brullo, Casti & Giusso
- Dianthus orientalis Adams
- Dianthus oschtenicus Galushko
- Dianthus × ossetianus P.P.Ferrer & E.Laguna
- Dianthus pachygonus (Fisch. & C.A.Mey.) Fassou, N.Korotkova, Dimop. & Borsch
- Dianthus paghmanicus Rech.f.
- Dianthus palinensis S.S.Ying
- Dianthus pallens M.Bieb.
- Dianthus pamiralaicus Lincz.
- Dianthus pancicii Velen.
- Dianthus patentisquameus Bondarenko & R.M.Vinogr.
- Dianthus pavlovii Lazkov
- Dianthus pavonius Tausch
- Dianthus pelviformis Heuff.
- Dianthus pendulus Boiss. & C.I.Blanche
- Dianthus persicus Hausskn.
- Dianthus petraeus Waldst. & Kit.
- Dianthus pinifolius Sm.
- Dianthus plumarius L.
- Dianthus plumbeus Schischk.
- Dianthus polycladus Boiss.
- Dianthus polylepis Bien. ex Boiss.
- Dianthus polymorphus M.Bieb.
- Dianthus praecox Willd. ex Spreng.
- Dianthus pratensis M.Bieb.
- Dianthus pseudarmeria M.Bieb.
- Dianthus pseudocrinitus Behrooz. & Joharchi
- Dianthus pseudorigidus (Hub.-Mor.) Fassou, N.Korotkova, Dimop. & Borsch
- Dianthus pungens L.
- Dianthus purpureimaculatus Podlech
- Dianthus pygmaeus Hayata
- Dianthus pyrenaicus Pourr.
- Dianthus quadridentatus (Sm.) Fassou, N.Korotkova, Dimop. & Borsch
- Dianthus raddeanus Vierh.
- Dianthus ramosissimus Pall. ex Poir.
- Dianthus raridentata Charit.
- Dianthus recta Charit.
- Dianthus recticaulis Ledeb.
- Dianthus repens Willd.
- Dianthus rigidus M.Bieb.
- Dianthus robustus Boiss. & Kotschy
- Dianthus roseoluteus Velen.
- Dianthus rudbaricus Assadi
- Dianthus rupicola Biv.
- Dianthus ruprechtii Schischk. ex Grossh.
- Dianthus sachalinensis Barkalov & Prob.
- Dianthus saetabensis Rouy
- Dianthus sahandicus Assadi
- Dianthus sancarii Hamzaoğlu & Koç
- Dianthus sardous Bacch., Brullo, Casti & Giusso
- Dianthus × saxatilis F.W.Schmidt
- Dianthus scaber Chaix
- Dianthus scardicus Wettst.
- Dianthus schemachensis Schischk.
- Dianthus seguieri Vill.
- Dianthus seidlitzii Boiss.
- Dianthus semenovii (Regel & Herder) Vierh.
- Dianthus seravschanicus Schischk.
- Dianthus serotinus Waldst. & Kit.
- Dianthus serpentinus Hamzaoğlu
- Dianthus serratifolius Sm.
- Dianthus serrulatus Desf.
- Dianthus sessiliflorus Boiss.
- Dianthus setisquameus Hausskn. & Bornm.
- Dianthus shinanensis (Yatabe) Makino
- Dianthus siculus C.Presl
- Dianthus simulans Stoj. & Stef. ex Stef. & Jordanov
- Dianthus sinaicus Boiss.
- Dianthus siphonocalyx Blakelock
- Dianthus somanus Oskay
- Dianthus sphacioticus Boiss. & Heldr.
- Dianthus spiculifolius Schur
- Dianthus squarrosus M.Bieb.
- Dianthus stamatiadae Rech.f.
- Dianthus stapfii Lemperg
- Dianthus stellaris Camarda
- Dianthus stenocephalus Boiss.
- Dianthus stenopetalus Griseb.
- Dianthus stepanovae Barkalov & Prob.
- Dianthus sternbergii Sieber ex Capelli
- Dianthus stramineus Boiss. & Heldr.
- Dianthus stribrnyi Velen.
- Dianthus strictus Banks & Sol.
- Dianthus strymonis Rech.f.
- Dianthus subacaulis Vill.
- Dianthus subaphyllus (Lemperg) Rech.f.
- Dianthus × subfissus Rouy & Foucaud
- Dianthus subscabridus Lincz.
- Dianthus subulosus Conrath & Freyn
- Dianthus superbus L.
- Dianthus sylvestris Wulfen
- Dianthus szowitsianus Boiss.
- Dianthus takhtajanii Nersesian
- Dianthus talyschensis Boiss. & Buhse
- Dianthus taoshanensis S.S.Ying
- Dianthus tarentinus Lacaita
- Dianthus tenuiflorus Griseb.
- Dianthus thunbergii S.S.Hooper
- Dianthus tlaratensis Husseinov
- Dianthus toletanus Boiss. & Reut.
- Dianthus transcaucasicus Schischk.
- Dianthus transvaalensis Burtt Davy
- Dianthus trifasciculatus Kit. ex Schult.
- Dianthus tripunctatus Sm.
- Dianthus tymphresteus (Boiss. & Spruner) Heldr. & Sartori ex Boiss.
- Dianthus ucarii Hamzaoğlu & Koç
- Dianthus ugamicus Vved.
- Dianthus uniflorus Forssk.
- Dianthus uralensis Korsh.
- Dianthus urumoffii Stoj. & Acht.
- Dianthus uzbekistanicus Lincz.
- Dianthus vanensis Behçet & İlçim
- Dianthus varankii Hamzaoğlu & Koç
- Dianthus vigoi M.Laínz
- Dianthus virgatus Pasq.
- Dianthus virgineus L.
- Dianthus viridescens Clementi
- Dianthus viscidus Bory & Chaub.
- Dianthus vladimirii Galushko
- Dianthus volgicus Juz.
- Dianthus vulturius Guss. & Ten.
- Dianthus × warionii Bucq. & Timb.-Lagr.
- Dianthus webbianus Parl. ex Vis.
- Dianthus woroschilovii Barkalov & Prob.
- Dianthus xylorrhizus Boiss. & Heldr.
- Dianthus yilmazii Hamzaoğlu & Koç
- Dianthus zangezuricus Nersesian
- Dianthus zederbaueri Vierh.
- Dianthus zeyheri Sond.
- Dianthus zonatus Fenzl
