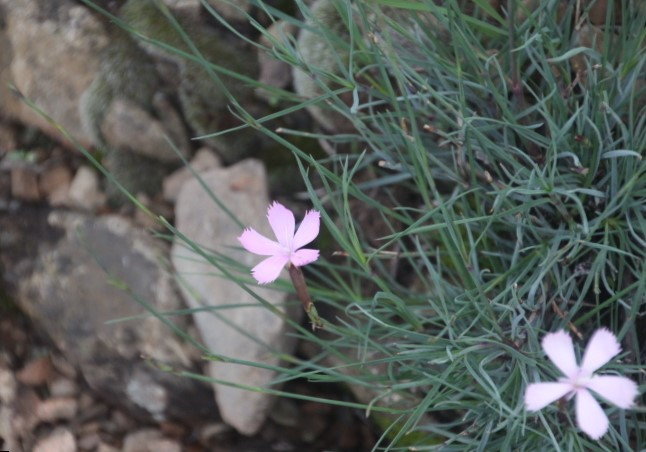

Scientific classification
- Kingdom: Plantae
- Clade: Tracheophytes
- Clade: Angiosperms
- Clade: Eudicots
- Order: Caryophyllales
- Family: Caryophyllaceae
- Genus: Dianthus
- Species: D. thunbergii

Binomial name
- Dianthus thunbergii S.S.Hooper, 1959

Synonyms
- Dianthus scaber Turcz.

= Dianthus thunbergii =

Species of flowering plant

Dianthus thunbergii (Thunberg's wild pink) is a species of flowering plant in the family Caryophyllaceae.

It is indigenous to the southwestern Cape, South Africa, where it occurs on rocky slopes from Swellendam in the Western Cape, eastwards into the Eastern Cape Province.

== Description ==
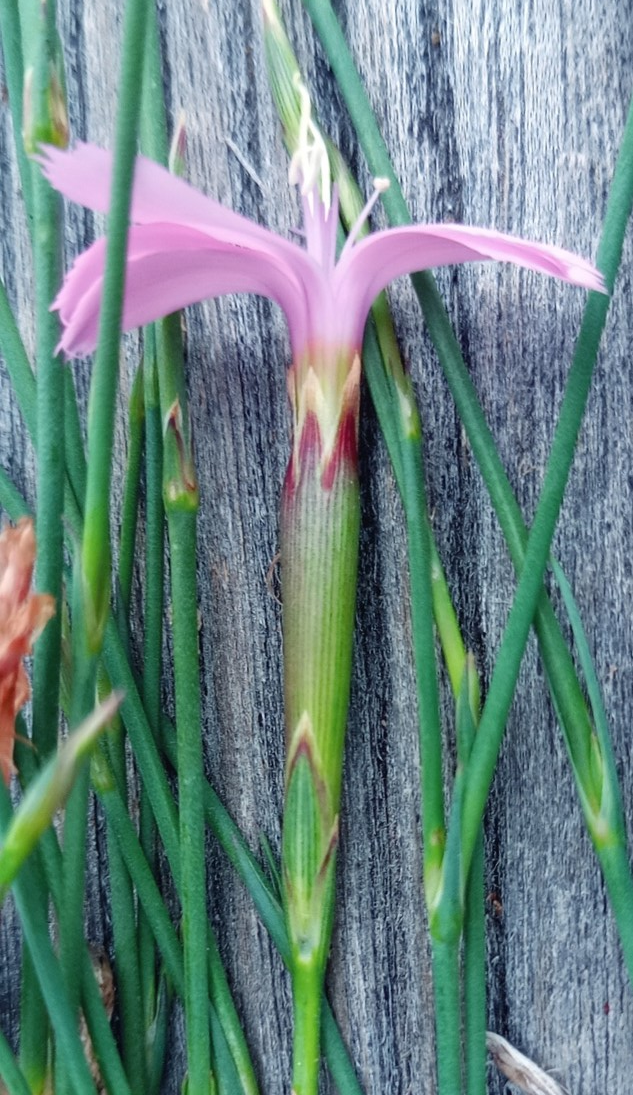
Detail of the Dianthus thunbergii calyx

Dianthus thunbergii is a spreading or tufted herbaceous perennial reaching 40 cm, with linear (50mm x 3mm) blue-grey leaves.

The inflorescence is usually sparsely branched and rises c. 20cm above the plants, bearing 2-5 flowers.

The flowers are usually pink (sometimes white), 15mm wide, and appear in Spring-Summer (Sept-Feb.). The petals are shortly fimbriate to dentate.

The calyx is cylindrical and 20-30 mm in length. The lower half of the calyx is covered with 2-4 bract pairs. The bracts are lanceolate or acute to acuminate in shape.

=== Forms ===
In addition to the typical form, D. thunbergii forma maritimus is sometimes recognised for plants occurring in the Eastern Cape around Port Elizabeth (North end), Hillary and Port Alfred. This form is intermediate in appearance between D. thunbergii and D. albens.

=== Related species ===
In the far western extent of its distribution range, D. thunbergii co-occurs with a related species, Dianthus albens, but D. thunbergii can be distinguished from the latter species by a combination of its longer calyx (20-30 mm long, rather than 12-18 mm); by the narrower lobes at the tip of its calyx (narrowly ovate, rather than deltoid-ovate); by the shape of the bracts at the base of the calyx (lanceolate-elliptic, rather than ovate-elliptic); by the number of bract pairs at the base of the calyx (2-4, rather than 1-3); by its uniformly dentate to shortly fimbriate petal tips (rather than entire-crenulate to rarely shallowly dentate); and by its seed capsule not extending beyond the calyx when ripe.

It also co-occurs with another related species, Dianthus caespitosus, but D. thunbergii can be distinguished from the latter species by its calyx which is shorter (20-30 mm, rather than 32-65mm long).
