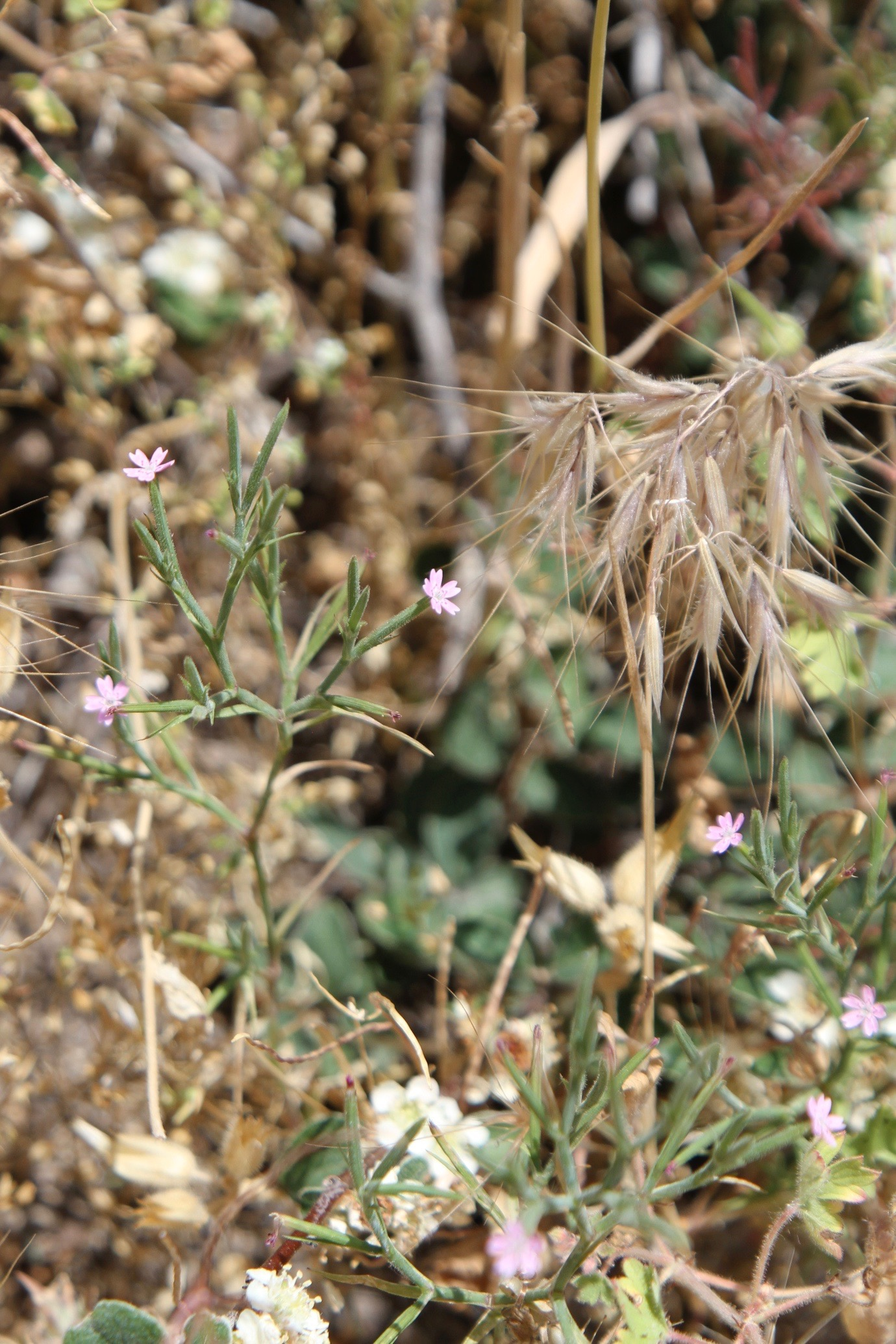

Scientific classification
- Kingdom: Plantae
- Clade: Tracheophytes
- Clade: Angiosperms
- Clade: Eudicots
- Order: Caryophyllales
- Family: Caryophyllaceae
- Genus: Dianthus
- Species: D. nudiflorus

Binomial name
- Dianthus nudiflorus Griff.

Synonyms
- Velezia rigida L.; Velezia rigida var. glabrata Regel; Velezia rigida var. sessiliflora F.N.Williams

= Dianthus nudiflorus =

Species of flowering plant

Dianthus nudiflorus, synonym Velezia rigida, is a species of flowering plant in the family Caryophyllaceae. It is native to the Mediterranean Basin countries of Europe and North Africa, and to western and central Asia and Pakistan. It is also present in northern California where it is an introduced species. It is an annual herb growing from a taproot and producing a hairy, glandular, branching green or purplish stem up to 40 centimeters tall. The linear leaves are up to 2 centimeters long. Solitary flowers occur in the leaf axils. Each flower has a very long, cylindrical, ribbed calyx of fused sepals forming the tubular throat of the flower, measuring at least a centimeter in length. At the top of the tube is the flower corolla which has five pink or purplish petals.

== Taxonomy ==
The species was first described by Carl Linnaeus in 1753 as Velezia rigida. Molecular phylogenetic analyses from 2010 onwards showed that the genus Dianthus was only monophyletic if Velezia was included. Velezia rigida was formally included in Dianthus in 2018, under the resurrected name Dianthus nudiflorus. The name Dianthus rigidus was already in use for a different species.
