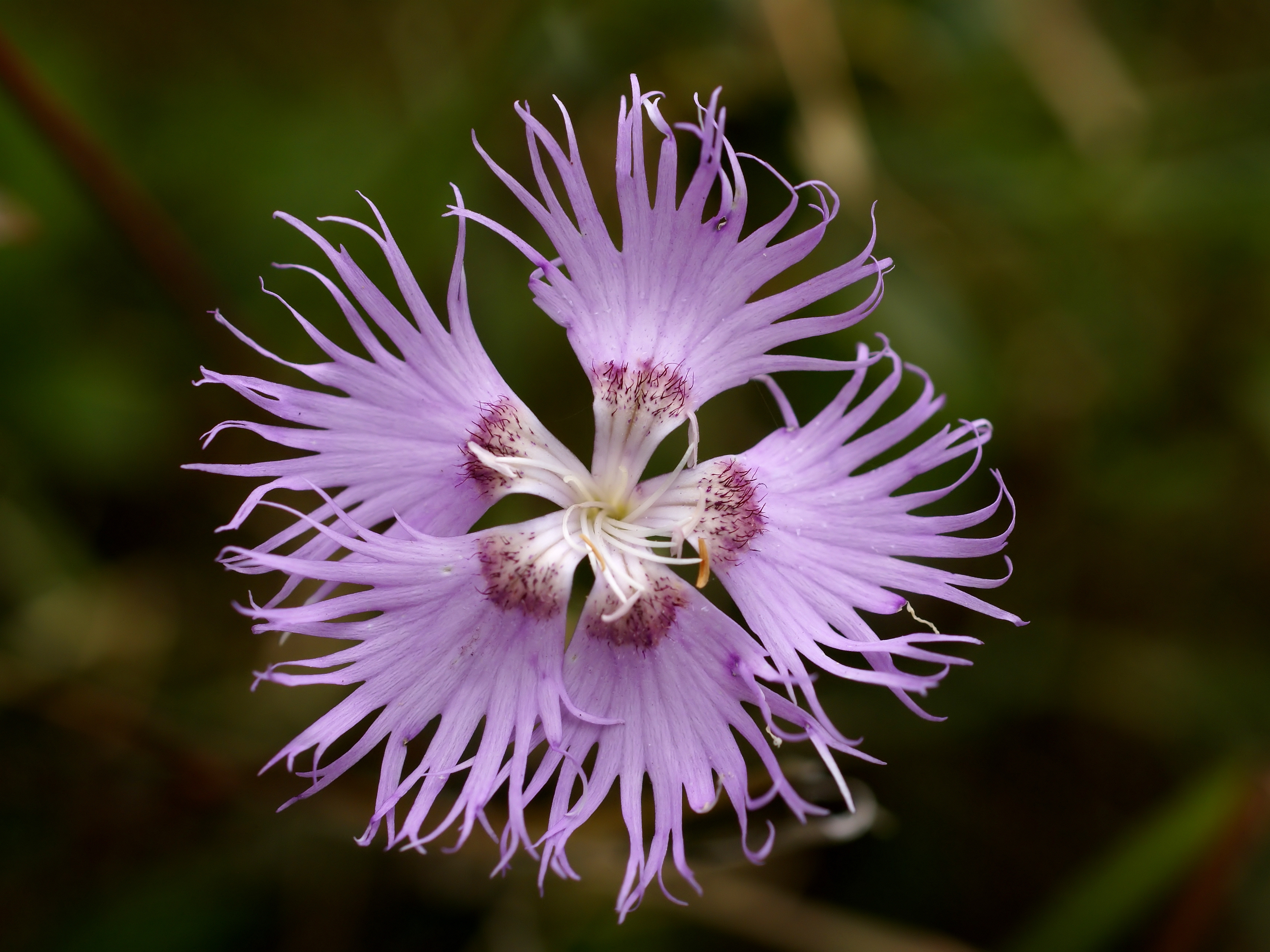
- Close-up of flower
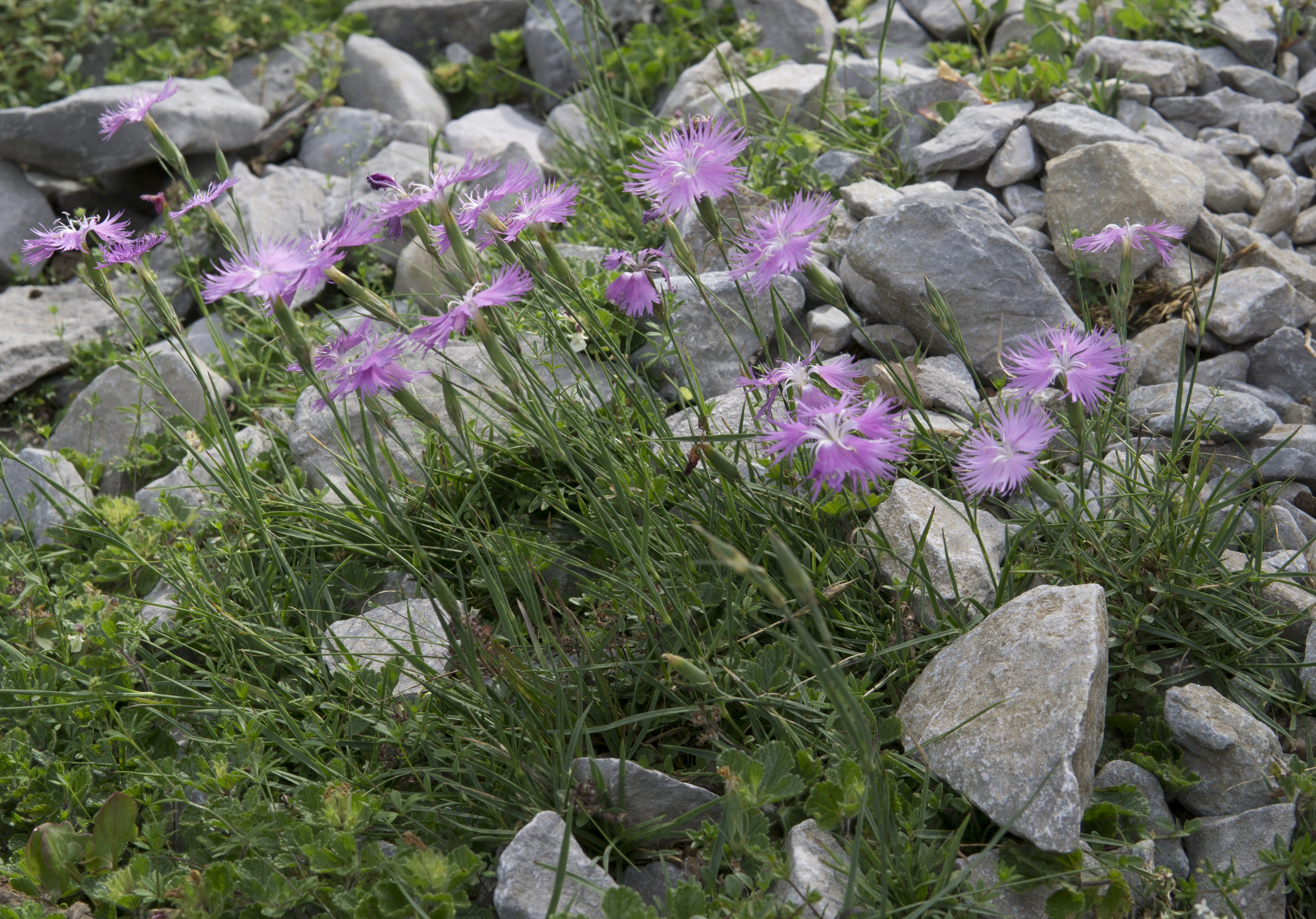
- In the Pyrenees

Scientific classification
- Kingdom: Plantae
- Clade: Tracheophytes
- Clade: Angiosperms
- Clade: Eudicots
- Order: Caryophyllales
- Family: Caryophyllaceae
- Genus: Dianthus
- Species: D. hyssopifolius

Binomial name
- Dianthus hyssopifolius L.

Synonyms
- List: Dianthus arenarius var. gallicus (Pers.) Lapeyr.; Dianthus fimbriatus var. monspeliacus (L.) Lam.; Dianthus gallicus Pers.; Dianthus monspeliacus L.; Dianthus monspeliacus subsp. gallicus (Pers.) M.Laínz & Muñoz Garm; Dianthus monspessulanus var. albidus Timb.-Lagr.; Dianthus monspessulanus var. barbatus St.-Lag.; Dianthus monspessulanus var. correvonis Sennen; Dianthus monspessulanus subsp. correvonis Sennen; Dianthus monspessulanus var. gallicus (Pers.) Pau; Dianthus monspessulanus var. latifolius Rouy & Foucaud; Dianthus monspessulanus var. monanthus Sennen; Dianthus monspessulanus var. oliganthus Sennen; Dianthus monspessulanus var. pentagonalis Merino; Dianthus monspessulanus var. plumosus W.D.J.Koch

= Dianthus hyssopifolius =

Species of plant

Dianthus hyssopifolius, the fringed pink (a name it shares with Dianthus superbus), is a species of flowering plant in the family Caryophyllaceae. It is native to Portugal, Spain, and France, and it has been introduced to Great Britain. A subshrub, it is available from commercial suppliers.

== Subtaxa ==
The following subspecies are accepted:

- Dianthus hyssopifolius subsp. gallicus (Pers.) M.Laínz & Muñoz Garm – Spain, France, introduced to Great Britain; called the Jersey pink
- Dianthus hyssopifolius subsp. hyssopifolius – Portugal, Spain, France
