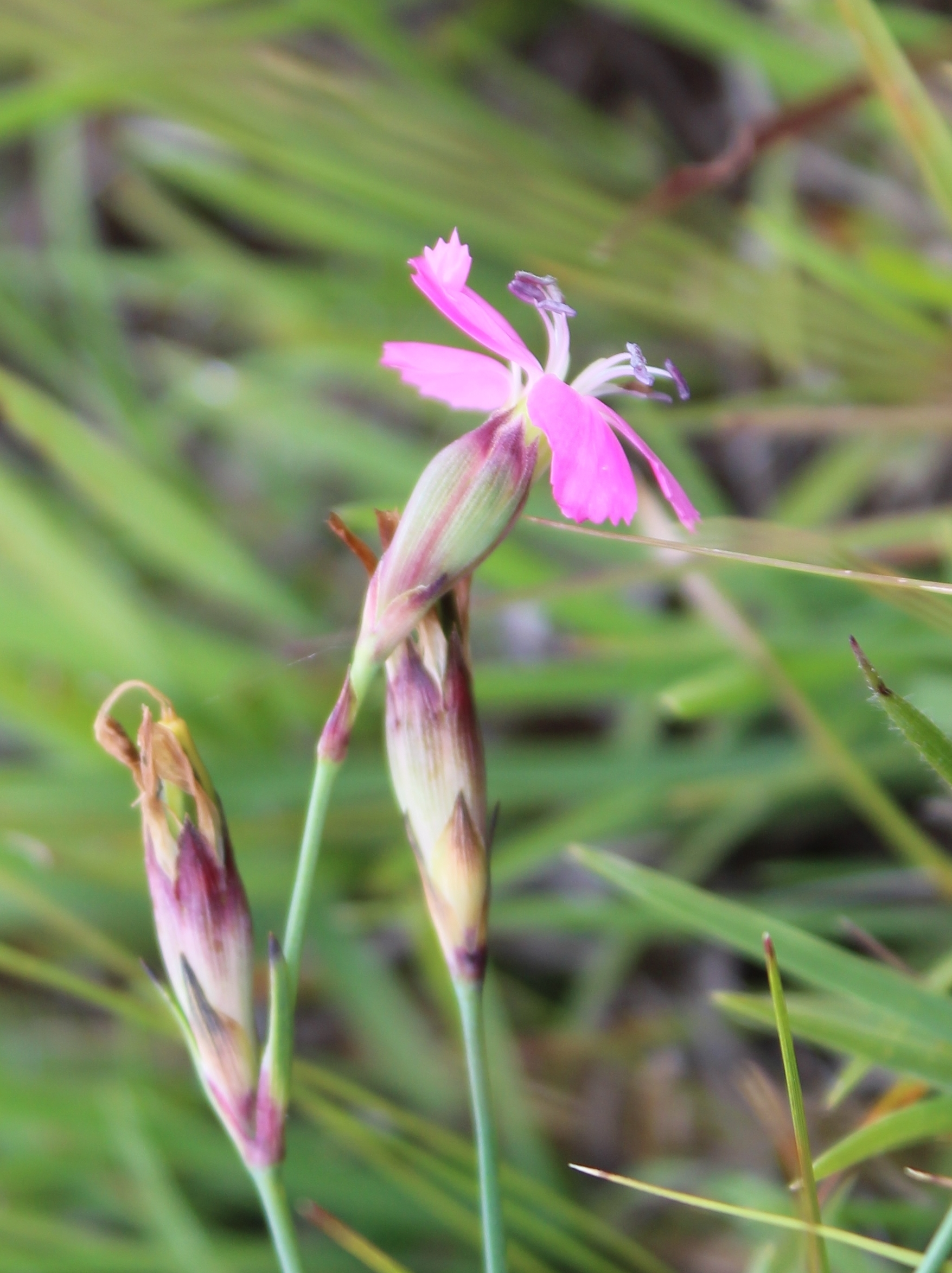
- Dianthus basuticus flowers

Scientific classification
- Kingdom: Plantae
- Clade: Tracheophytes
- Clade: Angiosperms
- Clade: Eudicots
- Order: Caryophyllales
- Family: Caryophyllaceae
- Genus: Dianthus
- Species: D. basuticus

Binomial name
- Dianthus basuticus Burtt Davy

= Dianthus basuticus =

Species of flowering plant

Dianthus basuticus, called the Drakensberg carnation, Lesotho carnation, Lesotho pink, hlokoa‑la‑tsela in the Sesotho language and Lesotho wilde angelier in Afrikaans, is a species of Dianthus native to South Africa and Lesotho.

== Distribution ==
It is a near-endemic of the Drakensberg Alpine Centre, and occurs predominantly on rocky, grassy slopes, from Avontuur and the Kammanassie mountains in the Western Cape, through the Eastern Cape and into KwaZulu-Natal Province.

The northernmost records are from near Belfast and Pilgrim's Rest in Mpumalanga Province. Other records are from Kokstad and Newcastle, KwaZulu-Natal, as well as Harrismith and Clocolan in the Free State Province.

The subspecies fourcadei occupies the westernmost extent of the species distribution range, occurring in the mountainous Uniondale, Langkloof and Kouga regions, around the boundary between the Western and Eastern Cape provinces.

== Description ==
Dianthus basuticus is a densely tufted perennial reaching 15–20 cm (5.9–7.9 in), with linear (50 mm x 5 mm) blue-grey leaves, densely clumped near to the ground.

The inflorescence is usually branched, and rises c. 15 cm above the main leaf tufts.

The flowers are usually dark pink, c. 20 mm wide, and appear in Summer–Autumn (November–April). The petals are broad and obovate (those of most other South African species are narrower and oblanceolate) with only minutely toothed or serrated tips. The petals are sometimes slightly recurved.

The calyx is 15–20 mm in length, with 2–3 bract-pairs. The bracts are 15–20 mm long.

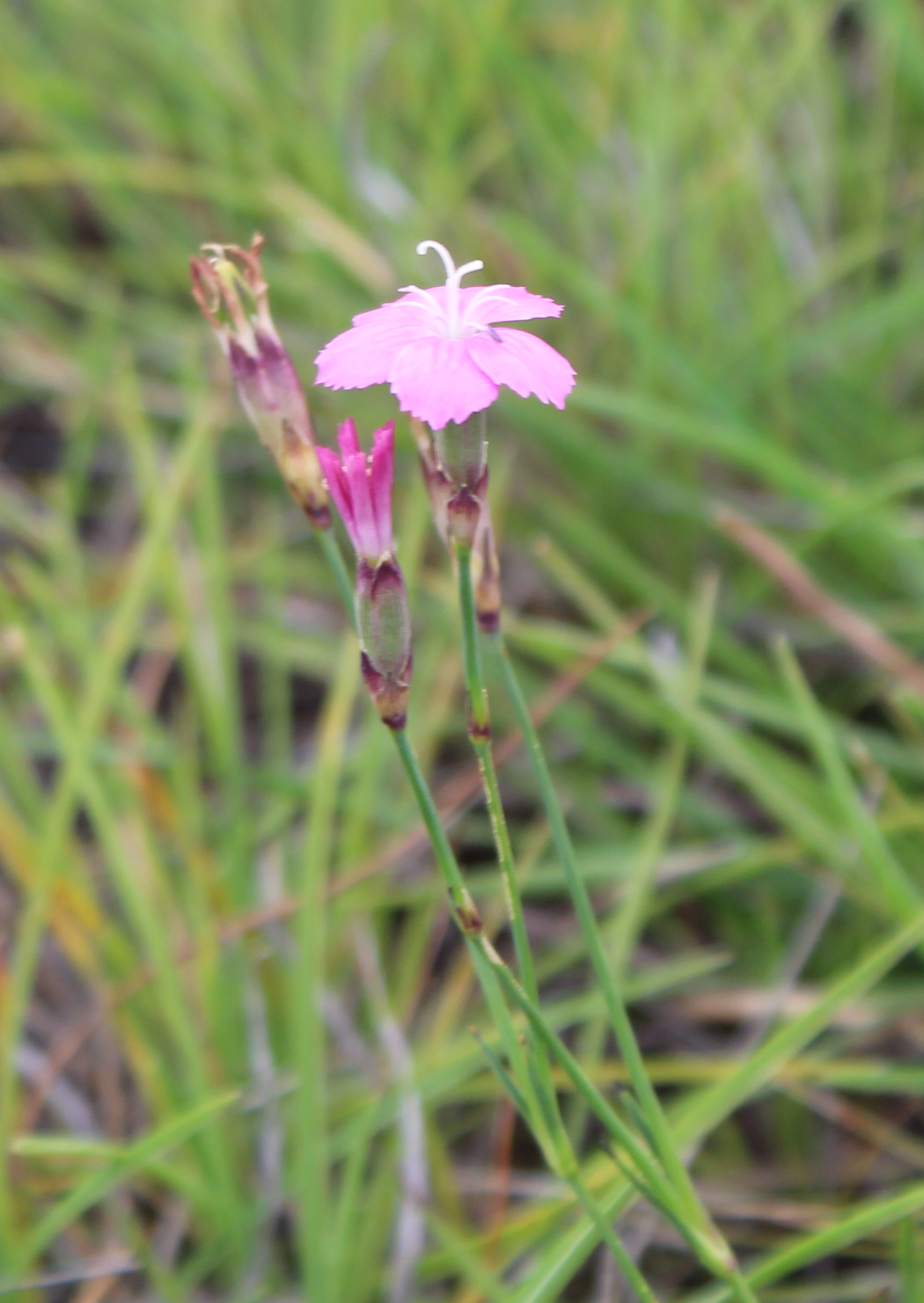
The Dianthus basuticus petals are only mildly or minutely serrated.

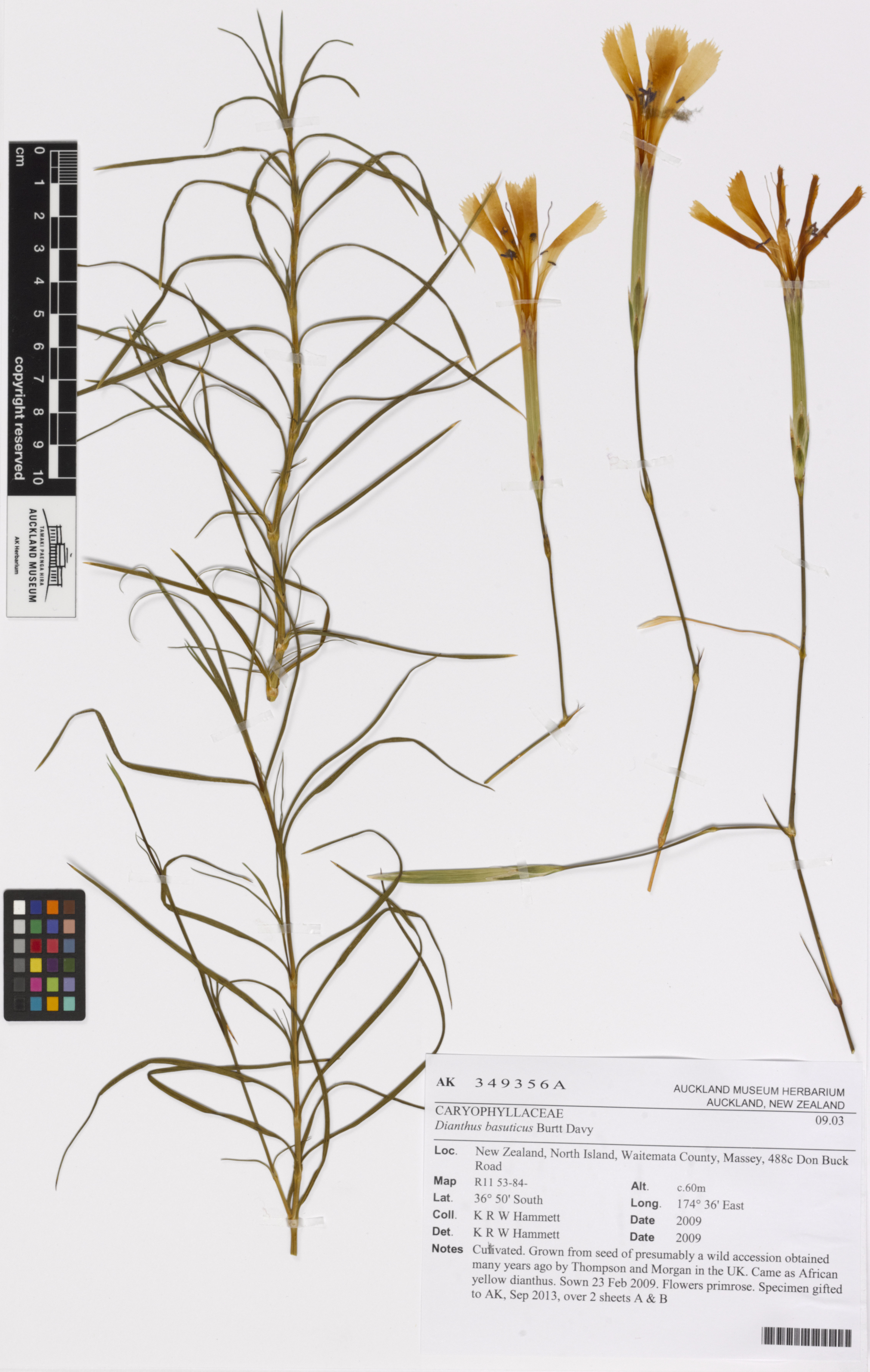
Dianthus basuticus herbarium specimen
