= Dianthus grossheimii =

Conservation status
- Endangered (IUCN 3.1)

Scientific classification
- Kingdom: Plantae
- Clade: Tracheophytes
- Clade: Angiosperms
- Clade: Eudicots
- Order: Caryophyllales
- Family: Caryophyllaceae
- Genus: Dianthus
- Species: D. grossheimii

Binomial name
- Dianthus grossheimii Schischk.

Species of plant

Dianthus grossheimii, often called Grossheim's pink or Gvozdika Grossgejma, is native to Turkey and Transcaucasus. It is often found in mountain steppes and meadows.

A perennial herb, D. grossheimii produces flowers with pink or purple petals that are dentate on the outer edges. These flowers are produced either singly or in a compact corymbiform inflorescence, with a calyx that's about 15-17mm long and a short pedicel. The calyx features 8 epicalyx scales. This plant may reach 20–30 cm across, and produces linear-lanceolate leaves (typically 3–3.5 cm long), a taproot, and pubescent stems.
