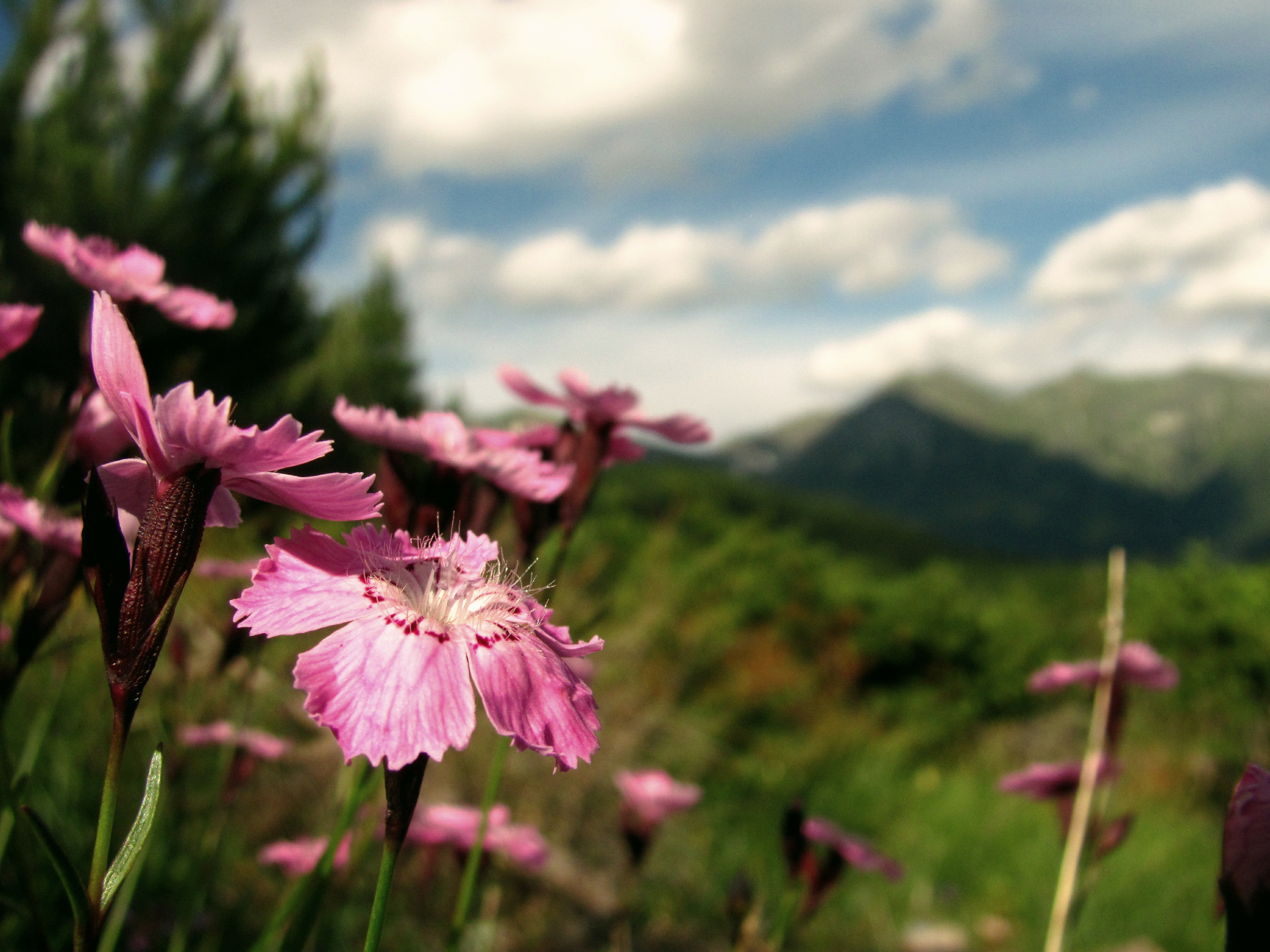
- Dianthus nitidus, Západné Tatry Mts, Slovakia

Conservation status
- Near Threatened (IUCN 3.1)

Scientific classification
- Kingdom: Plantae
- Clade: Embryophytes
- Clade: Tracheophytes
- Clade: Spermatophytes
- Clade: Angiosperms
- Clade: Eudicots
- Order: Caryophyllales
- Family: Caryophyllaceae
- Genus: Dianthus
- Species: D. nitidus

Binomial name
- Dianthus nitidus Waldst. & Kit.

= Dianthus nitidus =

Species of plant

Dianthus nitidus, commonly known as the Carpathian glossy pink, is a herbaceous perennial plant belonging to the family Caryophyllaceae.

It is found in Slovakia, Serbia and Montenegro and has most likely vanished from Poland. It had been recorded from the Pieniny in the 19th century but not seen since.
