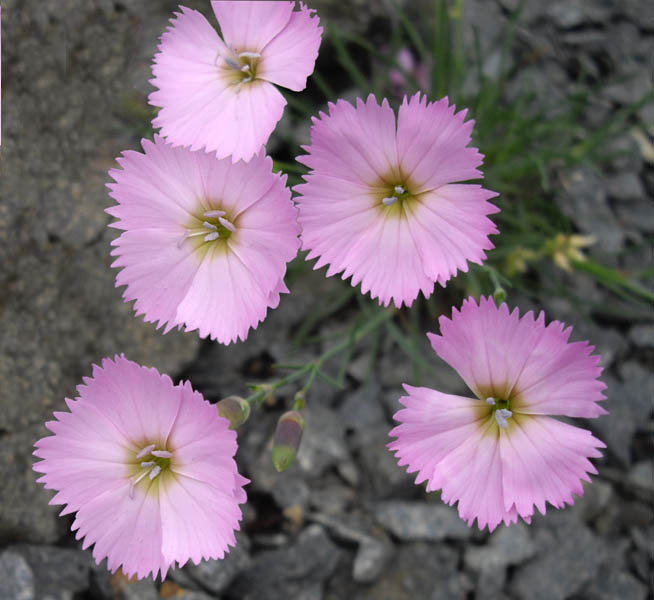

Scientific classification
- Kingdom: Plantae
- Clade: Embryophytes
- Clade: Tracheophytes
- Clade: Spermatophytes
- Clade: Angiosperms
- Clade: Eudicots
- Order: Caryophyllales
- Family: Caryophyllaceae
- Genus: Dianthus
- Species: D. sylvestris

Binomial name
- Dianthus sylvestris Wulfen

Synonyms
- List: Dianthus aggericola Jord.; Dianthus brevicalyx Beck; Dianthus caryophylloides Schult.; Dianthus consimilis Jord.; Dianthus frigidus Zucc.; Dianthus guyetanii Jord.; Dianthus inodorus (L.) Gaertn.; Dianthus orophilus Jord.; Dianthus reuteri Jord.; Dianthus rupestris L.f.; Dianthus saxicola Jord.; Dianthus scheuchzeri Rchb.; Dianthus sylvestris f. albiflorus Micevski; Dianthus sylvestris var. alpestris Micevski; Dianthus sylvestris var. humilior W.D.J.Koch; Dianthus sylvestris subsp. kozjakensis Micevski; Dianthus sylvestris var. subacaulis W.D.J.Koch; Dianthus wulfenii F.Dietr.

= Dianthus sylvestris =

Species of flowering plant

Dianthus sylvestris, also known as wood pink, is a species of Dianthus found in Europe, particularly in the Alps, and also said to be disjunctly found in the mountains of Greece. A perennial, it prefers to grow in drier, stony places, so it is occasionally planted in rock gardens.

== Subspecies ==
A number of subspecies have been described:

- Dianthus sylvestris subsp. alboroseus F.K.Mey.
- Dianthus sylvestris subsp. aristidis (Batt.) Greuter & Burdet
- Dianthus sylvestris subsp. boissieri (Willk.) Dobignard
- Dianthus sylvestris subsp. longibracteatus (Maire) Greuter & Burdet
- Dianthus sylvestris subsp. tergestinus (Rchb.) Hayek
