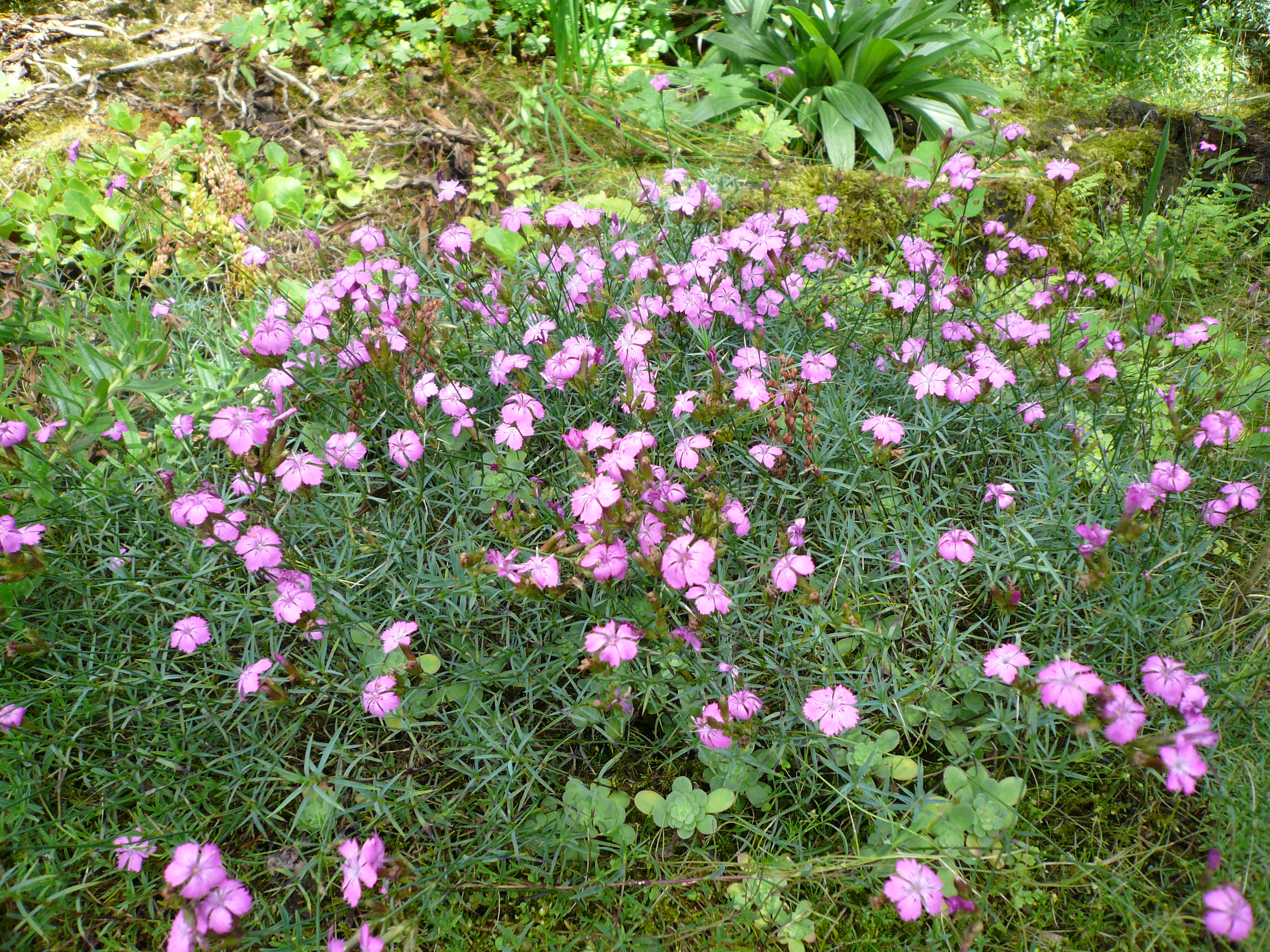

Scientific classification
- Kingdom: Plantae
- Clade: Tracheophytes
- Clade: Angiosperms
- Clade: Eudicots
- Order: Caryophyllales
- Family: Caryophyllaceae
- Genus: Dianthus
- Species: D. graniticus

Binomial name
- Dianthus graniticus Jordan

= Dianthus graniticus =

Species of plant

Dianthus graniticus is a species of pink in the carnation family. It's a herbaceous perennial plant belonging to the family Caryophyllaceae natively occurring in central France.

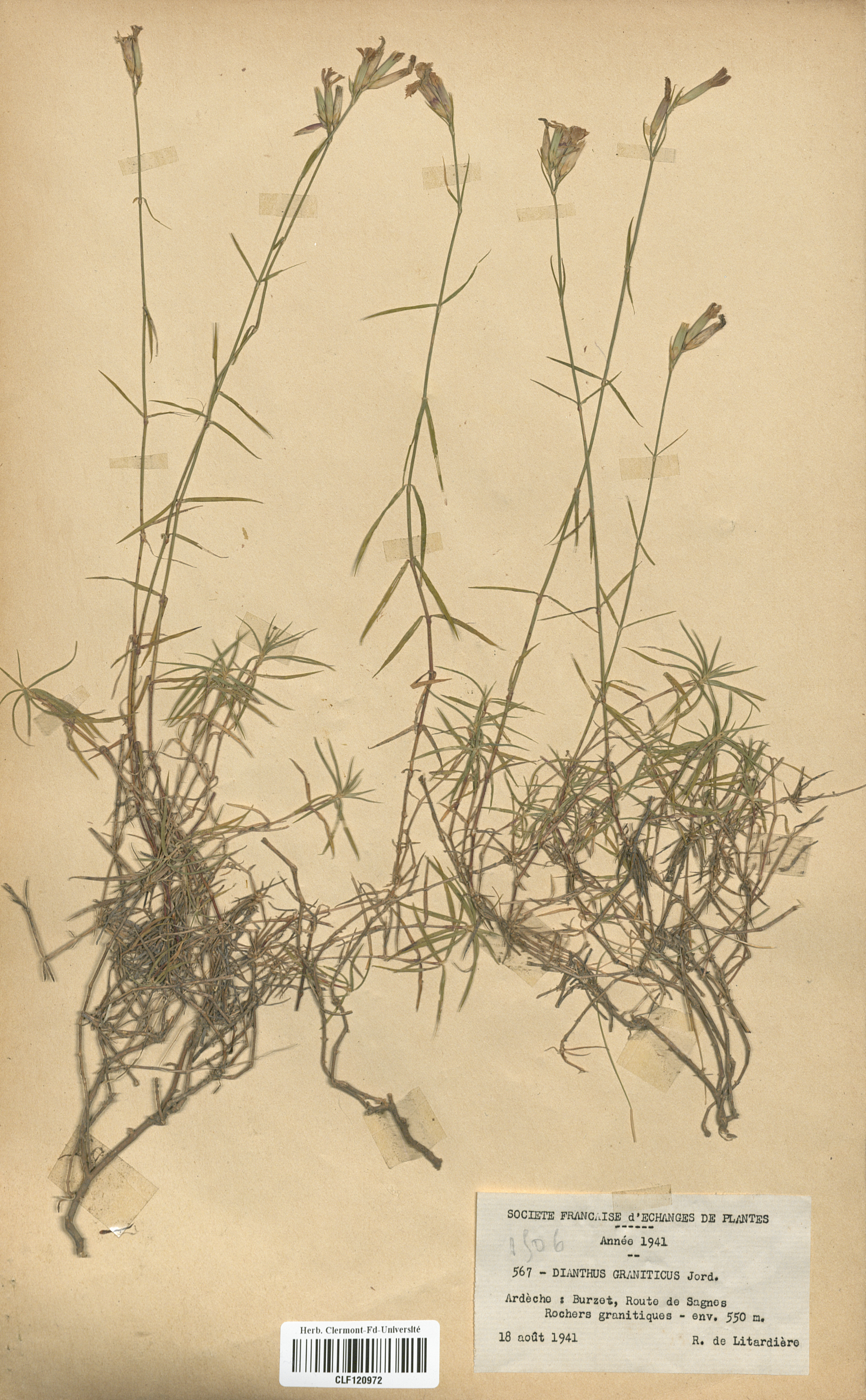
Specimen collected in Burzet in 1941 by René Verriet de Litardière.
