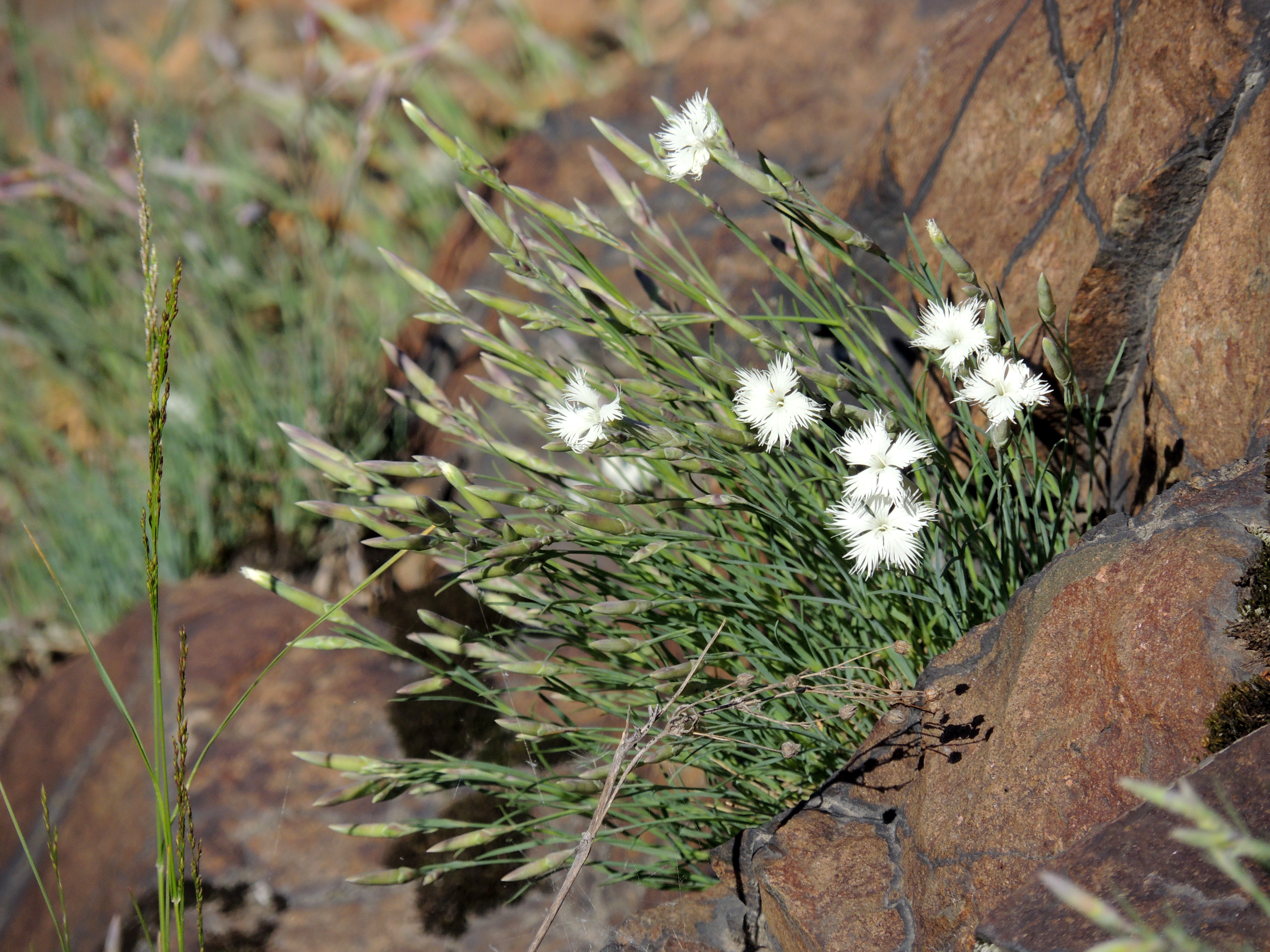

Scientific classification
- Kingdom: Plantae
- Clade: Tracheophytes
- Clade: Angiosperms
- Clade: Eudicots
- Order: Caryophyllales
- Family: Caryophyllaceae
- Genus: Dianthus
- Species: D. acicularis

Binomial name
- Dianthus acicularis Fisch. ex Ledeb.

Synonyms
- Dianthus tauscheri Eversm. ex Ledeb.

= Dianthus acicularis =

Species of flowering plant

Dianthus acicularis is a species of pink in the carnation family mostly found in the Urals region; eastern European Russia and western Siberia, with some occurrences in Kazakhstan, and Xinjiang in China. A diploid, its resistance to bacterial wilt of carnation and ease of cell line propagation in the laboratory make it useful for breeding ornamental carnations for the cut flower industry.
