= Dianthus cyri =

Scientific classification
- Kingdom: Plantae
- Clade: Tracheophytes
- Clade: Angiosperms
- Clade: Eudicots
- Order: Caryophyllales
- Family: Caryophyllaceae
- Genus: Dianthus
- Species: D. cyri

Binomial name
- Dianthus cyri Fisch. & C.A.Mey.

Synonyms
- Dianthus macrolepis Boiss.

Species of plant

Dianthus cyri is a species of flowering plant in the family Caryophyllaceae, native to the Middle East. It is an annual and a halophyte.
