= Dianthus freynii =

Freyn's carnition

Scientific classification
- Kingdom: Plantae
- Clade: Tracheophytes
- Clade: Angiosperms
- Clade: Eudicots
- Order: Caryophyllales
- Family: Caryophyllaceae
- Genus: Dianthus
- Species: D. freynii

Binomial name
- Dianthus freynii Vandas

Species of flowering plant

Dianthus freynii, or Freyn's carnation, in Bosnian Freynov karanfil or Freynov klinčić, is a plant that is endemic of Herzegovina karst, Bosnia and Herzegovina. It belongs to the family Caryophyllaceae (carnations).

== Description ==
This karst carnation is a dwarf, bruise-greenish, perennial, with a height of about 1–7 cm. Stems are regularly nonflowering, usually with two pairs of leaves, which are pins bruise with her stem. The leaves are in turfs, 1–2 cm long and broad barely 1 mm. They are fuzzy, rough, at the edges cartilaginous, at the top almost dull.

It blooms in July and August. Flowers browny-redish, calyx leaves triangular lancetal. Petals are purplish and relatively large, long up to about 14 mm; width is about 6 mm.

== Ecology and distribution ==
Freyn's carnation is growing in the alpine zone of the highest Hercegovinian mountains, at elevations of about 1900–2230 m.

Dianthus freynii prefers the shallow limestone soils, at organogenic and organomineral moldy soils and dolomite sirozes.

This carnation is endemic to the Dinaric mountains, with the center of area on high Herzegovinian mountains Prenj and Čvrsnica and its northeastern plateau Plasa (locus classicus), between the Doljanka river, Neretva, and Grabovica river. It belongs, therefore, to the Herzegovinian endemic center. It was described by Vandas (1889).
