= Dianthus bolusii =

Scientific classification
- Kingdom: Plantae
- Clade: Tracheophytes
- Clade: Angiosperms
- Clade: Eudicots
- Order: Caryophyllales
- Family: Caryophyllaceae
- Genus: Dianthus
- Species: D. bolusii

Binomial name
- Dianthus bolusii Burtt Davy

Species of flowering plant

Dianthus bolusii, called the mountain pink or bergangelier, is a species of flowering plant in the family Caryophyllaceae.

== Distribution ==
It is indigenous to the Northern Cape and Western Cape Province, South Africa, where it occurs on sandstone slopes, from the Cederberg in the north, eastwards to the Swartberg mountains, and southwards to the Du Toitskloof mountains and Swellendam area.

In the west is recorded from the Skurweberg, Michell's Pass near Ceres, Tulbagh and near Riebeek-Kasteel. In the south it is recorded from the Sonderend and Buffeljags rivers in the Swellendam area. In the far east there is a possible outlying record from the mountains north of George.

The variety luteus (distinguished by its yellow-green flowers) is recorded from the Groot Drakenstein mountain near Paarl.

== Description ==
Dianthus bolusii is a tufted perennial reaching 40 cm, with linear (max.200mm x 3mm) blue-grey leaves, densely clumped near to the ground.

The inflorescence is usually branched (1-8 flowers per stem), and rises c. 20 cm above the main leaf tufts. The flowers are cream to dark purple, and appear in Spring-Summer (Sept-Feb.).

The petals are oblanceolate, very deeply fringed, lacerate or fimbriate (and sometimes strongly downcurved/drooping). Occasionally, some specimens can bear darker red markings, near the bases of the petals.

The calyx is 23-27 mm in length, with 2-6 bract-pairs. The bracts have narrow papery margins and reach c. 1/3 up the length of the calyx.
