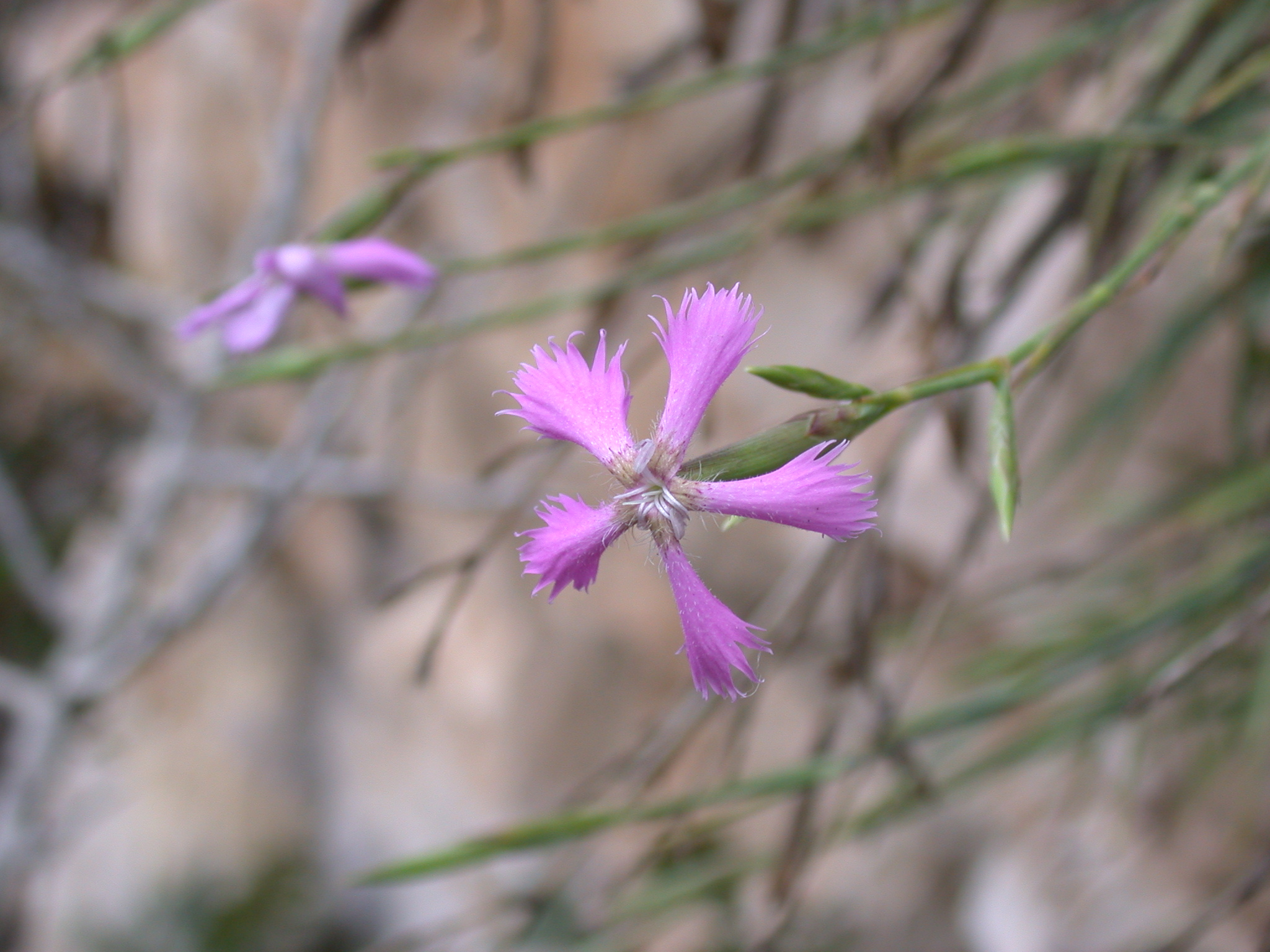
- D. pendulus in Mount Carmel, Israel

Scientific classification
- Kingdom: Plantae
- Clade: Tracheophytes
- Clade: Angiosperms
- Clade: Eudicots
- Order: Caryophyllales
- Family: Caryophyllaceae
- Genus: Dianthus
- Species: D. pendulus

Binomial name
- Dianthus pendulus Boiss. & Blanche

= Dianthus pendulus =

Species of plant in the carnation family

Dianthus pendulus is a herbaceous perennial plant belonging to the family Caryophyllaceae.

== Description ==
It is a subshrub with the buds close to the soil surface. The plant is perennial and has non-succulent smooth, entire, dull green leaves. Its pink flowers are hermaphrodite and bloom from June to November.

== Distribution and habitat ==
Dianthus pendulus is endemic to the eastern Mediterranean, it grows on rocky outcrops in Lebanon, Syria and northern Palestine and Iraq.
