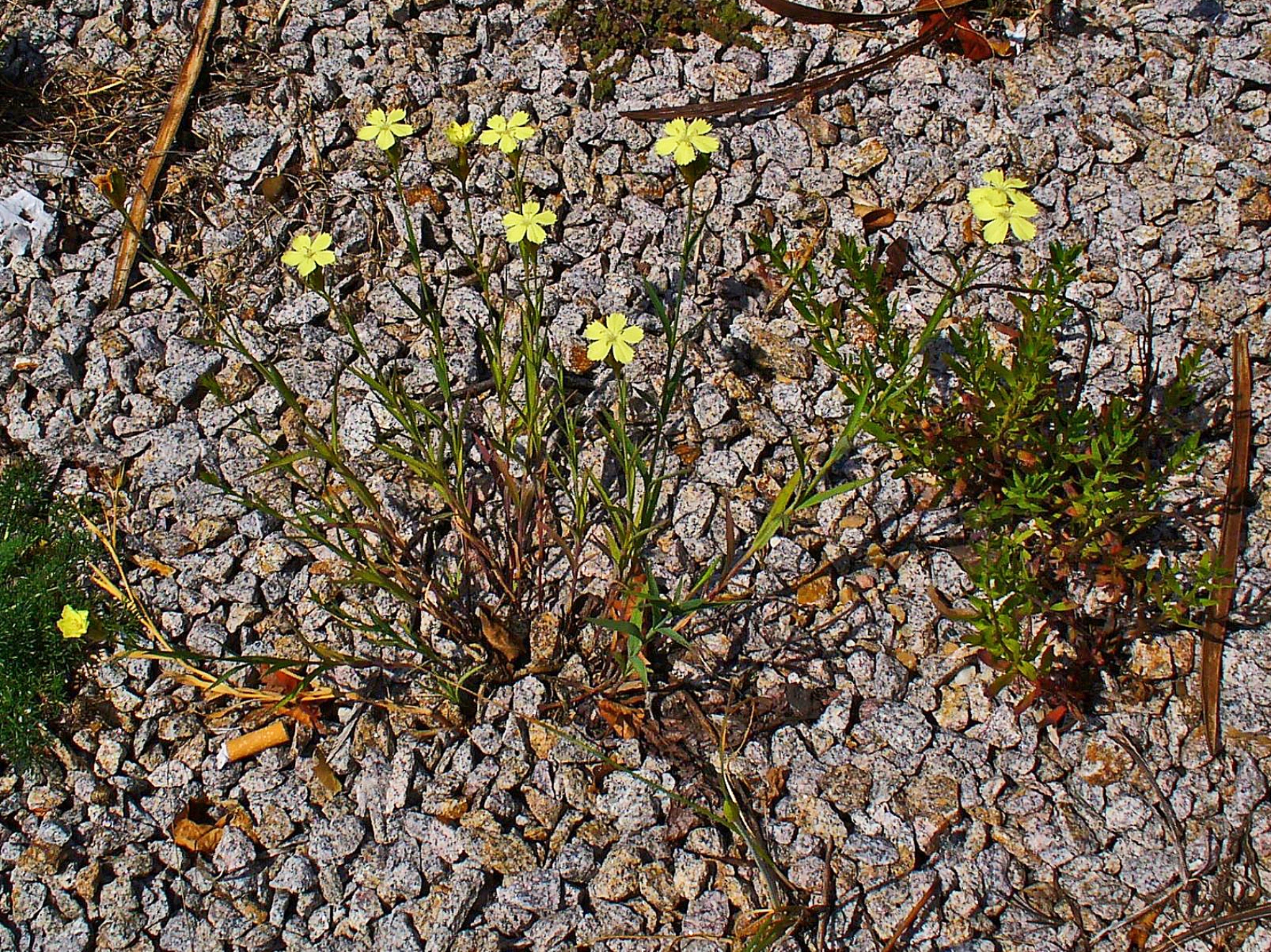

Scientific classification
- Kingdom: Plantae
- Clade: Tracheophytes
- Clade: Angiosperms
- Clade: Eudicots
- Order: Caryophyllales
- Family: Caryophyllaceae
- Genus: Dianthus
- Species: D. knappii

Binomial name
- Dianthus knappii (Pant.) Asch. & Kanitz ex Borbás

Synonyms
- Dianthus balbisii subsp. knappii (Pant.) Peruzzi & Uzunov; Dianthus liburnicus var. knappii Pant.

= Dianthus knappii =

Species of plant in the carnation family

Dianthus knappii, or Knapp's carnation, in Bosnian Knapov karanfil or Knapov klinčić, is a perennial herbaceous plant in the carnation family, Caryophyllaceae. It is endemic at Dinaric mountains, on the border area between Herzegovina (Bosnia and Herzegovina) and Montenegro. In chromosome set has 2n = 30.

== Description ==
The height of the flowering stalk is about 40 cm (16 in), erected and slightly hairy. The leaves are linear-lanceolate in whole edge, length is about 15 mm, and a width of about 2–4 mm. This carnation formed globulous peak cluster (dichasia). The cup is a herbaceous in narrowing the sense that it can be longer. The petals are long about 7 mm, sulphurous-yellow forward improperly serrated. The flowers have the 10 stamens. It blooms in May and June. The fruit is a wiry cylindrical sleeve, which opens with four prongs, but it is more dark seeds.

== Ecology and distribution ==
Knapp's carnation inhabits xerothermal areas on the edges of karst forest and groves, such as forest glades and clearings, with dry grassland vegetation on limestone bedrock. Its habitats typically have extreme sunny exposure, making it a typical heliophyte.

It is widespread in the Bosnia and Herzegovina (Herzegovina) and Montenegro.

Locus classicus is the Herzegovina: Necvijeće, near Trebinje.
