= Dianthus bicolor =

Conservation status
- Least Concern (IUCN 3.1)

Scientific classification
- Kingdom: Plantae
- Clade: Tracheophytes
- Clade: Angiosperms
- Clade: Eudicots
- Order: Caryophyllales
- Family: Caryophyllaceae
- Genus: Dianthus
- Species: D. bicolor

Binomial name
- Dianthus bicolor Adams

Synonyms
- Dianthus bicolor var. minor Ser.; Dianthus caucasicus Spreng.

Species of plant in the carnation family

Dianthus bicolor, the bicolour pink, is a species of flowering plant in the family Caryophyllaceae, native to Ukraine, south European Russia, the northern Caucasus, and Kazakhstan. It is found growing in a wide variety of habitats, including forests, grasslands, cliffs, and mountain peaks.
