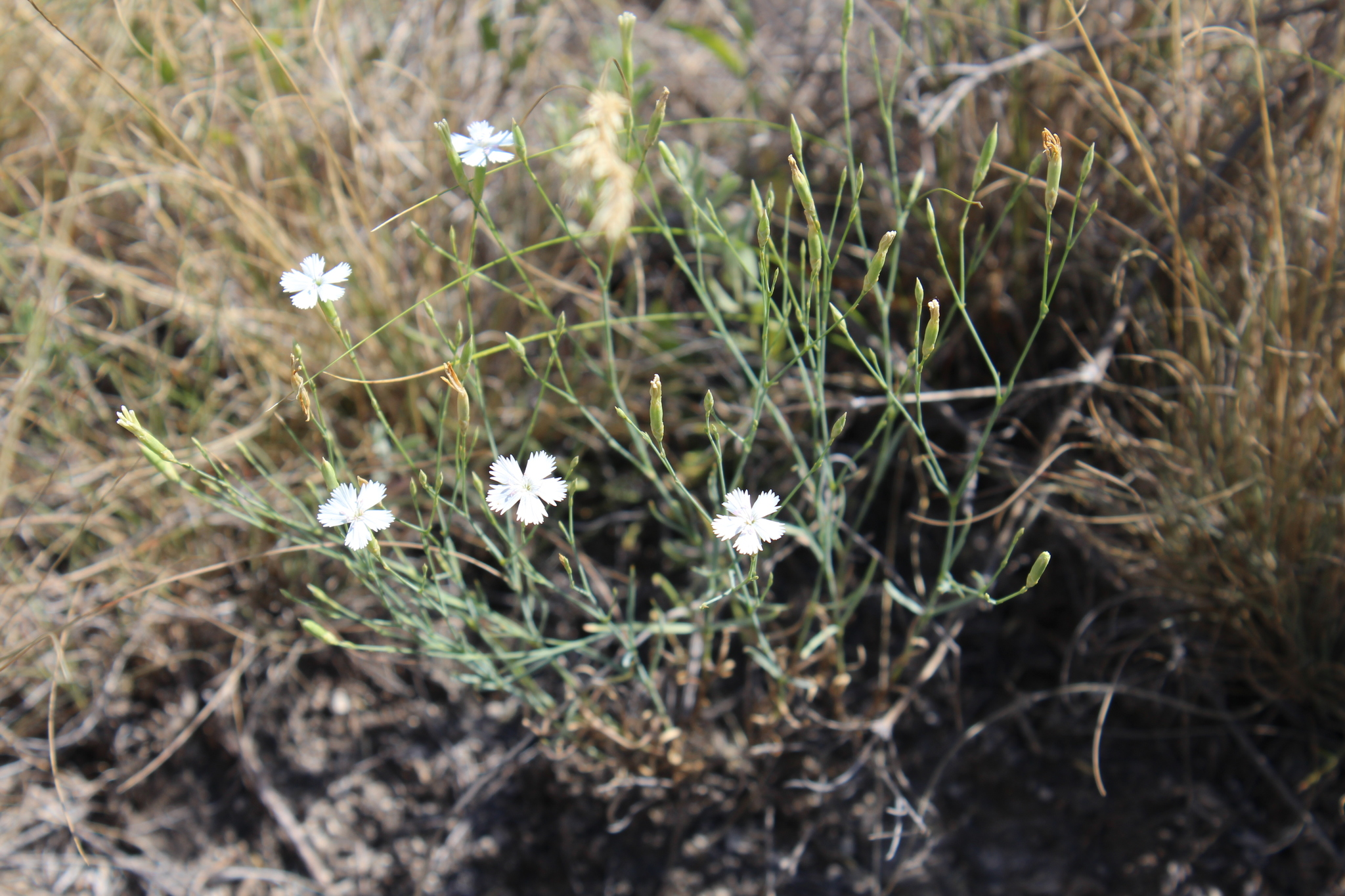

Scientific classification
- Kingdom: Plantae
- Clade: Tracheophytes
- Clade: Angiosperms
- Clade: Eudicots
- Order: Caryophyllales
- Family: Caryophyllaceae
- Genus: Dianthus
- Species: D. rigidus

Binomial name
- Dianthus rigidus M.Bieb.

Synonyms
- Tunica rigida (M.Bieb.) Raf.

= Dianthus rigidus =

Species of plant

Dianthus rigidus is a species of flowering plant in the family Caryophyllaceae, native to Crimea, east and south European Russia, Kazakhstan, and Western Siberia. It was first described by F. A. Marschall von Bieberstein in 1808.
