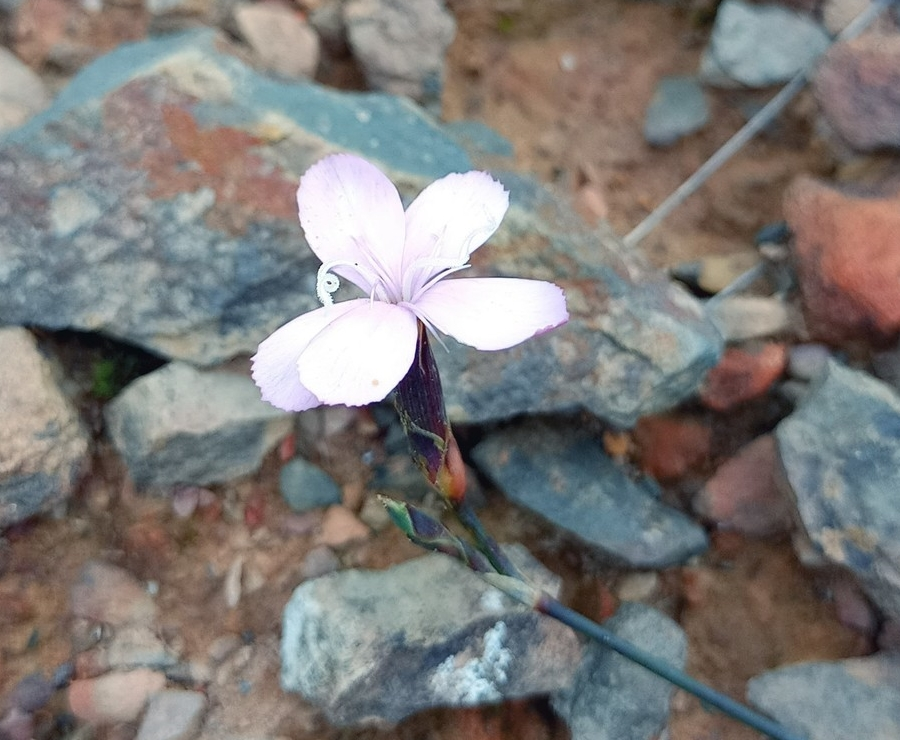

Scientific classification
- Kingdom: Plantae
- Clade: Tracheophytes
- Clade: Angiosperms
- Clade: Eudicots
- Order: Caryophyllales
- Family: Caryophyllaceae
- Genus: Dianthus
- Species: D. albens

Binomial name
- Dianthus albens Aiton

Synonyms
- Dianthus holopetalus Turcz.; Dianthus incurvus Thunb.

= Dianthus albens =

Species of flowering plant

Dianthus albens (Wild pink) is a species of flowering plant in the family Caryophyllaceae.

It is indigenous to the south western Cape of South Africa, where it occurs on sandy, rocky substrates, especially coastal, from the Cederberg in the Western Cape, southwards to the Cape Peninsula, and eastwards into the Eastern Cape province.

== Description ==
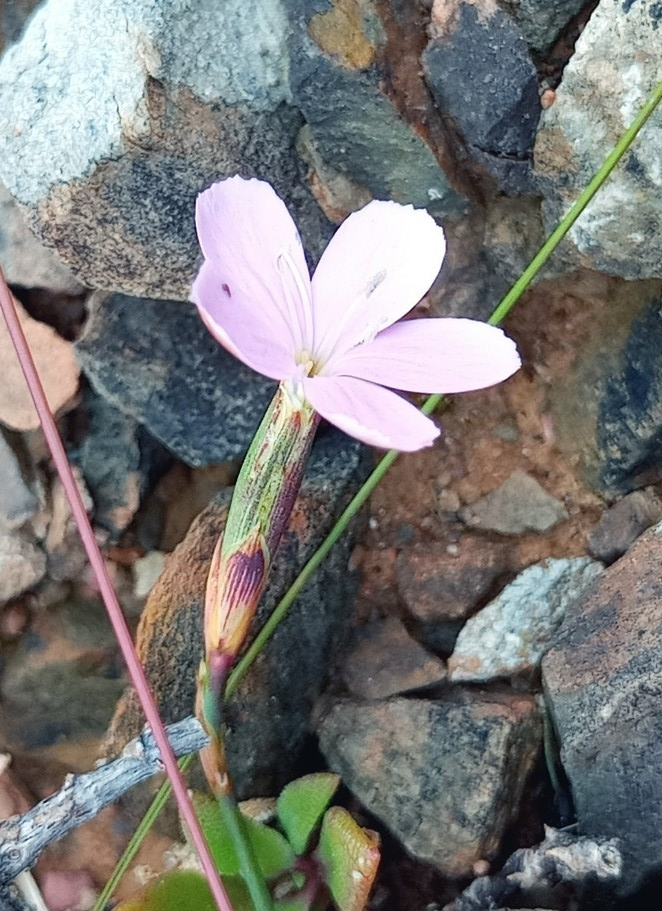
The petals of Dianthus albens are only mildly toothed (if at all)

Dianthus albens is a spreading or tufted herbaceous perennial, with semi-erect to upright stems reaching 35–40 cm, and with linear, opposite leaves.

The inflorescence is slender, leafless, and bears one-to-many white to purple flowers, in Spring, Summer and Autumn (Sept-Apr.). The petals have entire or crenate tips (rarely shallowly dentate/toothed).

The calyx is 12–18 mm in length, usually with 2 bract-pairs (sometimes with 1 or 3 bract pairs). The bracts have papery margins and reach max. 2/5 up the length of the calyx.

When ripe, the seed capsule extends out beyond the calyx, by about 5 mm.
