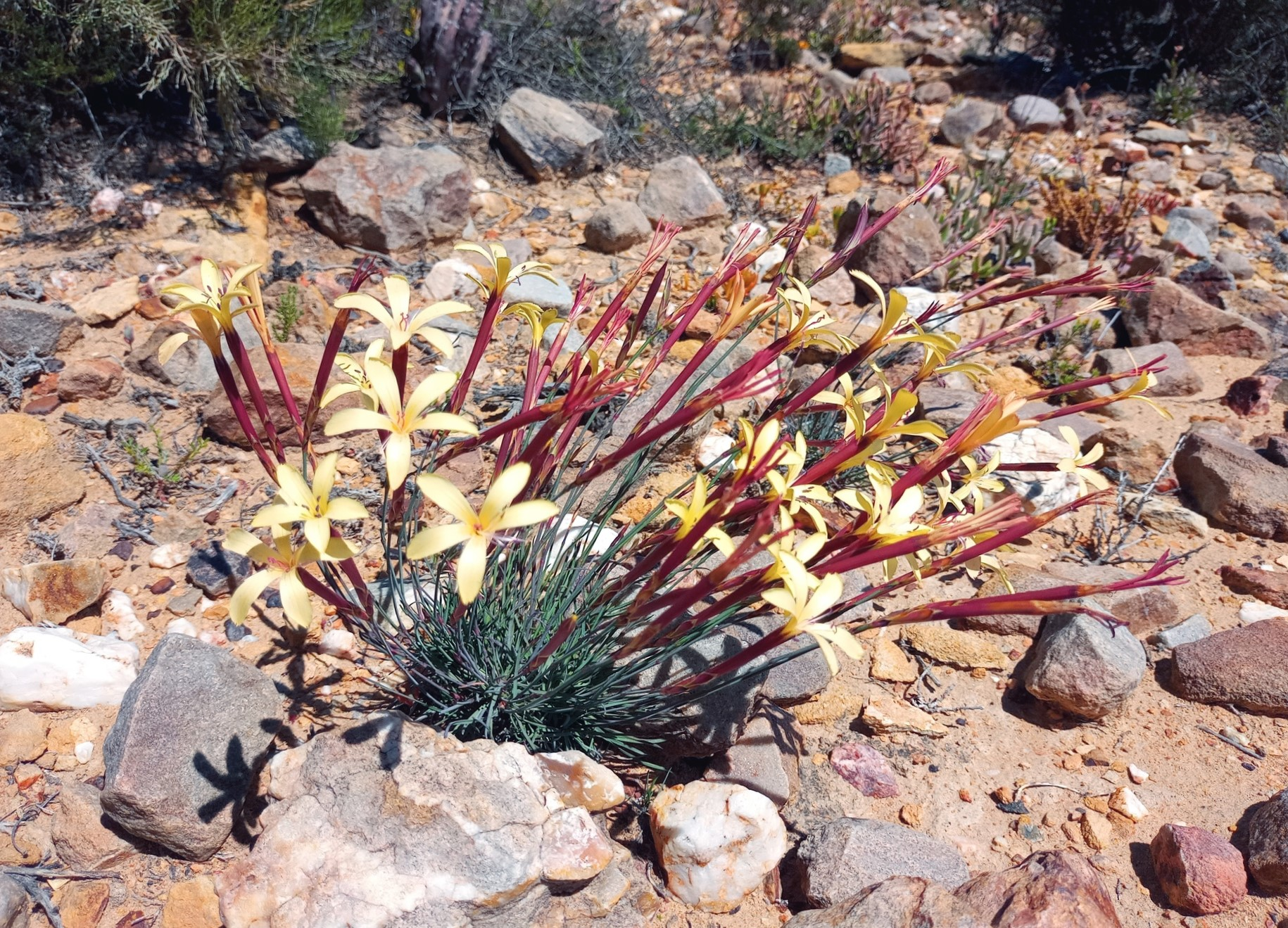

Scientific classification
- Kingdom: Plantae
- Clade: Tracheophytes
- Clade: Angiosperms
- Clade: Eudicots
- Order: Caryophyllales
- Family: Caryophyllaceae
- Genus: Dianthus
- Species: D. caespitosus

Binomial name
- Dianthus caespitosus Thunb.

= Dianthus caespitosus =

Species of flowering plant

Dianthus caespitosus, called the Karoo pink or koperangelier, is a species of flowering plant in the family Caryophyllaceae.

It is indigenous to the south-western Cape of South Africa, where it occurs on dry rocky slopes from Worcester in the west, northwards to Botterkloof near Clanwilliam, south to Genadendal and Riversdale, and eastwards to Uitenhage.

== Description ==
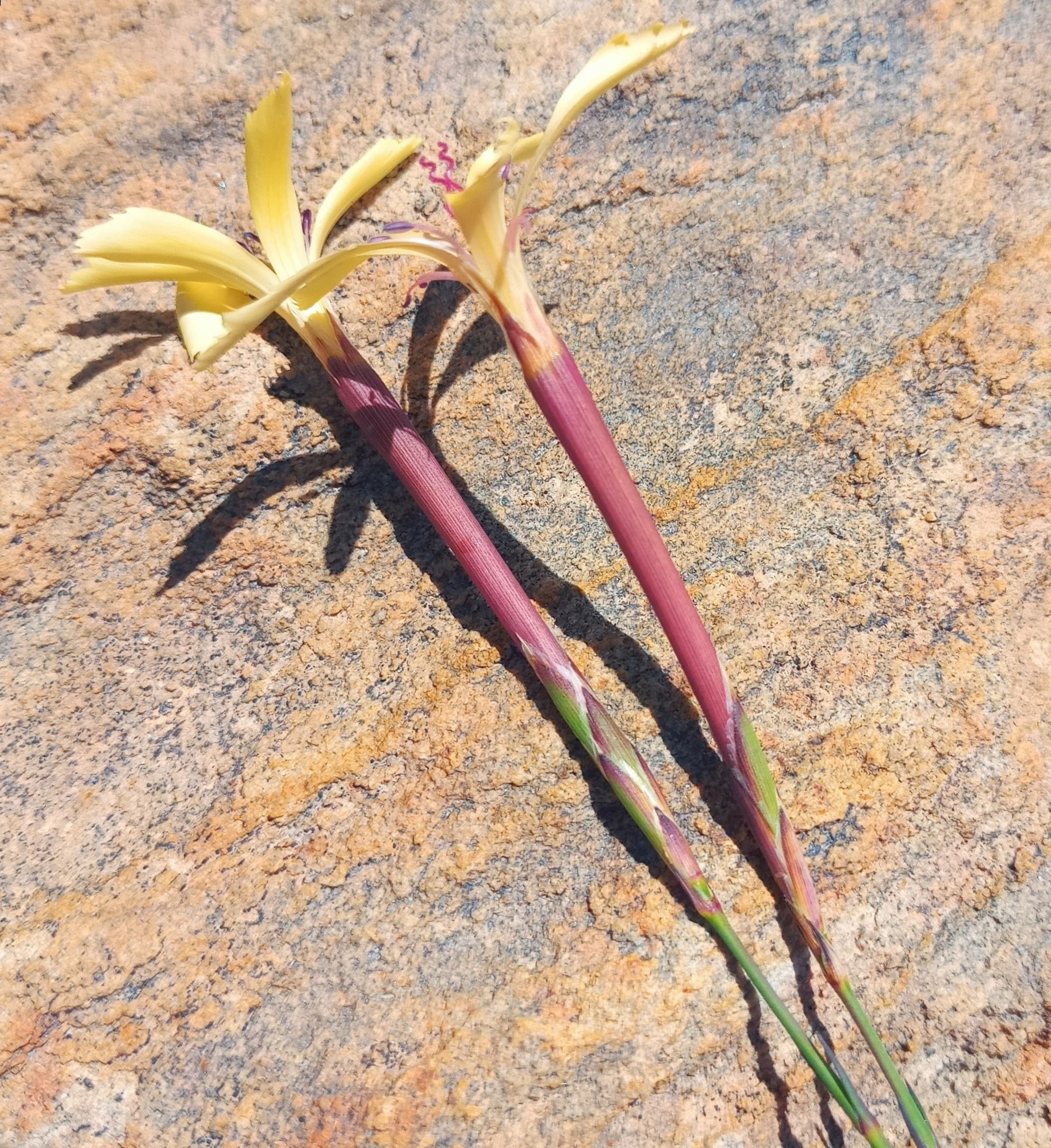
The distinctive elongated calyx of Dianthus caespitosus has 3-4 pairs of bracts at its base.

Dianthus caespitosus is a spreading or tufted herbaceous perennial reaching 40 cm high, with linear (60mm x 5mm) blue-grey leaves along the stems (leaves usually deciduous or absent below crowns).

The inflorescence is simple (sometimes sparsely branched). It rises c. 20 cm above the main leaf tufts, with smaller (5-15mm) leaf-pairs dispersed along it.

The flowers are pale-yellow to cream coloured, c. 25 mm wide, and appear in Spring-Summer (Sept-Jan.). The petals (c. 15x20mm) are always somewhat toothed or fringed (finely dentate to crenulate).

The calyx is elongated, 40-70 mm in length, with 3-4 bract-pairs. The calyx bracts are elongated acuminate, with sharp points, and only sometimes with faint, narrow papery margins.

=== Subspecies ===
In addition to the typical subspecies, D. caespitosus subsp. pectinatus is sometimes recognised for plants in the central Overberg and Swellendam areas. They are recorded from Cogmans kloof in the north, to Genadendal, Greyton and Riviersonderend in the west, to the Garcia pass and the Gouritz river valley in the east.

This subspecies has petals that are purple-to-white, with longer teeth (dentate or shortly fimbriate). It has a slightly shorter calyx (c. 35 mm).
