= Carpathian Large Carnivore Project =

The Carpathian Large Carnivore Project (CLCP) was a project to develop and implement an extensive protection program for large carnivores (bear, lynx and wolf) in Romania.

== Impact ==
During its term and beyond its lifetime the project caused the development of various national institutions directly or indirectly:

1. In 1999, the Piatra Craiului National Park was established with assistance of the CLCP.
2. In 1999, the Romanian ecotourism agency Carpathian Nature Tours (cntours) was founded. Until the end of the project in the year 2003 the ecotourism-program was arranged together with the CLCP. Afterwards it was continued by cntours under acquisition of various further project targets.
3. In 2000, the first association for ecotourism in Romania "Plaiuri Zarneştene" was founded.
4. In 2005, a bear sanctuary was built near Zărneşti. Currently there are about 50 bears living, which came from illegal private husbandries or had been abused as dancing bears.
