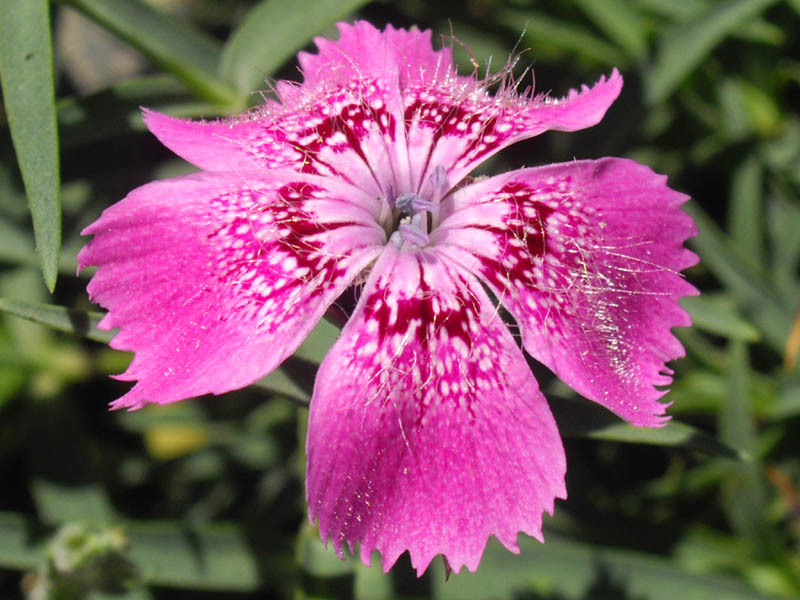
- Close-up of flower

Scientific classification
- Kingdom: Plantae
- Clade: Tracheophytes
- Clade: Angiosperms
- Clade: Eudicots
- Order: Caryophyllales
- Family: Caryophyllaceae
- Genus: Dianthus
- Species: D. callizonus

Binomial name
- Dianthus callizonus Schott & Kotschy

= Dianthus callizonus =

Species of plant in the carnation family

Dianthus callizonus, the beauty's girdle, is a species of flowering plant in the family Caryophyllaceae, endemic to the Piatra Craiului Mountains of Romania. Garofița Pietrei Craiului, the little carnation of Piatra Craiului, as it is known in Romanian, is a symbol of the Piatra Craiului massif and the national park of the same name.

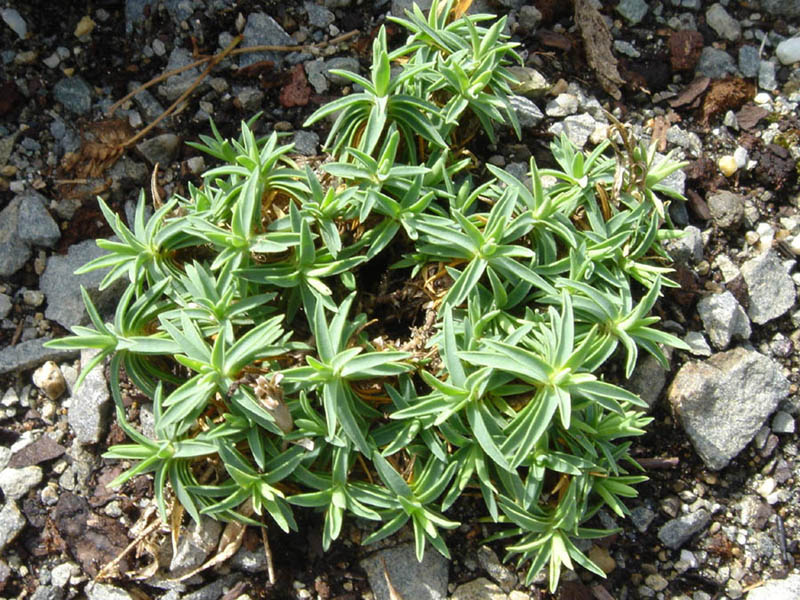
Foliage, on scree

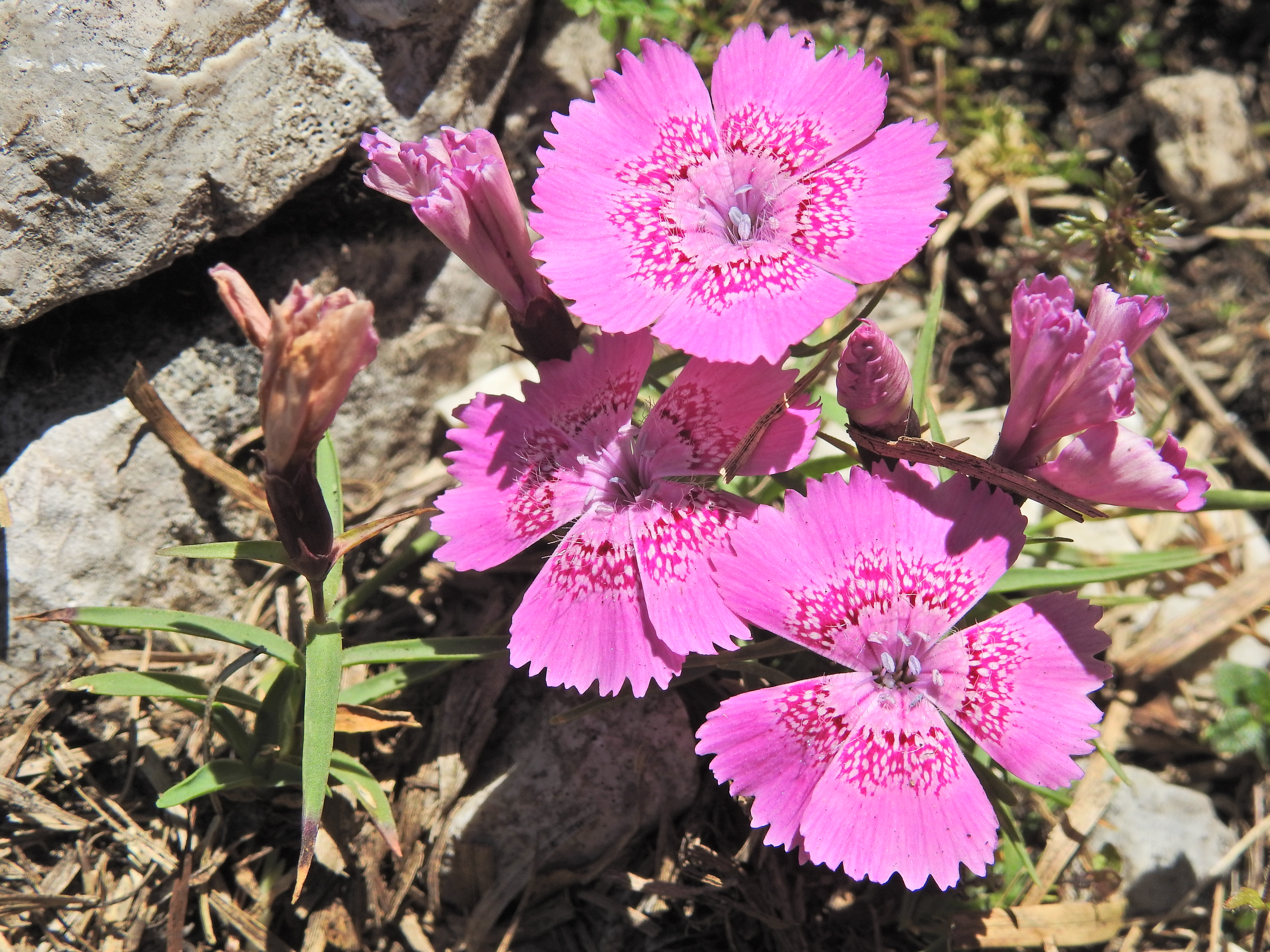
It prefers alkaline substrates

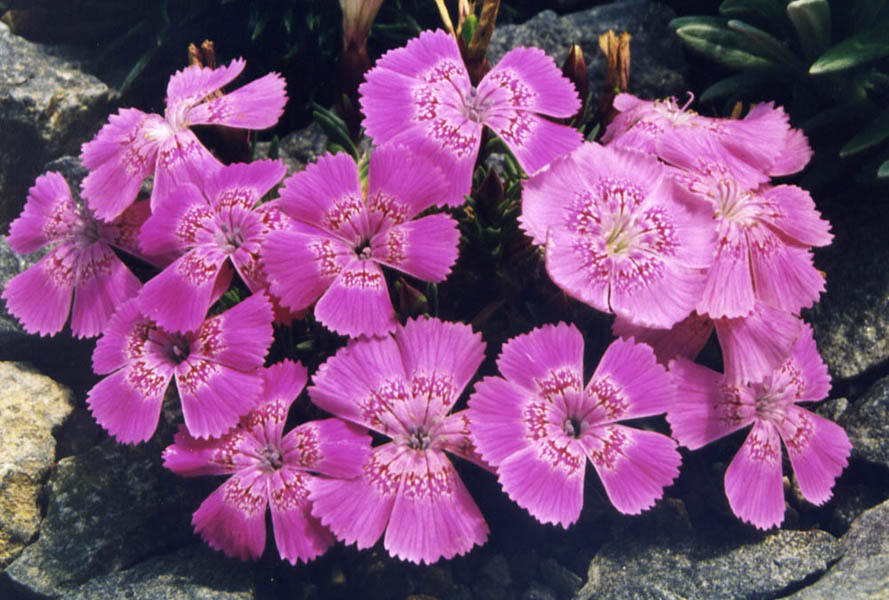
A grouping
