= Valea Muierii River =

Valea Muierii River may refer to

- Valea Muierii, a tributary of the Dâmbovicioara in Argeș County, Romania
- Valea Muierii, a tributary of the Săliște in Sibiu County, Romania
