= Valea Popii River =

Valea Popii River may refer to:

- Valea Popii, a tributary of the Cosău in Maramureș County, Romania
- Valea Popii, a tributary of the Dâmbovicioara in Argeș County, Romania
- Valea Popii, a tributary of the Ghimbav in Argeș County, Romania
- Valea Popii, a tributary of the Prahova in Brașov County, Romania
- Valea Popii, a tributary of the Siriul Mare in Buzău County, Romania
- Valea Popii, a tributary of the Teleajen in Prahova County, Romania
