= Alexandru Ilie =

Romanian footballer

Personal information
- Full name: Mihai Alexandru Ilie
- Date of birth: 19 January 2000 (age 26)
- Place of birth: Zărnești, Romania
- Height: 1.65 m (5 ft 5 in)
- Position: Midfielder

Team information
- Current team: Voluntari
- Number: 21

Youth career
- 2012–2013: CSȘ Brașovia
- 2013–2016: Ardealul Cluj
- 2016–2018: Juventus București
- 2019–2020: Voluntari

Senior career*
Years	Team	Apps	(Gls)
2018–2019	Daco-Getica București	11	(1)
2019–	Voluntari	23	(0)
- * Club domestic league appearances and goals as of 23 May 2022

Alexandru Mihai Ilie (born 19 January 2000) is a Romanian professional footballer who plays as a midfielder for FC Voluntari.
