= Ioan Bran de Lemény =

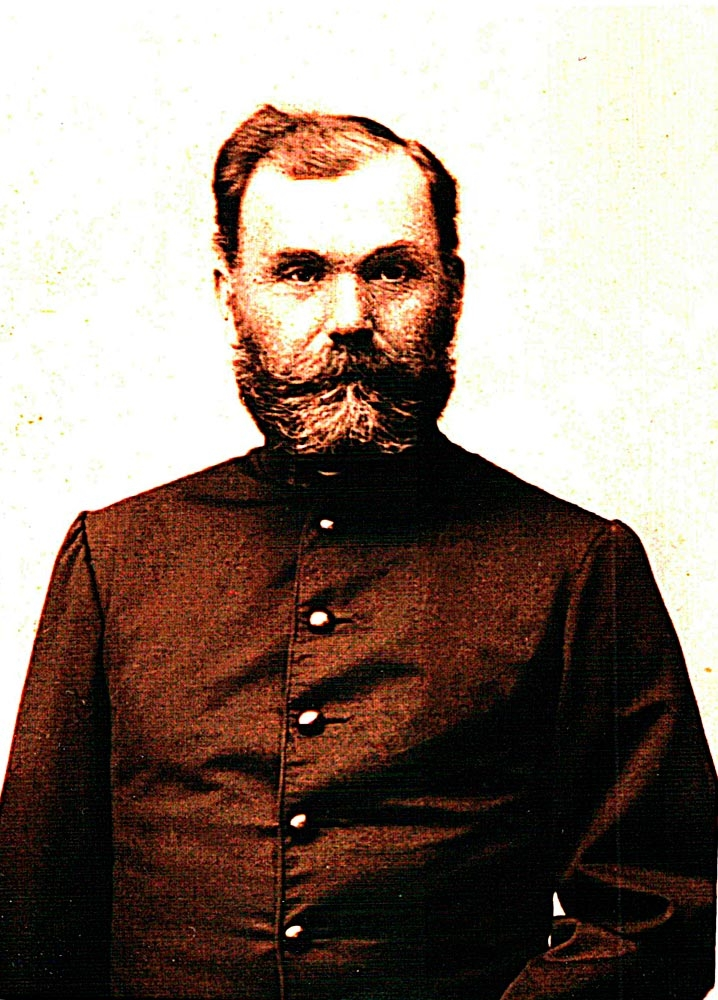
- Born: 1811; Zărnești, Transylvania, Austrian Empire (now Romania)
- Died: 1899 (aged 87–88); Brașov, Austria-Hungary
- Occupation(s): Lawyer, Prefect

Ioan Bran de Lemény et Kozla (Hungarian: leményi és kozlai Bran János; 1811–1899), also known as Ioan Bran, was a lawyer, a revolutionary, and Transylvania's first Romanian civil servant. He was one of the organizers of the Romanian Legions and the captain of Fogaras County during the "liberal regime" (1861–1865).

== Early life and education ==
Ioan Bran was born in Imperial Austrian-ruled Transylvania, in a small town, named Zărnești. He was the son of Ioan Bran and Bucura Bran (born as Bucura Aldulea). He was the youngest child and the only boy in a family of four children. He was named like his father, a notary, and grandfather, a priest in Zărnești. By decree no. 25.766 on November 19, 1859, Ioan Bran received authorization to wear the "Lemény" and "Kozla" predicates, elevating to the Hungarian nobility. When Ioan was four years old his father died at the age of 41.

He started his studies in his home village and continued with secondary studies in Blaj and Sibiu. In 1830, his mother wanted to send him to study in Cluj and take the Philosophical courses at the Roman Catholic High School, however she could not get social help that would allow Ioan to receive free food and accommodation. Since Ioan Bran was a young boy and willing to study, he asked for help from his numerous relatives, some of whom were quite wealthy. This allowed him to start studying at law school in Cluj-Napoca. He later did his lawyer practice at the Court of Appeal of Târgu Mureș.

After obtaining the censorship of the attorney (attestation) in 1837, he established his practice in Brașov as "the first Romanian advocate".

== Revolutionary activity ==
On April 13, 1848, a delegation led by Ioan Bran went to the Magistrate session in Brașov, where he held a long speech in Romanian, asking for new elections and for half of the positions in the council to be occupied by Romanians. He was also a part of a delegation of 32 Romanian leaders in the Burzenland, who participated in the Blaj Assembly (May 15–17, 1848), where the national, political, religious and social claims were exposed. The delegation called for the same rights for Romanians as any nation inhabiting Transylvania, the independence of the Romanian nation, and the protest against the unification of Transylvania with Hungary. Then, in July 1848, Ioan Bran became the epitaph of the St. Nicholas Church in Brașov and began to get involved in revolutionary movements, becoming known as an important local leader.

Due to his intellectual abilities and patriotism he was elected to the national assembly as secretary with nine other Romanians. On October 20, 1848, he signed, along with August Treboniu Laurian, Simion Bărnuțiu, Timotei Cipariu, Nicolae Bălăşescu and Florian Micăş, the manifest to the Romanians. He was also elected to be a member of the Romanian delegation to go to Vienna to present to the Emperor of Austria the wishes of the Romanians in Transylvania. He then continued to militate for the national rights of the Romanians in Transylvania after 1849.

In 1860, he became the supreme captain of Fogaras County, having a decisive role in introducing the Romanian language into administration as an official language.

Ioan Bran was also a member of an interest group, whose purpose was to act as mediator between the ordinary people and their relationships with the main institutions, whether those were ecclesiastical, political (the Romanian National Party), financial (the Albina bank), or cultural (the "ASTRA" cultural association).

== Personal life and career ==
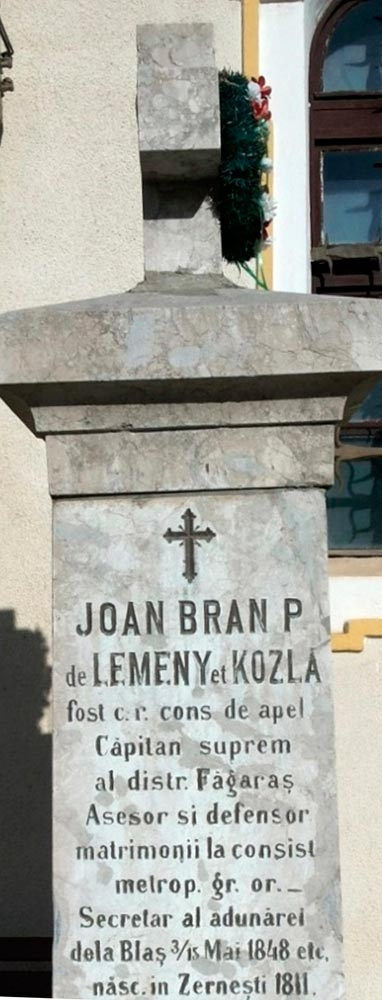
Ioan Bran's grave in the cemetery of the Brașovechi Church.

On September 4, 1838 at 27 years old, Ioan married Maria Oprea Circa, the daughter of a merchant whom he had known during his numerous trials at the Cluj Court of Appeal where he disputed problems with the Transylvanian Saxons. Maria was 16 years old and was educated in a monastery in Sibiu. The couple went on to have 10 children, 7 boys and 3 girls.

His wife had a civic spirit and she founded a Women's Association in December 1850 to raise money to support the Transylvanian Association for Literature and Culture of the Romanian People - ASTRA, founded by Andrei Șaguna.

Shortly after his appointment as perfect, he was named a member of the Romanian National Committee, in the Defense Commission to organize military Transylvanian Romanians. The person who helped him lead his district was the vice prefect, Constantin Săcărean.

Between 1851-1864, Ioan Bran worked as a judge of justice in the civil and military government of Transylvania. After holding this position, he was appointed counselor at the Court of Appeal in Sibiu, during which in November 1859, he received the right to the titles of nobles, "de Lemény" and "et Kozla" from the Magistrate of Brasov.

In 1857, he also became a counselor at the Court of Cassation and Justice of Sibiu together with Vasile Ladislau Pop, the only Romanians.

In 1866, the Cluj authorities dismissed Ioan from the post of prefect of Fogaras County for refusing to reintroduce Hungarian into administration. He was also retired early so that he could not act in favor of the Romanians when implementing the Austro-Hungarian dualism of 1867. He then moved back to Brașov, however, he never stopped watching on every national and cultural moves, contributing whenever his support was invoked, being at the same time an assistant and a matrimonial defender of the Metropolitan Consistory in Sibiu. He died in Brașov in 1899, at 88 years old. He was buried in the family tomb, along with his wife Maria, who had passed 19 years earlier in 1880.
