= Brașovechi Church =

Heritage site in Brașov County, Romania

Coordinates: 45°39′16″N 25°35′21″E

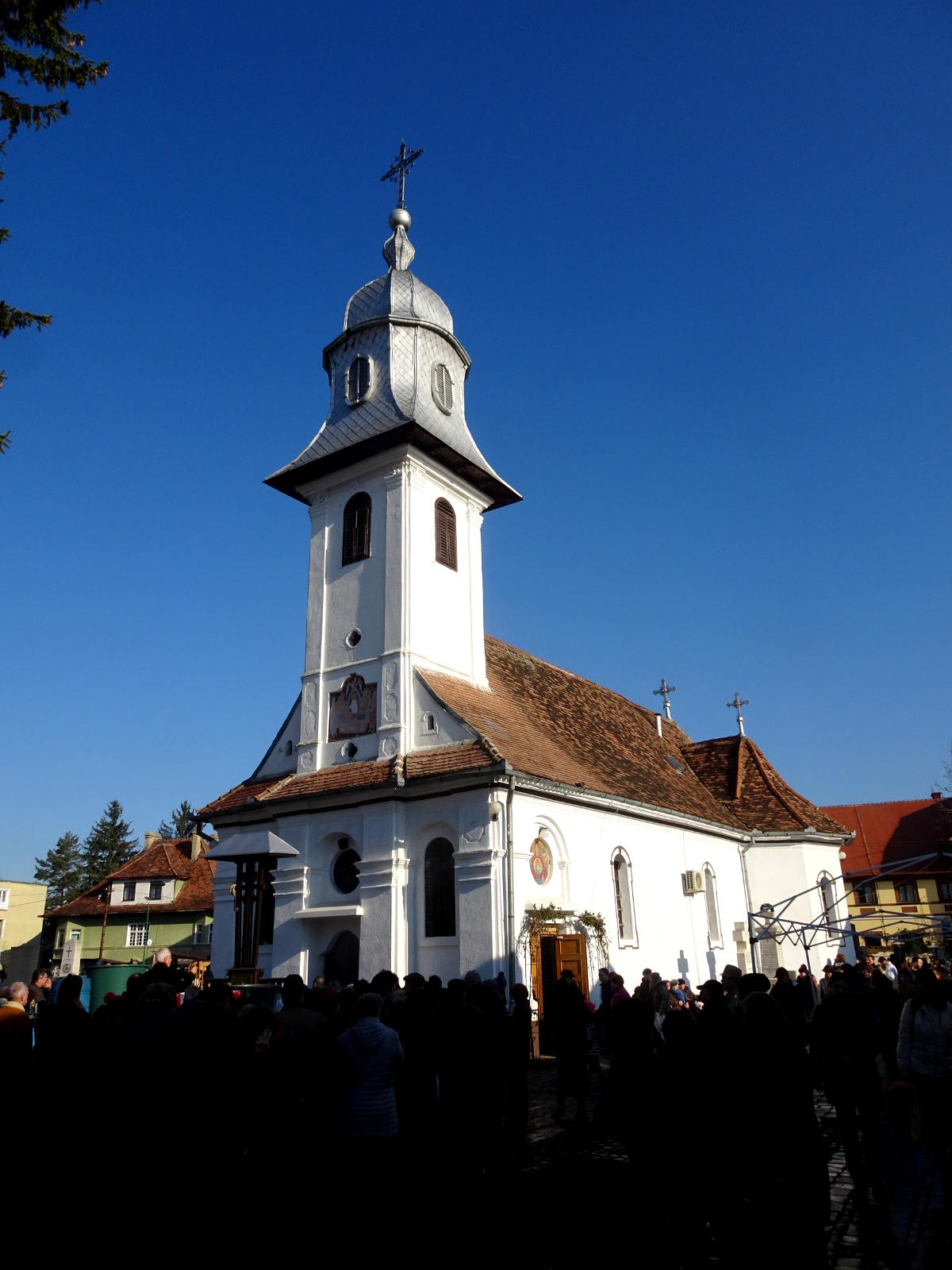
Brașovechi Church

The Brașovechi Church, also known as "The Dormition of the Mother of God" Church (Brașovechi)" is a Romanian Orthodox church located at 47 Bisericii Române Street, Brașov, Romania. Located in the Brașovechi district, it is dedicated to the Dormition of the Theotokos.

After the Patent of Toleration was issued in 1782, the Romanians of Brașov sent a number of petitions to the local and Viennese authorities, asking to build a church. Ștefan Nicola, a wealthy merchant of Șcheii Brașovului and a Greek originally from Ioannina, promised a magistrate that he would pay the entire cost. As a result, a decree of October 1782 approved a “chapel” and adjacent cemetery near a barracks. The church was built in 1783, and its street was named after the church the same year. The parish served the Romanian population living below the city walls.

Made of brick and stone, the church is built in a late Baroque style, in a three-lobed shape. There is an altar apse and two side apses; these are polygonal on the exterior and semicircular on the interior. The square western tower sits atop the vestibule, holding the bells. It was initially covered in tiles, replaced by brass plates in 1928. The tile roof is saddle-shaped. Dedicated in 1785 by Bishop Gideon Nikitić, the church maintains its original aspect.

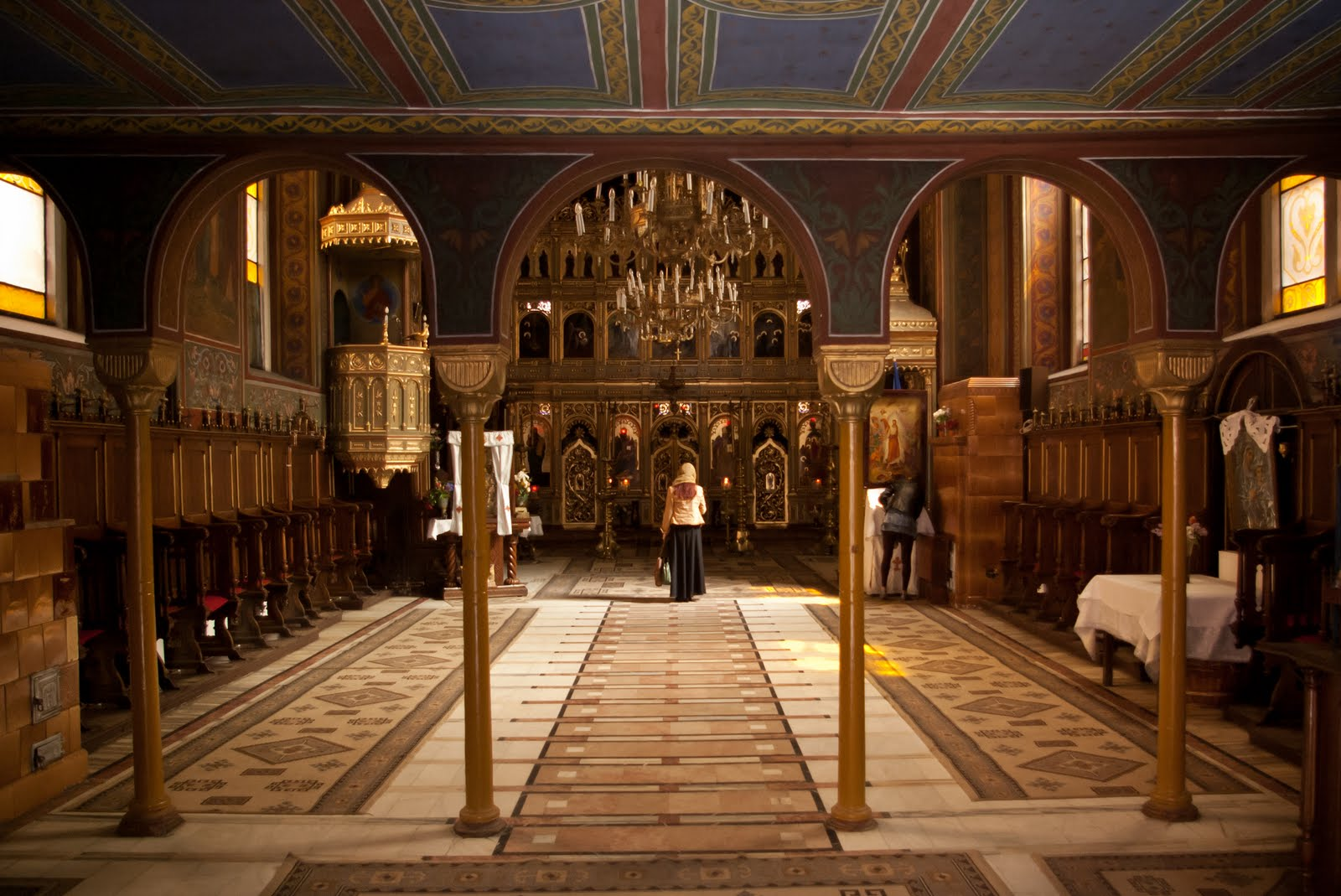
Interior of the church

The church was painted in fresco from 1783 to 1790 by four brothers from Săsăuș; they had established an iconographers’ school in Săcele in 1780. Over time, the work deteriorated, so that by the time the church was repainted in 1946–1949, only small fragments survived. The wooden iconostasis was partly destroyed by fire in 1977, and repaired by 1981. Ioan Bran de Lemény is buried in the graveyard.

The church is listed as a historic monument by Romania's Ministry of Culture and Religious Affairs.
