= Zărnești =

- Town
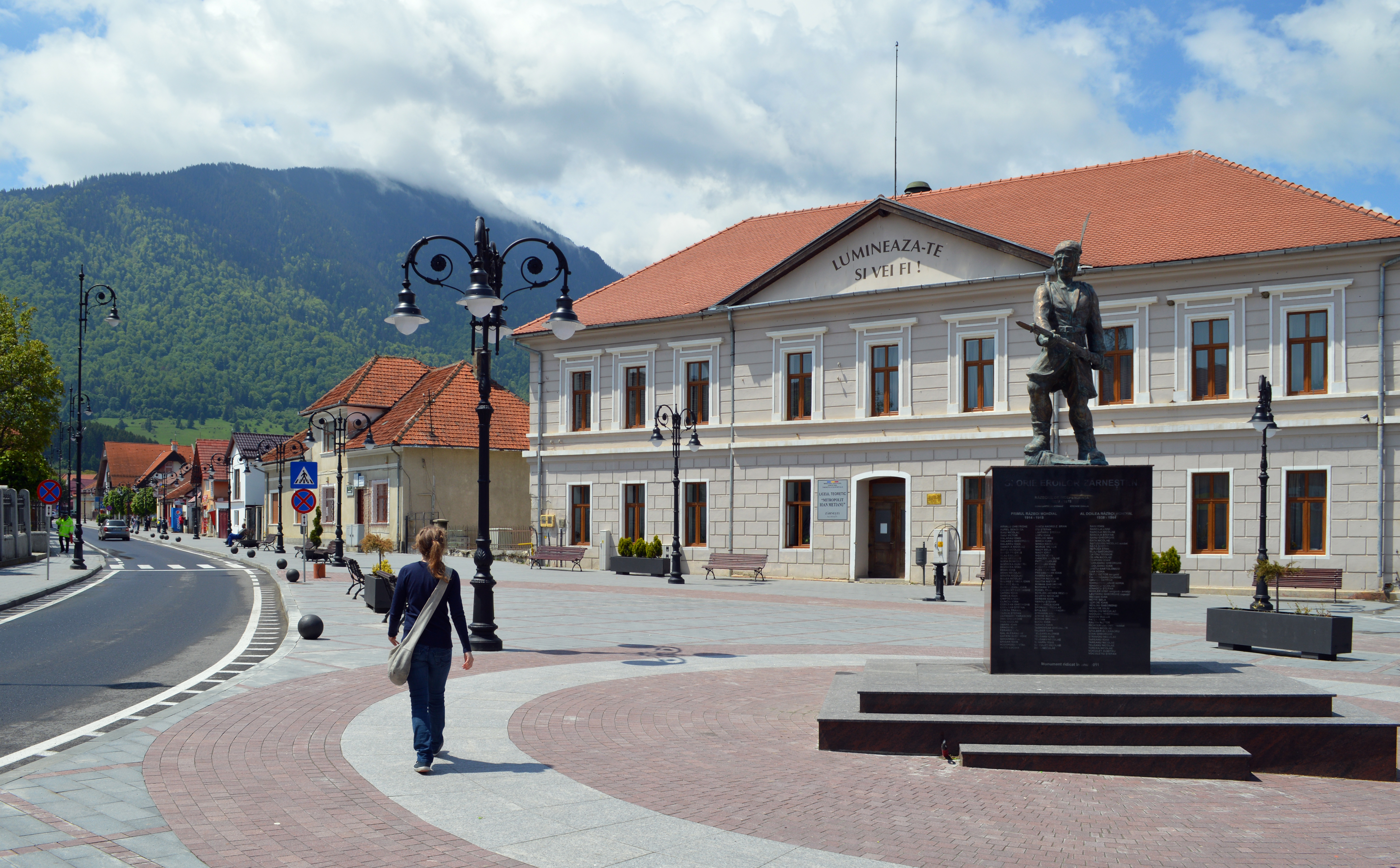
- Town square, Zărnești

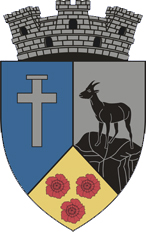
- Coat of arms

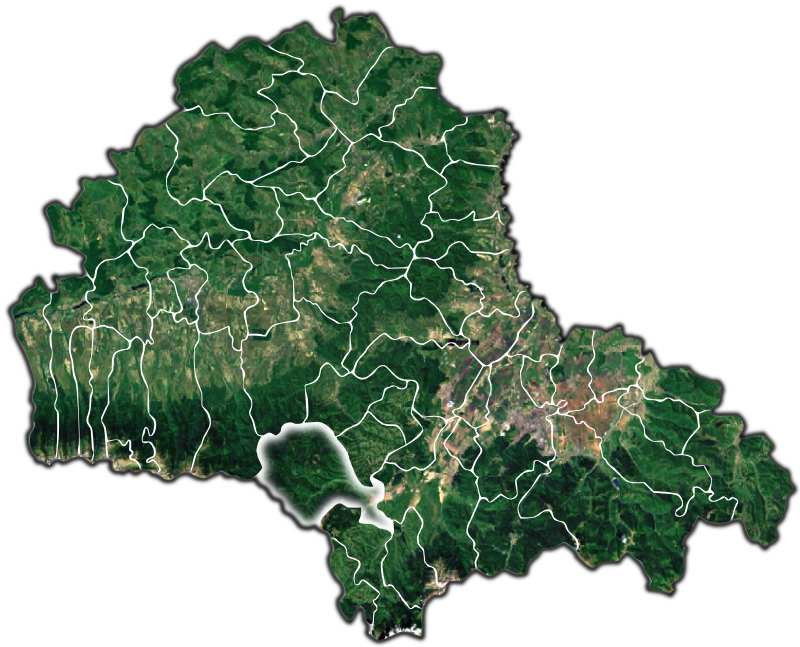
- Location in Brașov County

- Location in Romania
- Coordinates: 45°34′N 25°20′E
- Country: Romania
- County: Brașov

Government
  - Mayor (2024–2028): Alexandru-Lucian Igrișan (PSD)
- Area: 204.75 km^{2} (79.05 sq mi)
- Elevation: 692 m (2,270 ft)
- Population (2021-12-01): 21,624
  - Density: 105.61/km^{2} (273.53/sq mi)
- Time zone: UTC+02:00 (EET)
  - Summer (DST): UTC+03:00 (EEST)
- Postal code: 505800
- Area code: (+40) 02 68
- Vehicle reg.: BV
- Website: www.primaria-zarnesti.ro

Zărnești (Romanian pronunciation: [zərˈneʃtʲ]; German: Molkendorf, Zernescht; Hungarian: Zernest) is a town in Brașov County, Transylvania, Romania, with a population of 21,624 as of 2021. It administers one village, Tohanu Nou (Neu-Tohan; Újtohán).

The town is located near the Piatra Craiului Mountains, which are part of the Southern Carpathians mountain range. Its close proximity to these mountains make it a common start point for tourists and hikers wishing to explore the Piatra Craiului National Park.

== History ==
Historical population
Year	Pop.	±%
1956	6,673	—
1966	17,628	+164.2%
1977	23,288	+32.1%
1992	26,319	+13.0%
2002	26,520	+0.8%
2011	21,681	−18.2%
2021	21,624	−0.3%
Source: Census data

During the Roman period, soldiers of the Legio XIII Gemina were buried in the territory that is modern day Zărnești. It is first mentioned in the year 1373 under the name Zârna and also referred to as "possessio regalis Zerne" in 1395. Other names that appeared after 1437 are Zerna, Villa Czerne, and Zernyest.

Modern day Zărnești developed in the same location as the historic one. The commune of Tohan, which is now part of the town, was first mentioned in the year 1294, and remains among the oldest settlements in Romanian which have kept their name and location unchanged.

In the 1690 Battle of Zernest, Ottoman ally Imre Thököly (in cooperation with Wallachian Voivode Constantin Brâncoveanu) defeated Habsburg forces, which enabled him to become Prince of Transylvania for a short time.

Due to the topographical diversity of Zărnești and surrounding area, agriculture became the primary occupation for its residents until not too long ago. Industrialization began sometime in the 1800s, with the construction of the paper manufacturing plant in 1852, then called Celuloza, now called Celohart – EcoPaper"), and the weapons plant "6 Martie" in 1936. These projects turned Zărnești from a predominantly rural to an urban town.

In December 1939, disaster hit the town as 24 tons of chlorine gas were spilled, killing 60 people, even at considerable distance from the plant where a storage vessel failed.

The town of Zărnești developed largely in the communist era, bringing its population to 25,000 people, which contributed to the addition of a few neighborhoods of communist era blocs. In 1951, Zărnești was declared a town, of which Tohanul Vechi (Old Tohan) became a part of. In 1968, the commune of Tohanul Nou (New Tohan) was included in Zărnești proper. After the Romanian Revolution of 1989, the industrial plants closed, only to be sold piece by piece to private buyers.

Currently, Zărnești enjoys a spike in tourism, relieving some of the pressure of unemployment which followed the revolution.

== Name ==
The Romanian name "Zărnești" is a derivation from zârnă (Black Nightshade), a word of Slavic origin (from Old Church Slavonic зрьно, grain) and suffix -ești.

== Climate ==
Zărnești has a warm-summer humid continental climate (Dfb in the Köppen climate classification).

Climate data for Zărnești
Month	Jan	Feb	Mar	Apr	May	Jun	Jul	Aug	Sep	Oct	Nov	Dec	Year
Mean daily maximum °C (°F)	−0.2 (31.6)	1.7 (35.1)	6.1 (43.0)	12.2 (54.0)	17 (63)	20.2 (68.4)	22.1 (71.8)	22.4 (72.3)	17.5 (63.5)	12.4 (54.3)	7.3 (45.1)	1.4 (34.5)	11.7 (53.1)
Daily mean °C (°F)	−4.2 (24.4)	−2.6 (27.3)	1.6 (34.9)	7.4 (45.3)	12.6 (54.7)	16.2 (61.2)	18 (64)	18 (64)	13.2 (55.8)	7.9 (46.2)	3.2 (37.8)	−2.3 (27.9)	7.4 (45.3)
Mean daily minimum °C (°F)	−8 (18)	−6.7 (19.9)	−2.9 (26.8)	2.3 (36.1)	7.6 (45.7)	11.6 (52.9)	13.4 (56.1)	13.5 (56.3)	9.1 (48.4)	3.9 (39.0)	−0.2 (31.6)	−5.7 (21.7)	3.2 (37.7)
Average precipitation mm (inches)	45 (1.8)	45 (1.8)	62 (2.4)	94 (3.7)	135 (5.3)	139 (5.5)	137 (5.4)	118 (4.6)	78 (3.1)	60 (2.4)	53 (2.1)	52 (2.0)	1,018 (40.1)
Source: https://en.climate-data.org/europe/romania/brasov/zarnesti-15498/

== Notable people ==
- Ioan Bran de Lemény, lawyer, revolutionary, and Transylvania's first Romanian civil servant
- Gheorghe Crăciun, writer and translator
- Eduard-Michael Grosu, professional racing cyclist, born in Zărnești
- Alexandru Ilie, professional footballer
- Ioan Mețianu, cleric of the Romanian Orthodox Church
- Traian Moșoiu, World War I general, born in Tohanul Nou
- Ion Monea, boxing champion, born in Tohanul Vechi

== Photo gallery ==
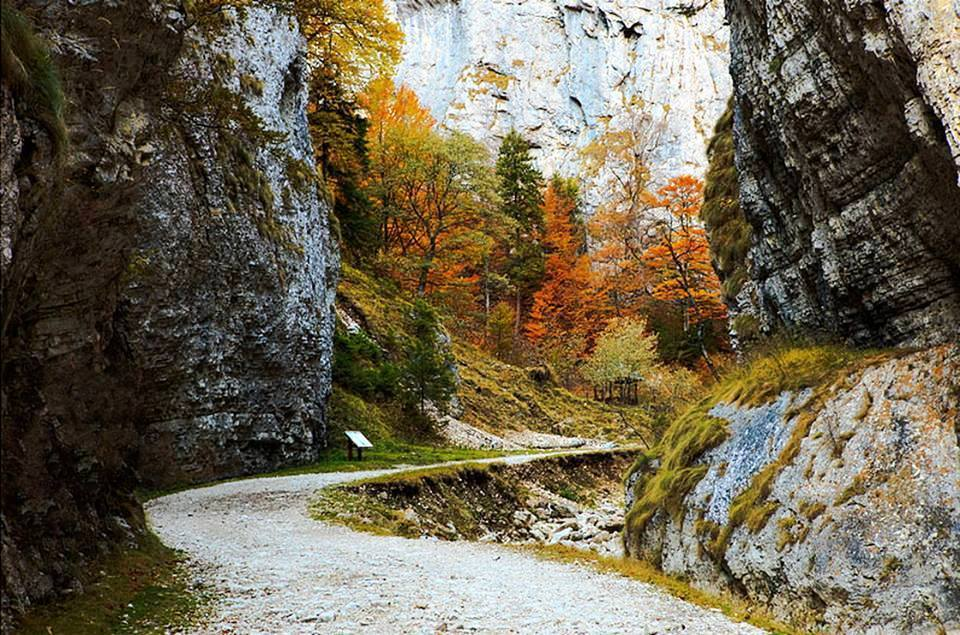
The cliffs of Zărnești

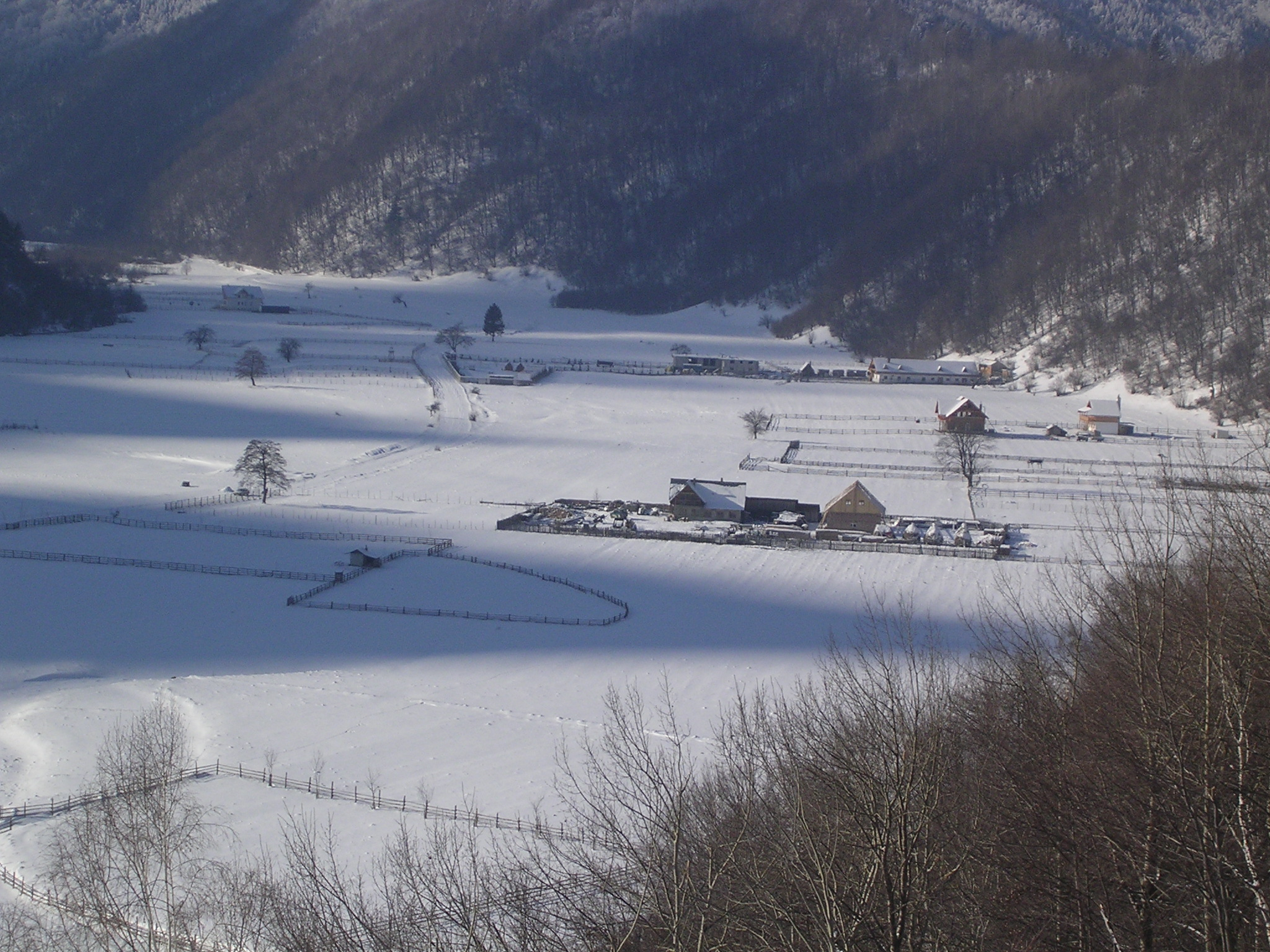
The valley of Zărnești

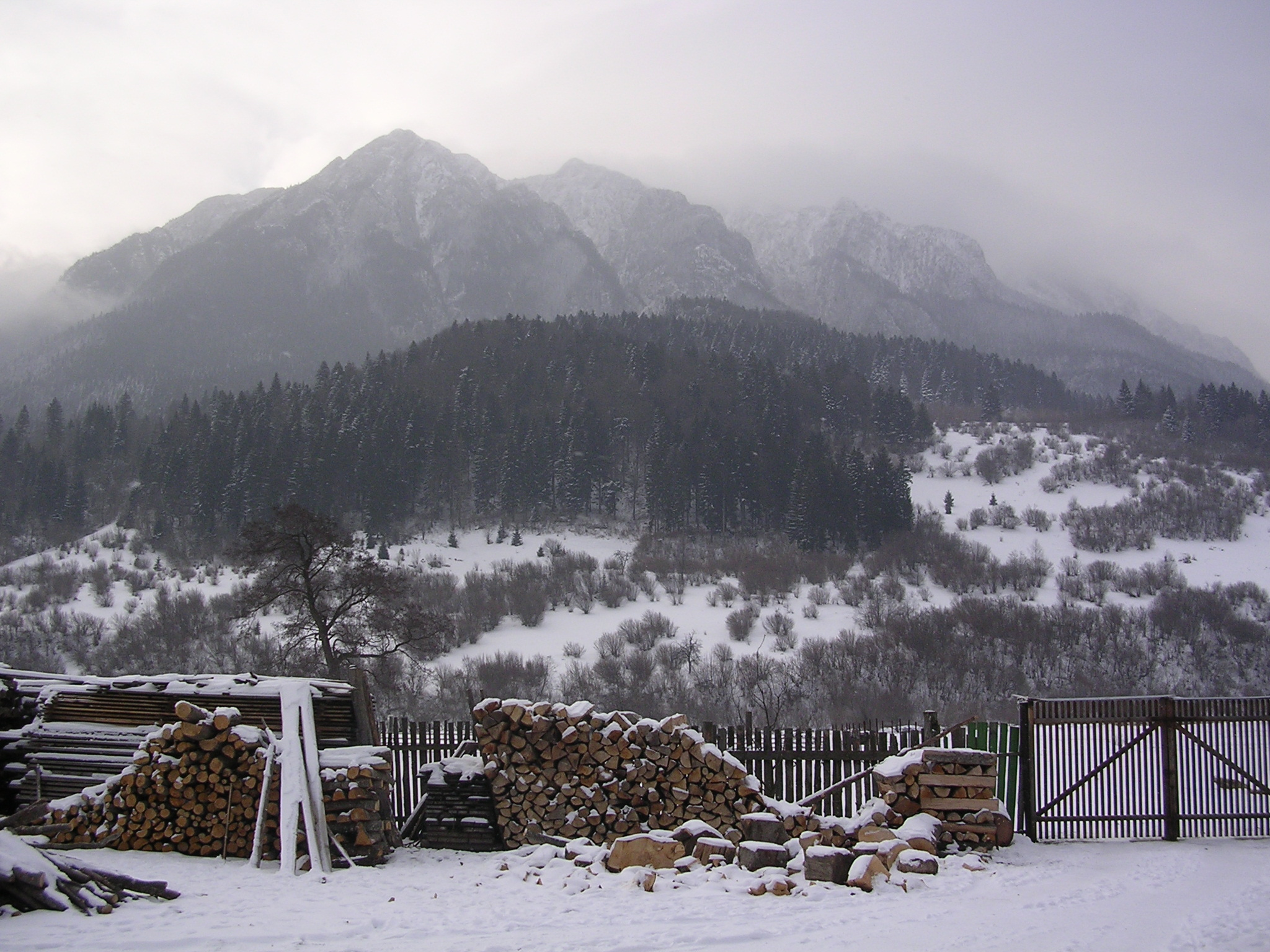
View of the Piatra Craiului Mountains from Zărnești

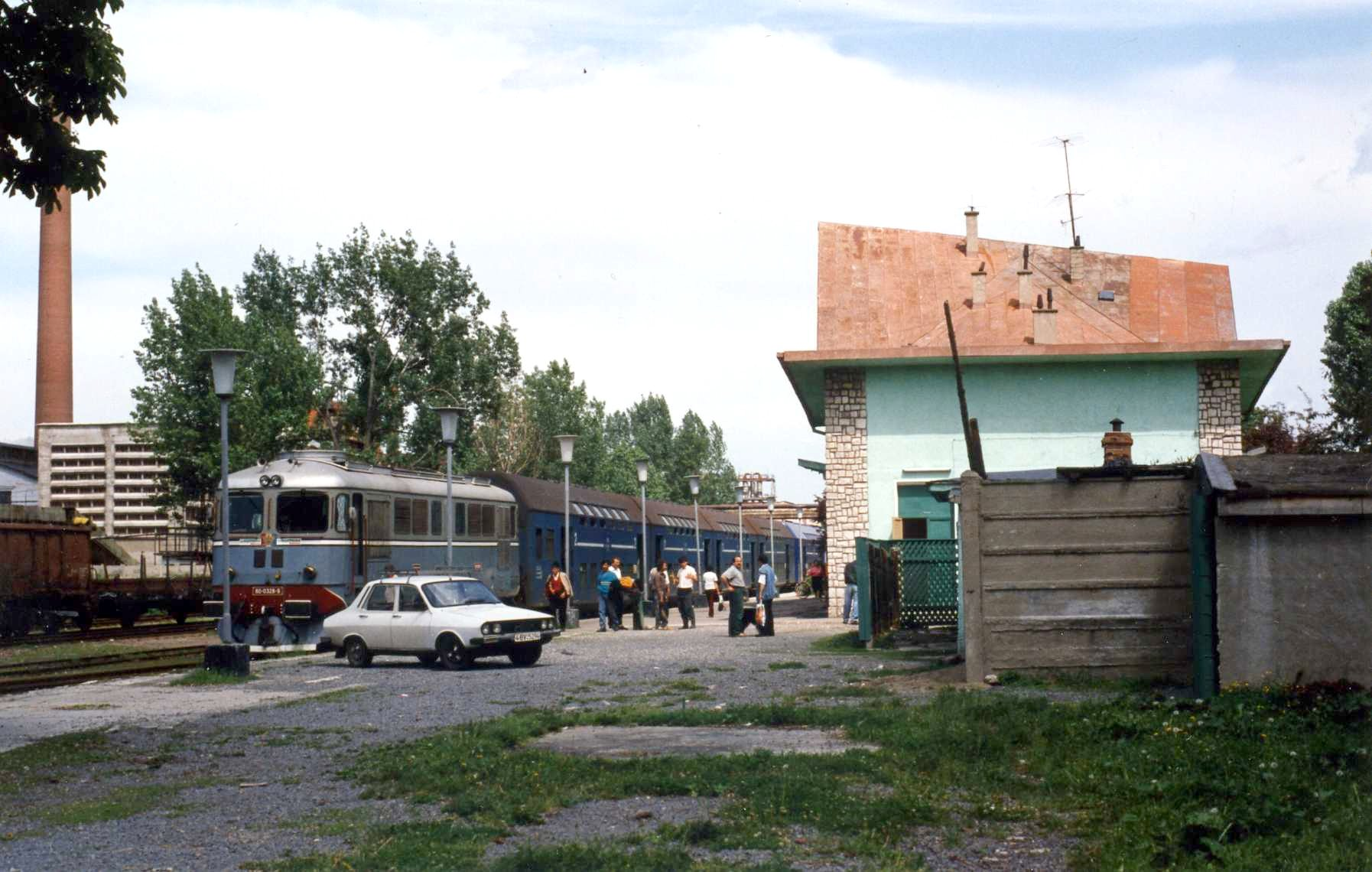
Zărnești railway station

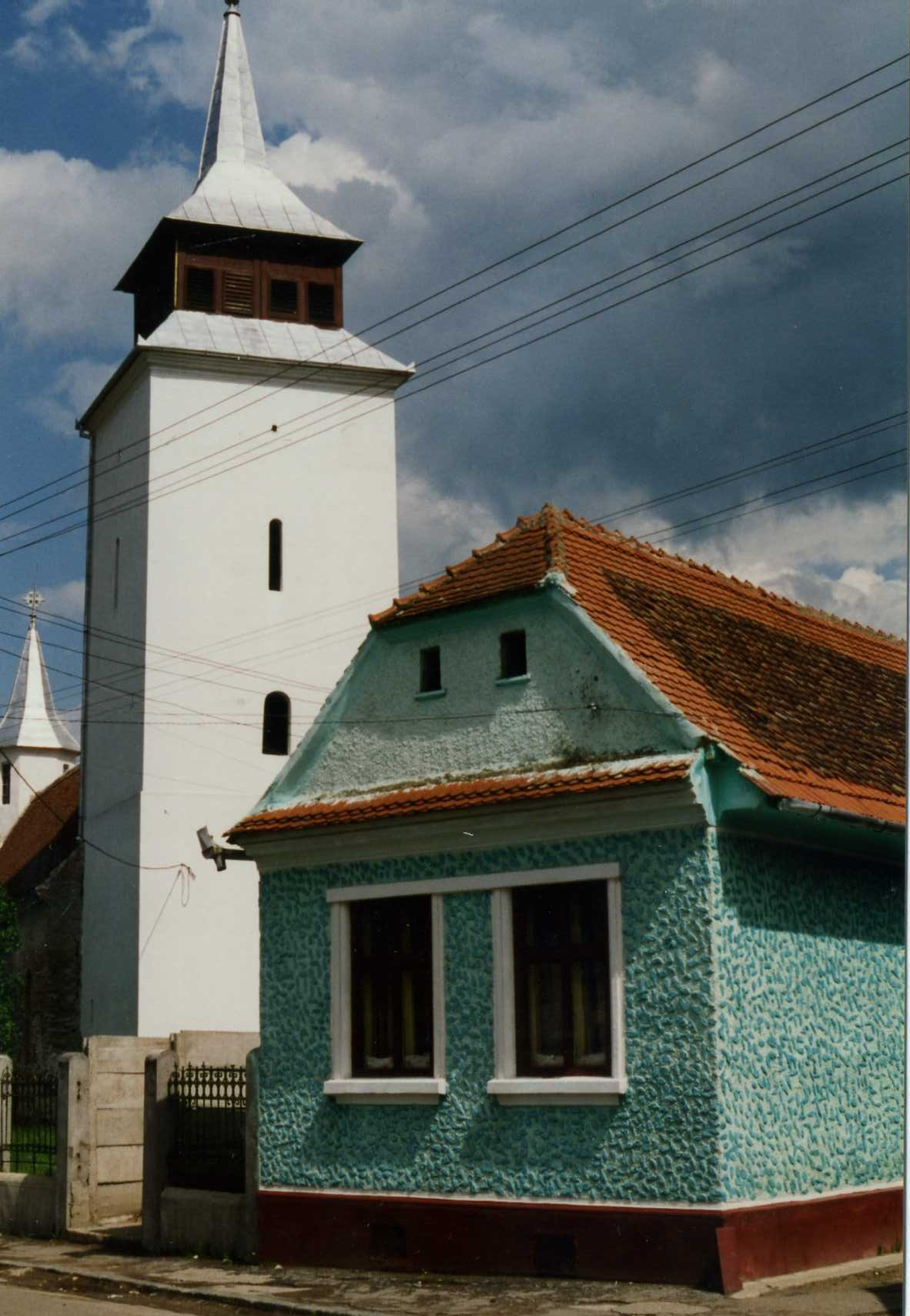
Saint Nicholas Church
