= Piatra Craiului National Park =

Protected area in Romania

Coordinates: 45°31′37″N 25°12′42″E

- Parcul Național Piatra Craiului
- IUCN category II (national park)
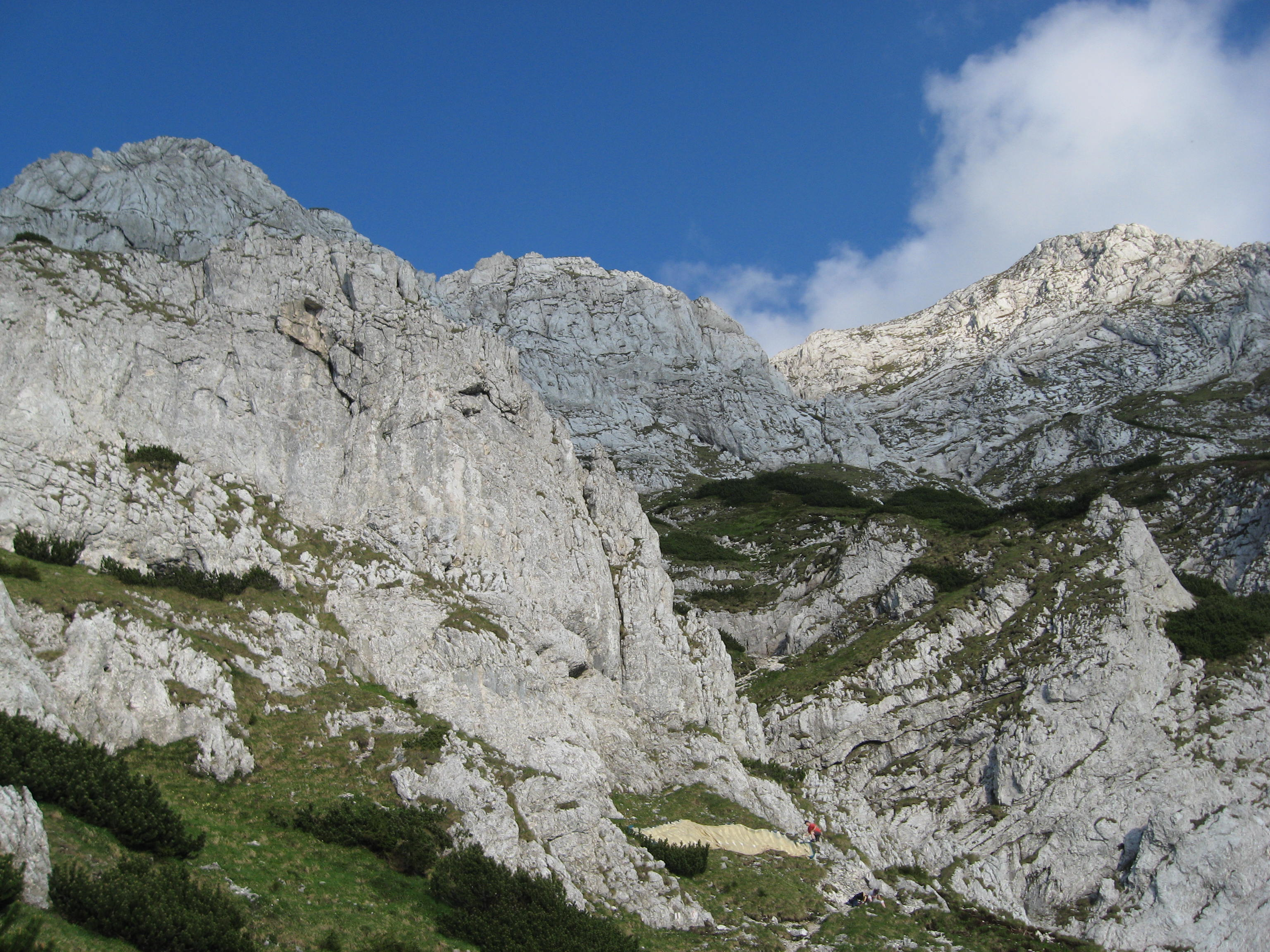
- The "Peak of the Middle" (creasta de mijloc)
- Interactive map of Piatra Craiului National Park
- Location: Argeș and Brașov counties, Romania
- Area: 14,773 ha (36,500 acres)
- Established: 1938 (natural area), 1990 (national park)

Piatra Craiului National Park is a protected area of national interest in Romania corresponding to IUCN category II (national park), located on the territories of Argeș (6,967 ha.) and Brașov (7,806 ha) counties. Located on the Piatra Craiului Massif, it is largely karstic.

== Location ==
The natural area extends in the north-eastern extremity of Argeș county (on the administrative territories of Dâmbovicioara, Dragoslavele, Rucăr communes) and in the southern part of Brasov county (on the territories of Fundata, Moieciu and Bran communes and the town of Zărnești), near the national road DN73A connecting Predeal town to Șercaia.

The National Park is located in the Piatra Craiului Massif, a mountainous group belonging to the north-western part of the Southern Carpathian chain and covering a total area of 14,773 ha.

== History ==
The natural area of Piatra Craiului Massif was established on 28 March 1938 by a decision of the Council of Ministers, published in the Journal of the Council of Ministers No. 645 of 1938, and in the course of time the protected area increased its area in several stages, and in 1990 the area was declared a national park and reconfirmed by Law No. 5 of 6 March 2000 (on the approval of the National Territorial Planning Plan - Section III - protected areas).

In 2003, Government Decision No. 230 of 4 March 2003 (on the delimitation of biosphere reserves, national parks and nature parks and the establishment of their administrations) re-established the boundaries and area of the national park.

== Description ==
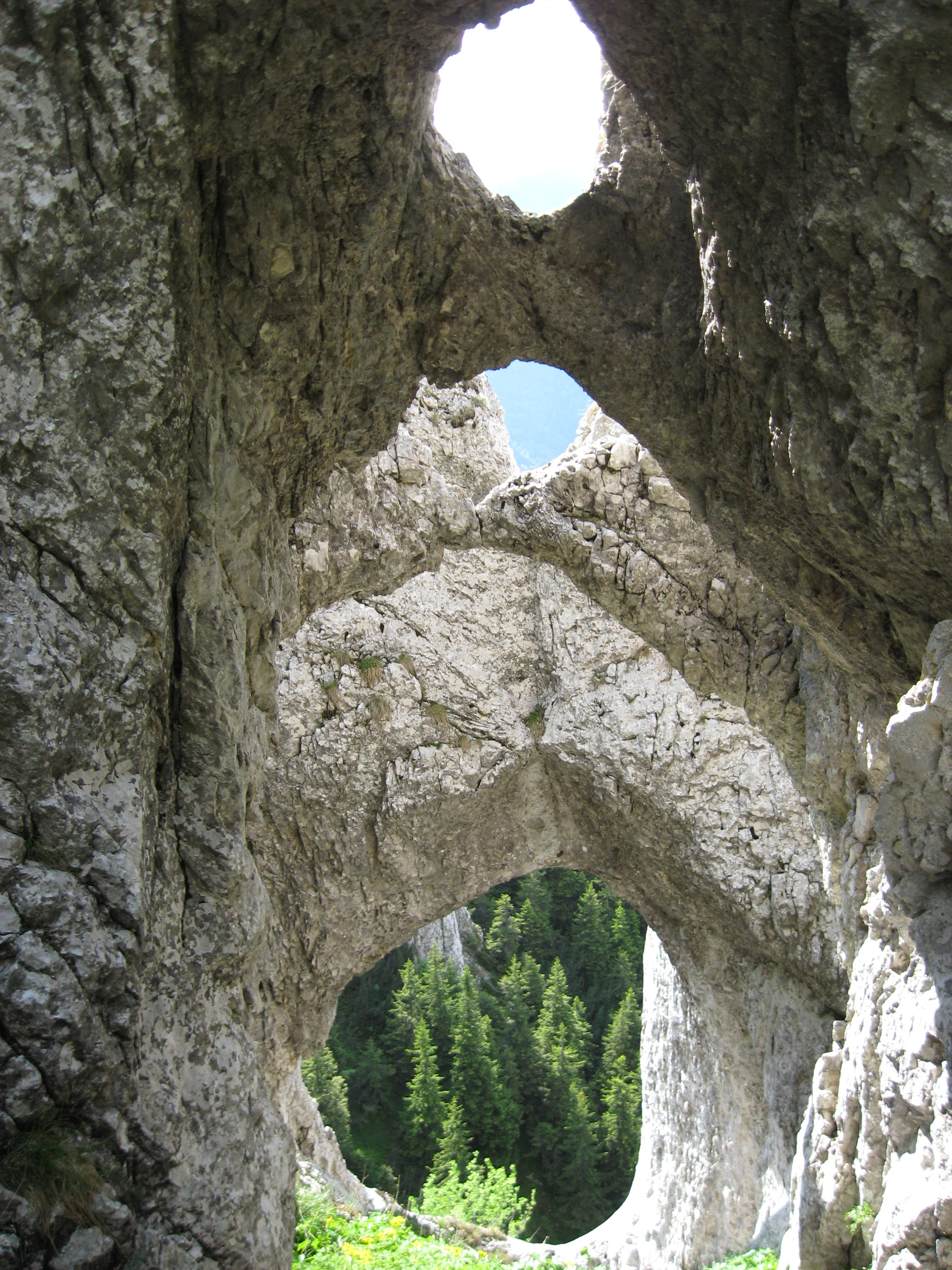
The La Zaplaz karstic feature

Piatra Craiului National Park is an area with steep peaks (Țimbalul Mare Peak - 2,177 m, Vârful dintre Țimbale - 2. 170 m) of metamorphic rock, limestone cliffs of Jurassic age, grottoes, alpine hollows, gorges (Zărneștiului Gorge, Vlădușca Gorge, Dâmbovicioarei Gorge), caves, marshland, watercourses and karst areas (Cerdacul Stanciului, Padina lui Calinet, Prăpastiile Zărneștiului, Fântâna Domnilor, Fântâna lui Botorog, La Zaplaz) resulting from erosion and dissolution of rocks; mountain meadows, meadows, pastures, and wooded areas.

The national park overlaps the site of Community importance - Piatra Craiului and includes the nature reserves: Cheile Zărneștilor (protected area of geological, floristic, faunistic and landscape interest, also known as Prăpăstiile Zărneștilor), Peștera Liliecilor (Rucăr-Bran), Peștera Dâmbovicioara, Avenul din Grind, Zona kartica Dâmbovicioara - Brusturet, Peștera Dobreștilor, Peștera nr. 15, Stanciului Cave and Uluce Cave.

== Biodiversity ==
=== Habitats ===
The natural area has several types of habitats (Alpine and boreal scrub, scrub with sub-arctic Salix species, scrub with Pinus mugo and Rhododendron myrtifolium, calcareous rock communities or basifid grasslands of Alysso-Sedion albi, lowland communities with hygrophilous tall grasses, alpine and sub-alpine calcareous meadows, mountain meadows, caves where public access is forbidden, alluvial forests with Alnus glutinosa and Fraxinus excelsior (Alno-Padion, Alnion incanae, Salicion albae), Dacian beech forests (Symphyto-Fagion), relict Pinus sylvestris forests on limestone substrate, Luzulo-Fagetum beech forests, Middle-European beech forests of Cephalanthero-Fagion, Picea abies acidophilous forests in the mountain region (Vaccinio-Piceetea), Salix sub-arctic scrub, rocky slopes with chasmophytic vegetation on siliceous rocks, herbaceous vegetation on the banks of mountain streams, woody vegetation with Myricaria germanica along mountain streams, and limestone and limestone shale grottoes from the mountain to the alpine floor (Thlaspietea rotundifolii), which support a diverse range of flora and fauna specific to Pietra Craiului.

=== Flora ===
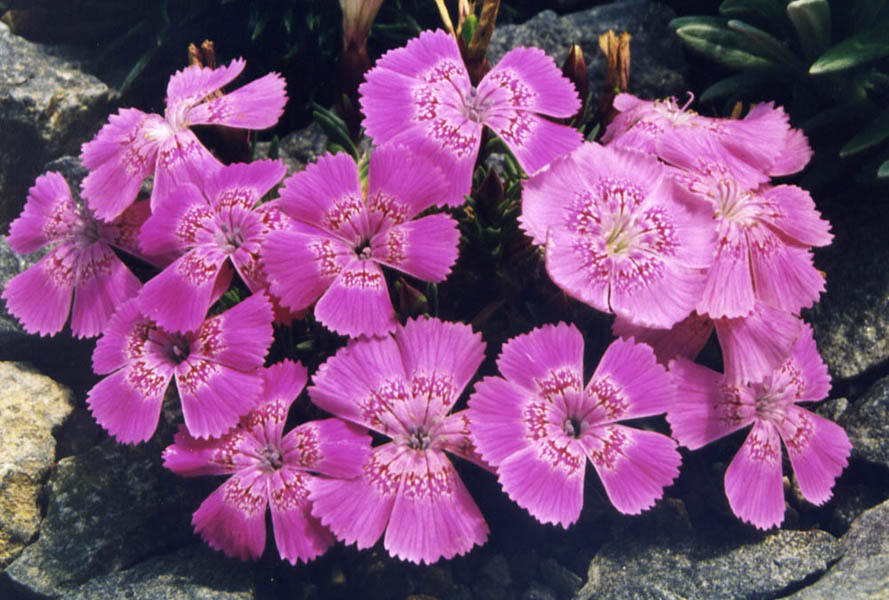
Dianthus callizonus, endemic to the Piatra Craiului Mountains

The flora of the national park is made up of plant species distributed in a tiered manner, in accordance with the geological structure, soil and climate characteristics, geomorphological structure or altitude.

==== Trees and shrubs ====
Coniferous species: spruce (Picea abies), pines (Pinus), fir (Abies alba), larch (Larix decidua), silver fir (Pinus cembra), and yew (Taxus baccata).

Deciduous species with stands of: oaks (Quercus petraea), (Quercus robur), beech (Fagus sylvatica), hornbeam (Carpinus betulus), mountain ash (Acer pseudoplatanus), lime (Tilia cordata), ash (Fraxinus excelsior), wild chestnut (Aesculus hippocastanum), elm (Ulmus glabra), maple (Acer platanoides), sycamore (Acer campestre), birch (Betula pendula), trembling aspen (Populus tremula), mountain maple (Alnus viridis), black maple (Alnus glutinosa), white willow (Salix alba), and goat willow (Salix caprea).

Piatra Craiului National Park is a protected area of national interest corresponding to IUCN category II (national park), located on the territories of Argeș (6,967 ha.) and Brașov (7,806 ha) counties.

The natural area extends in the north-eastern extremity of Argeș county (on the administrative territories of Dâmbovicioara, Dragoslavele, Rucăr communes) and in the southern part of Brasov county (on the territories of Fundata, Moieciu and Bran communes and the town of Zărnești), near the national road DN73A connecting Predeal town to Șercaia.

The National Park is located in the Piatra Craiului Massif, a mountainous group belonging to the north-western part of the Southern Carpathian chain and covering a total area of 14,773 ha.

==== Herbs and flowers ====
At the level of grasses the floristic diversity is represented by several species and subspecies of plants, some of which are protected by law or endemic to this area of the country.

==== The Crater Grass (Dianthus callizonus) ====
The flora species reported in the park area are: the Craiului's rock carnation (Dianthus callizonus), an endemic species that grows only on the rocks and grottoes of the Craiului's Rock, the Voinus bloodwort (Nigritella rubra), the Queen's flower (Leontopodium alpinum), mountain peony (Rhododendron), yellow poppy (Papaver alpinum), white ivy (Daphne blagayana), lady's slipper (Cypripedium calceolus), linaria (Linaria alpina), and carrot (Pleurospermum austriacum), bear's thistle (Heracleum palmatum), bungium (Erigeron uniflorus and Erigeron atticus), wild mixander (Erysimum witmannii), pear blossom (Anthemis tinctoria ssp. fussii), bluebells (Campanula patula ssp. abietina), orchids (with species of: Cephalanthera longifolia, Gymnadenia conopsea, Gymnadenia odoratissima), tits (Cephalanthera rubra), boxwood (Corallorhiza trifida), carnation (with species of: Dianthus glacialis ssp. gelidus, Dianthus tenuifolius, Dianthus giganteus ssp. banaticus, Dianthus henteri), gentian (Gentiana clusii), cowslip (Orchis morio), poroinic (Orchis ustulata), devil's-bit (Phyteuma tetramerum), fat-leaf (Pinguicula alpina), buttercup (Plantago atrata) and darnel (Pedicularis exaltata).

=== Fauna ===
The park's fauna is diverse and represented by several species of mammals, birds, fish, amphibians and reptiles, some protected by law and on the IUCN red list.

==== Mammals ====
Species of mammals: Carpathian bear (Ursus arctos), red deer (Cervus elaphus), roe deer (Capreolus capreolus), black goat (Rupicapra rupicapra), wolf (Canis lupus), Eurasian lynx (Lynx lynx), tree marten (Martes martes), fox (Vulpes vulpes), wild boar (Sus scrofa), squirrel (Sciurus carolinensis), broad-eared bat (Barbastella barbastellus), long-winged bat (Miniopterus schreibersii), common bat (Myotis myotis), mouse-eared bat (Myotis blythii), large horseshoe bat (Rhinolophus ferrumequinum), small horseshoe bat (Rhinolophus hipposideros), field mice (Crocidura leucodon), (Micromys minutus), and shrews (Sorex minutus), (Sorex araneus), and (Sorex alpinus).
