= Piatra Craiului Mountains =

Mountain range in Romania

Piatra Craiului
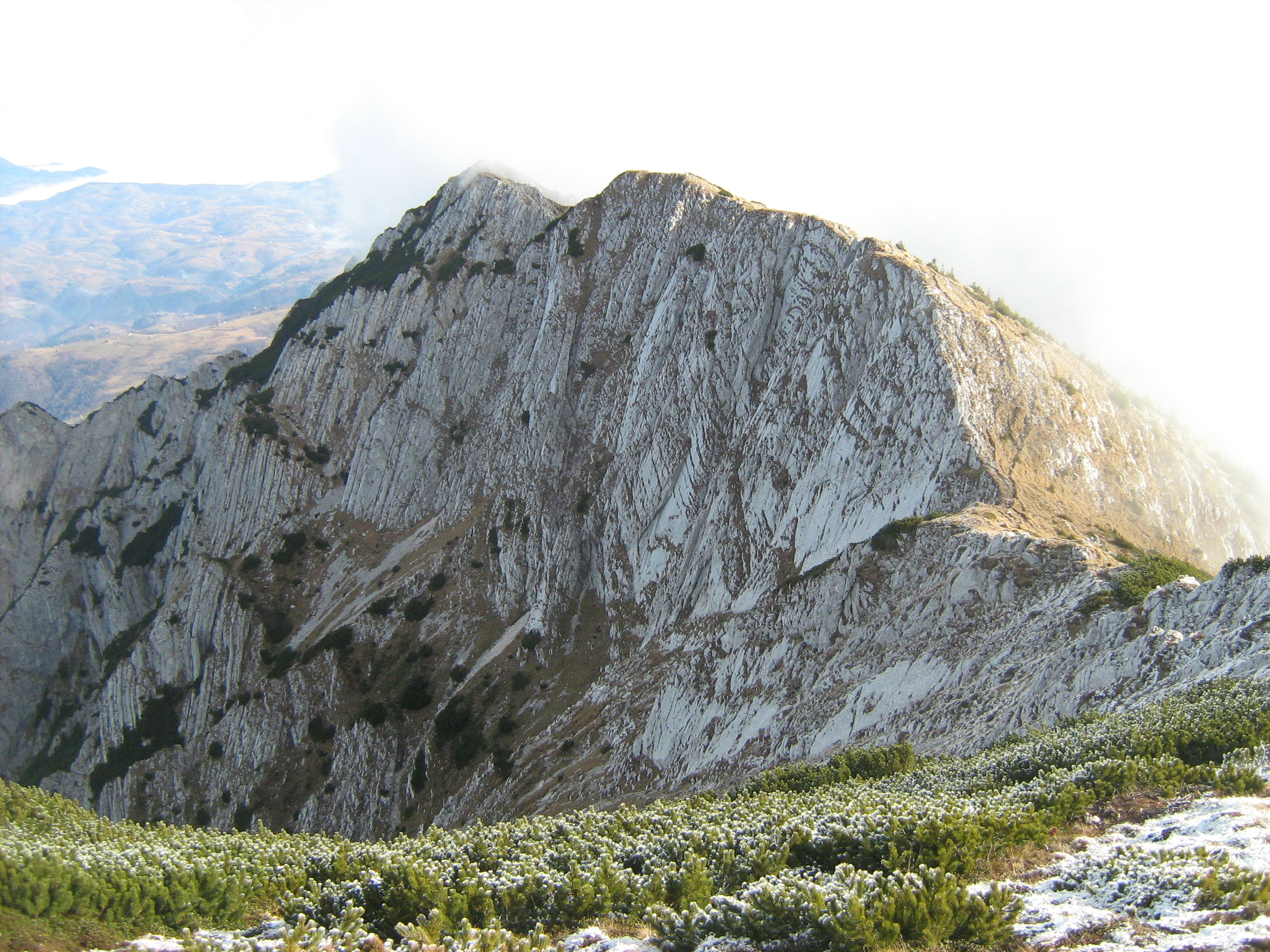

Highest point
- Peak: Vârful La Om
- Elevation: 2,238 m (7,343 ft)
- Coordinates: 45°32′N 25°13′E

Naming
- English translation: The King's Rock
- Language of name: Romanian

Geography
- Location: Romania
- Counties: Brașov, Argeș
- Parent range: Southern Carpathians

Piatra Craiului Mountains, 3D animation elevation of 120%

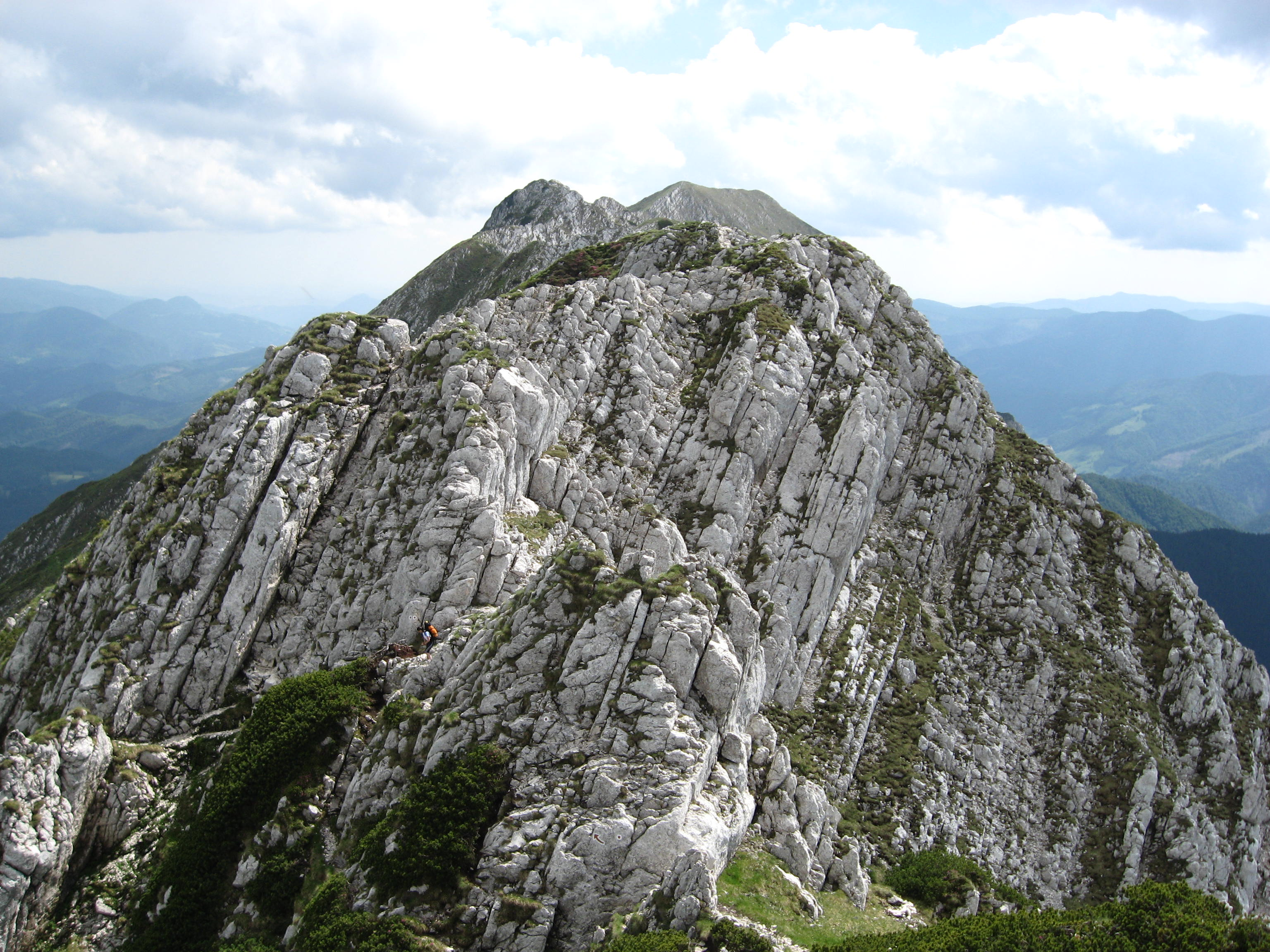
Piatra Craiului main ridge

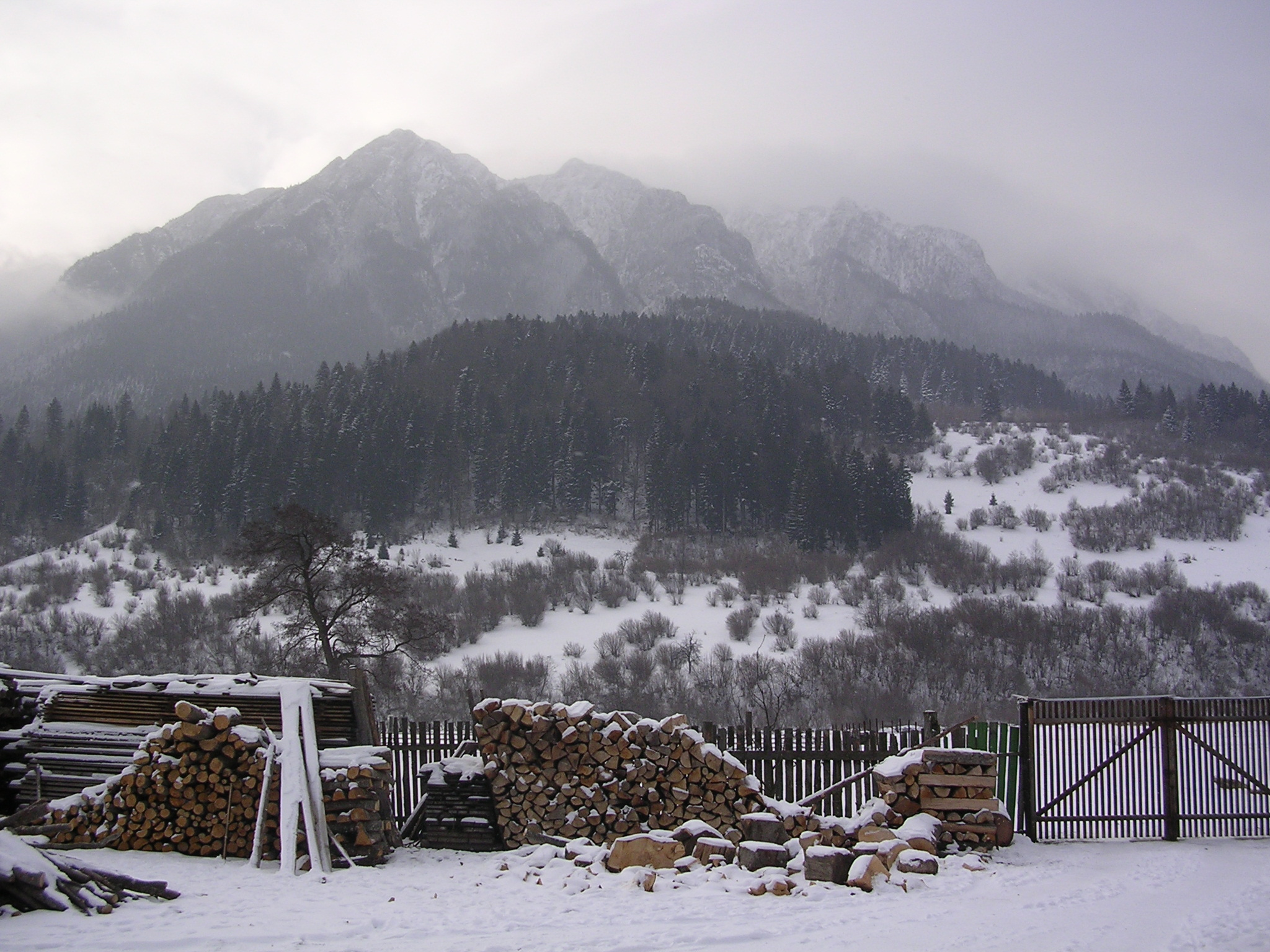
View towards the ridge

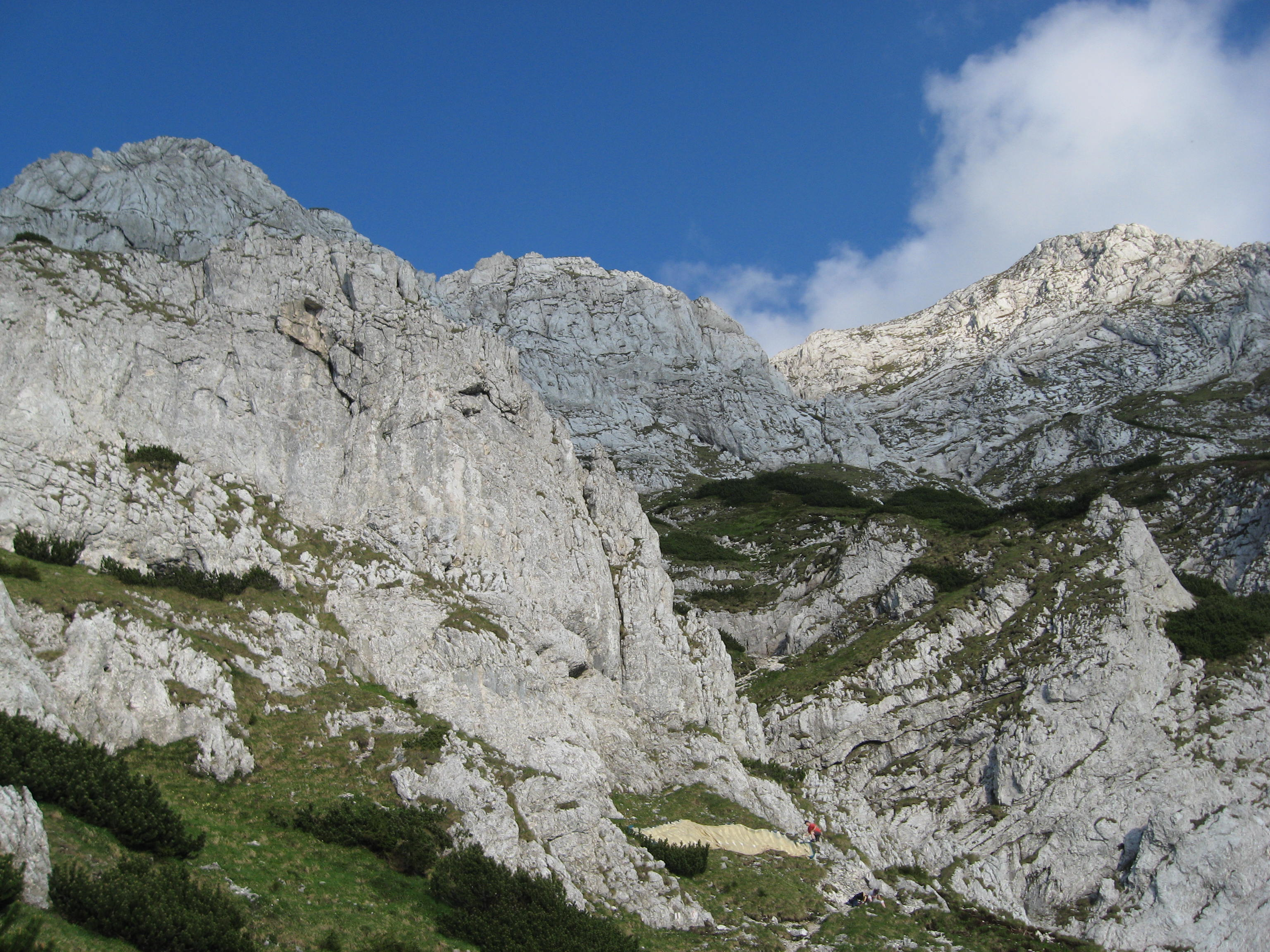
Middle segment

The Piatra Craiului Mountains (German: Königstein, Hungarian: Királykő-hegység) are a mountain range in the Southern Carpathians in Romania. Its name is translated as Kings' Rock or The Rock of the Prince. The mountain range is located in Brașov and Argeș counties; it is included in the Piatra Craiului National Park, which covers an area of 14,766 hectares (60 sq mi).

The Piatra Craiului mountains form a narrow and saw-like ridge, which is about 25 km (16 mi) long. The highest elevation in the massif is the Vârful La Om at 2,238 metres (7,343 ft). The ridge is regarded as one of the most beautiful sites in the Carpathians. The two-day north–south ridge trail is both challenging and rewarding. Starting at either Plaiul Foii in the north-west or Curmătura in the north-east, walkers climb up to the ridge before following a somewhat precarious path along the narrow spine. The descent at the southern end leads into a karst landscape of deep gorges and pitted slopes where water penetrating the rock has carved a series of caves.

== Location ==
The massif is bordered in the west by the Dâmbovița River, which separates it from the Iezer–Păpușa Massif. In the north-west, the Bârsa River and the Curmătura Foii gorge separate it from the Făgăraș Mountains. In the east, the Rucăr–Bran Pass delimits it from the Bucegi and Leaota mountains. The southern border is the confluence of the valleys of Dâmbovița and Dâmbovicioara rivers, in the Podul Dâmboviței depression.

== Nature protection ==
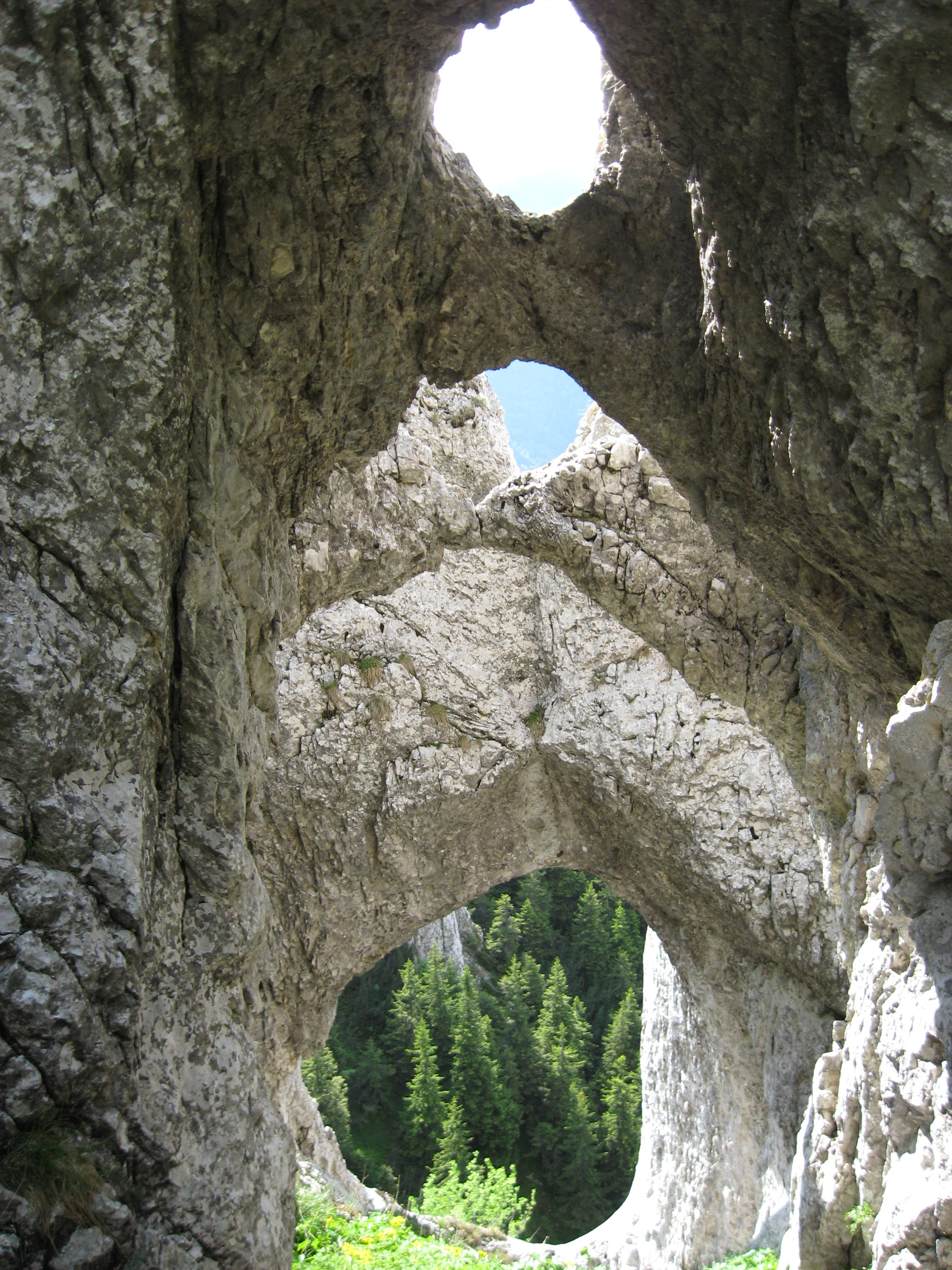
La Zaplaz carstic shapes

The whole range is included in the national park Parcul Național Piatra Craiului (Piatra Craiului National Park). The first protection of this area started in 1938 when 4.4 km^{2} (2 sq mi) were declared as a "Nature Reserve". The Law 5/2000 enlarged this area to 148 km^{2} (57 sq mi). In 2003 the external limits and internal zoning were created. Since 1999 a park administration has existed and since 2005 a management plan has been in place.

In the national park area about 300 fungi species, 220 lichen species, 100 different mosses, 1,100 species of superior plants (a third of the number of all plant species found in Romania), 50 Carpathians endemic species, and also two endemic species for Piatra Craiului can be found.

There are also two endemic species of spiders, 270 butterfly species, amphibians and reptiles, 110 bird species (50 listed in the Bern Convention and 6 in the Bonn Convention), 17 bat species, Carpathian chamois and other large herbivores and also many large carnivores (Eurasian wolf, Eurasian brown bear, Carpathian lynx) living in the national park.

== Access ==
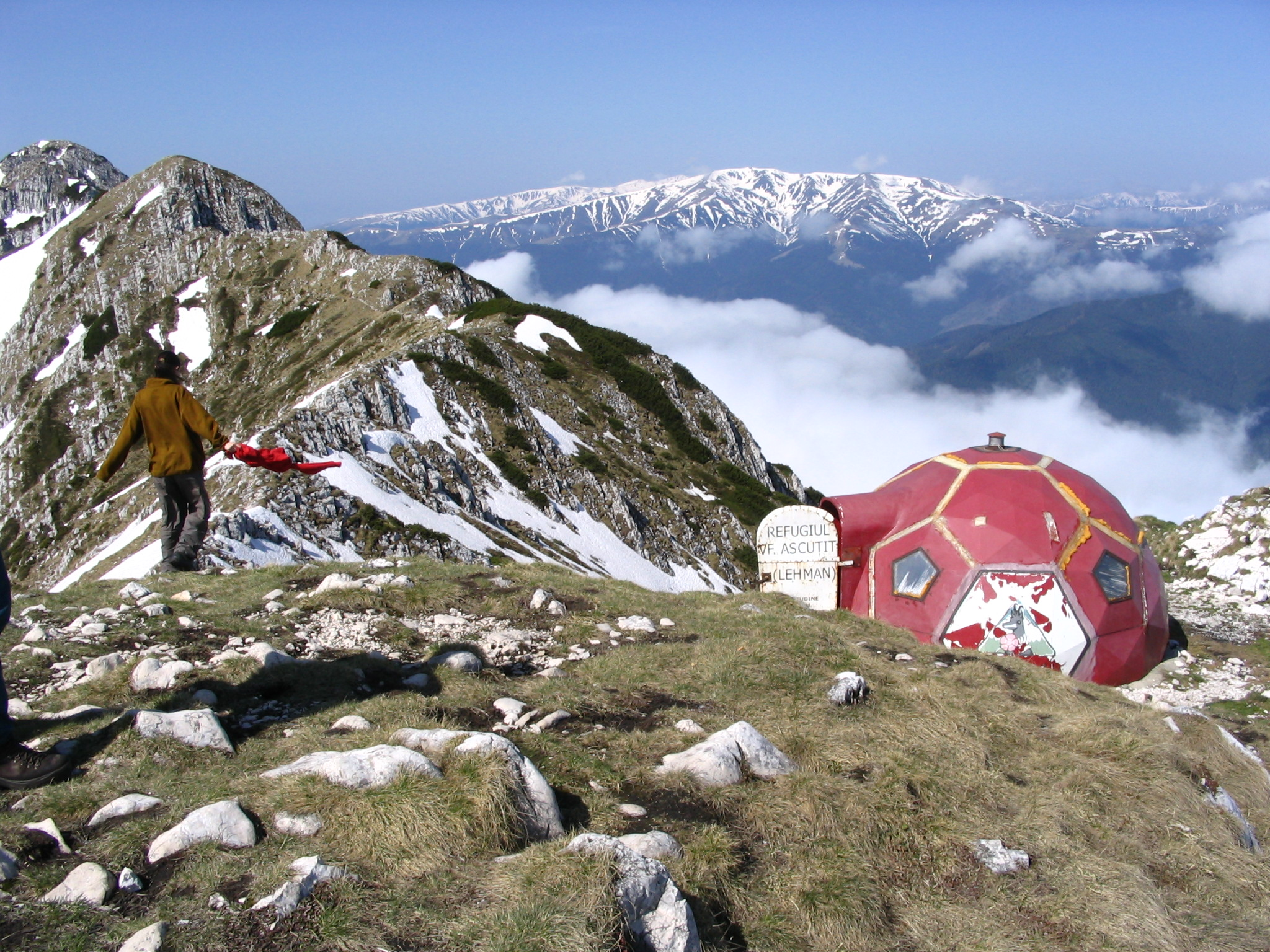
Carol Lehman camp

Zărnești is the most important town for visiting the national park. It is also an ideal starting point for approaches in the northern part of the massif. This town lies at a distance of 28 km (17 mi) from the city of Brașov, by road, bus or railway. From Zărnești, an 11 km (7 mi) long road makes the connection with the chalet "Plaiul Foii", which is a good starting point for climbing the ridge.

Also, from Zărnești a forest road starts from the south-western part of the town, leading through the Zărnești Gorges (Prăpăstiile Zărneștiului) and further up to the ridge. The administrative office of the National Park is located in Zărnești; a new visitor center has been built 1 km (0.6 mi) west of the town.

The traditional villages Măgura, Peștera, Ciocanu, and Șirnea are interesting starting points for the routes on the eastern slope and for getting in touch with the traditional Romanian way of life. Măgura has views towards the Bucegi and Piatra Craiului mountains.

== Activities ==
One of the most common activities in Piatra Craiului is trekking. Prăpăstiile Zărneștilor gorge is one of the most visited sights in the massif. Because of its tall, steep walls, it is also suitable for mountain climbing. In early October, a trail-running competition takes place in Piatra Craiului National Park; the Piatra Craiului Marathon has a length of 42 kilometres (26 mi) and elevation gain of 2,300 metres (7,500 ft).

== In popular culture ==
- The 2003 movie Cold Mountain, starring Nicole Kidman and Jude Law, was shot in Prăpastiile Zărneștiului, a gorge which is the starting point for most trails towards Piatra Craiului.

== See also ==
- Seven Natural Wonders of Romania
