= Dâmbovicioara (river) =

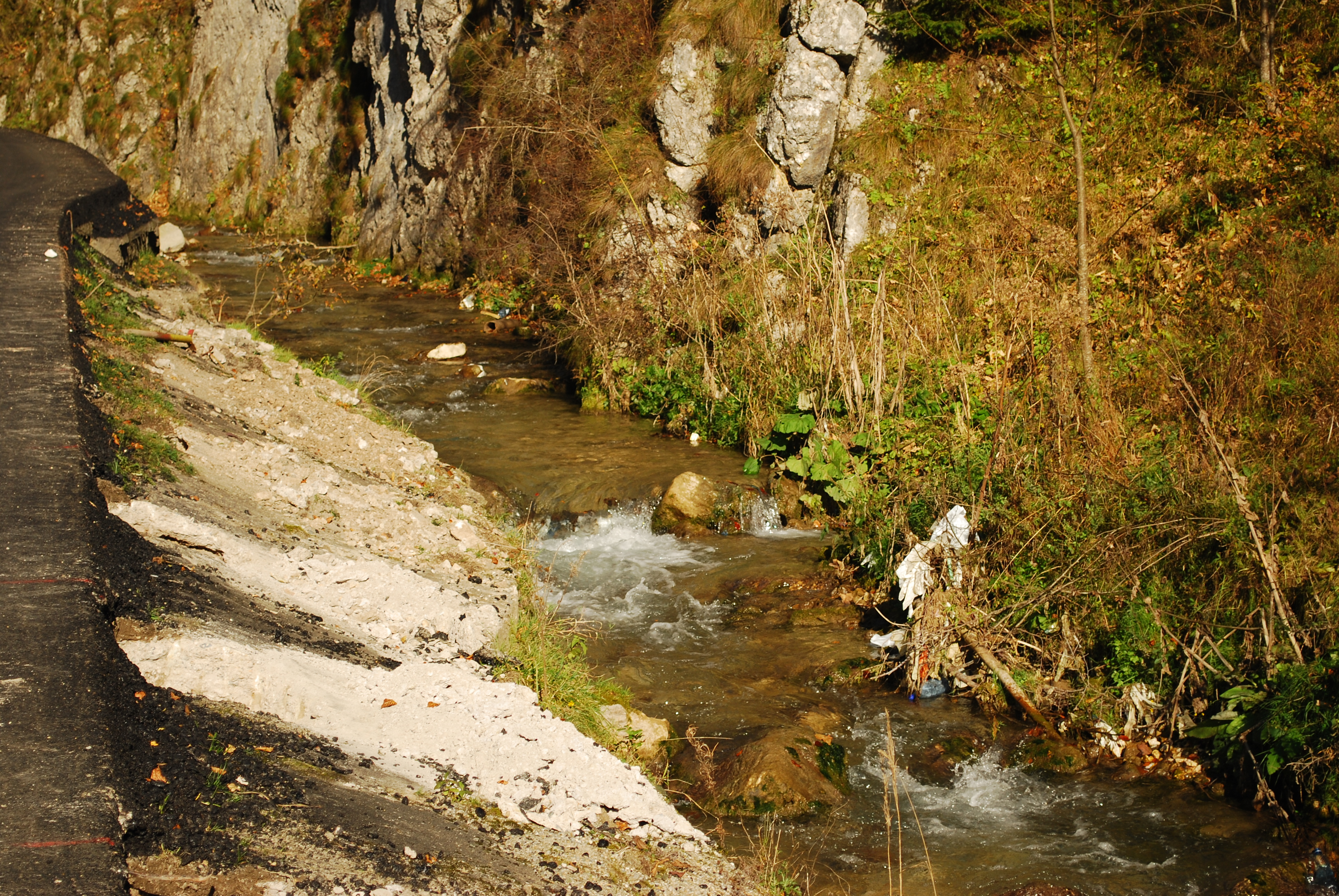

- Location within Romania

Location
- Country: Romania
- Counties: Argeș County
- Villages: Dâmbovicioara

Physical characteristics
- Source: Piatra Craiului Mountains
- Mouth: Dâmbovița
  - coordinates: 45.4116°N 25.2001°E
- Length: 13 km (8.1 mi)
- Basin size: 47 km^{2} (18 sq mi)

Basin features
- Progression: Dâmbovița→ Argeș→ Danube→ Black Sea
- River code: X.1.25.3

The Dâmbovicioara is a left tributary of the river Dâmbovița in Romania. Its source is in the Piatra Craiului Mountains. It flows into the Dâmbovița in Podu Dâmboviței. Its length is 13 km (8.1 mi) and its basin size is 47 km^{2} (18 sq mi). Upstream from its confluence with the Valea cu Apă it is also called Valea Seacă a Pietrelor, and between the confluences with the Valea cu Apă and Valea Muierii it is also called Brusturet.

== Tributaries ==
The following rivers are tributaries to the river Dâmbovicioara (from source to mouth):

- Left: Padina Dâncioarei
- Right: Vâlcelul Găinii, Cheia de sub Grind, Valea Căpățânelor, Valea Lespezilor, Valea lui Stinghie, Valea cu Apă, Valea Muierii, Valea Peșterii, Valea Popii
