= List of Dahlia species =

There are 42 accepted species of flowering plants in the genus Dahlia, according to The Plant List. The sectional classification of Dahlia sensu Sørensen (1969) as updated by Saar et al. (2003) and Hansen (2004) and (2008) is as follows (excluding infraspecific taxa);

== Section Pseudodendron Sherff ==
Image	Scientific name	Chromosome Count	Distribution
	D. campanulata Saar, Sørensen, & Hjerting	2n = 32	Mexico (Guerrero and Oaxaca)
	D. excelsa Bentham	2n = 32	Mexico
	D. imperialis Rozel ex Ortgies	2n = 32	Mexico, Belize, Guatemala, Honduras, El Salvador, Nicaragua, Costa Rica, Panama and south into Colombia and Ecuador
	D. tenuicaulis Sørensen	2n = 32	Mexico (Oaxaca, Jalisco, Michoacan)

== Section Entemophyllon Sørensen ==
Image	Scientific name	Chromosome Count	Distribution
	D. congestifolia Sørensen	2n = 34	Mexico (Hidalgo)
	D. dissecta S. Watson	2n = 34	Mexico (Tamaulipas)
	D. foeniculifolia Sherff	2n = 34	Mexico (Nuevo León, Tamaulipas)
	D. linearis Sherff	2n = 34	Mexico ( Guanajuato, Querétaro)
	D. rupicola Sørensen	2n = 34	Mexico (Durango)
	D. scapigeroides Sherff	2n = 34	Mexico (Guanajuato, Hidalgo, Querétaro)
	D. sublignosa (Sørensen) Saar & Sørensen	2n = 34	Mexico (Tamaulipas)

== Section Dahlia Sherff ==
Subsection	Image	Scientific name	Chromosome Count	Distribution
Subsection Dahlia		D. apiculata (Sherff) Sørensen	2n = 32	Mexico (Oaxaca, Puebla )
Subsection Dahlia		D. atropurpurea Sørensen	2n = 64	Mexico (Guerrero)
Subsection Dahlia		D. australis (Sherff) Sørensen	2n = 32 or 64	Mexico (Chiapas, Oaxaca, Michoacan), Guatemala
Subsection Dahlia		D. barkeriae Knowles and Westcott	2n = 64	Mexico (Jalisco, Michoacán)
Subsection Dahlia		D. brevis Sørensen	2n = 32	
Subsection Dahlia		D. coccinea Cavanilles	2n = 32 or 64	Mexico
Subsection Dahlia		D. cordifolia (Sessé & Moc.) McVaugh	2n = 32	Mexico (Michoacán)
Subsection Dahlia		D. cuspidata Saar, Sørensen, & Hjerting		Mexico (Guerrero )
Subsection Dahlia		D. hintonii Sherff		Mexico (Guerrero )
Subsection Dahlia		D. hjertingii Hansen and Sørensen		Mexico (Hidalgo)
Subsection Dahlia		D. mollis Sørensen	2n = 32	Mexico (Hidalgo, Guanajuato, Querétaro)
Subsection Dahlia		D. moorei Sherff		Mexico (Hidalgo, Querétaro)
Subsection Dahlia		D. neglecta Saar		Mexico Hidalgo, Guanajuato, Querétaro, Veracruz)
Subsection Dahlia		D. parvibracteata Saar & Sørensen		Mexico ( Jalisco)
Subsection Dahlia		D. pteropoda Sherff	2n = 64	Mexico ( Puebla, Oaxaca)
Subsection Dahlia		D. purpusii Brandg.		Mexico (Chiapas)
Subsection Dahlia		D. rudis Sørensen	2n = 32	Mexico (Distrito Federal, México, Michoacán)
Subsection Dahlia		D. sherffii Sørensen	2n = 32 or 64	Mexico (Chihuahua, Durango, Sinaloa, Jalisco)
Subsection Dahlia		D. scapigera (A. Dietrich) Knowles & Westcott	2n = 32	Mexico (Distrito Federal, Michoacán, Guanajuato, Hidalgo)
Subsection Dahlia		D. sorensenii Hansen & Hjerting	2n = 64	Mexico (Distrito Federal, Michoacán, Hidalgo)
Subsection Dahlia		D. spectabilis Saar, Sørensen, & Hjerting		Mexico (San Luis PotosÍ)
Subsection Dahlia		D. tamaulipana J.Reyes, Islas & Art.Castro	2n = 32	Mexico (Tamaulipas)
Subsection Dahlia		D. tenuis Robinson & Greenman	2n = 32	Mexico (Oaxaca)
Subsection Dahlia		D. tubulata Sørensen	2n = 32	Mexico (Nuevo León, Tamaulipas, Coahuila)
Subsection Dahlia		D. wixarika Art.Castro, Carr.-Ortiz & Aarón Rodr.		Mexico (Durango, Jalisco)
Subsection Merckii Sørensen		D. merckii Lehm.	2n = 36	Mexico ( Monterrey, Puebla, Nuevo León, Oaxaca)

== Section Epiphytum Sherff ==
Image	Scientific name	Chromosome Count	Distribution
	D. macdougallii Sherff	2n = 32	Mexico (Oaxaca)

== Unresolved ==
  - D. pinnata Type (more properly D. × pinnata) Most likely (= D. coccinea × D. sorensenii).
  - D. mixtecana J. Reyes, Islas & Art.Castro (possibly Section Dahlia or Section Entemophyllon)

== See also ==
- List of Dahlia cultivars
