= List of Dahlia cultivars =

The horticultural cultivation of the dahlia plant has resulted in over 57,000 registered cultivars of dahlia. Several of them are listed below.

In North America the American Dahlia Society is responsible for the process of accepting a named variety as a cultivar. They also publish the list of currently found Dahlia Cultivars in North America.

The list of Cultivars then might be divided into at least three lists: (1) Named Cultivars from North America (2) Named Cultivars from the International Dahlia Society, (3) Named Cultivars from the Netherlands

Should this list include historic Cultivars that now can no longer be found? Should this list include photos of the Cultivars? In Europe, and the UK, The International Dahlia Society attempts to be responsible for cultivar names, but there also is a Dahlia Registrar in the Netherlands.

== Dahlia 'Akita' ==
Dahlia 'Akita' is a branching, tuberous tender perennial cultivar with large chrysanthemum petals in shades of dark crimson to red, blending to yellow toward the heart. Their tips are white on the underside. The flowers are as large as 5 in. wide (13 cm). This dahlia belongs to the Novelty Fully Double classification and has won over 60 awards.

Plant Profile: Height:36-48 in. (90–120 cm); Spread: 45 cm (18 in); Hardiness: Half hardy

== Dahlia 'Alfred Grille' ==
Dahlia 'Alfred Grille' is a branching, tuberous, tender, perennial cultivar with large salmon-pink, elongated petals blending to yellow toward their center. The flowers are as large as 6-8 in. wide (15–20 cm). This dahlia belongs to the Cactus classification and was introduced by Ernst Severin in 1963 in Germany.

Plant Profile: Height:40 in. (100 cm); Spread: 45 cm (18 in); Hardiness: Half hardy

== Dahlia 'Apache' ==
Dahlia 'Apache' is a branching, tuberous tender perennial cultivar with bright red flowers, as large as 6-8 in. wide (15–20 cm). This Dahlia belongs to the Laciniated Dahlia classification.

Plant Profile: Height:36 in. (90 cm); Spread: 45 cm (18 in); Hardiness: Half hardy

== Dahlia 'Arabian Night' ==
Dahlia 'Arabian Night' is a branching, tuberous tender perennial cultivar with deep-red flowers, almost black looking, with slightly incurved petals. The fully double flowers are as large as 4 in. wide (10 cm). This Dahlia belongs to the Decorative Dahlias classification and was introduced in the Netherlands by Weijers in 1951.

Plant Profile: Height:36-48 in. (90–120 cm); Spread: 45 cm (18 in); Hardiness: Half hardy

== Dahlia 'Babylon Bronze' ==
Dahlia 'Babylon Bronze' is a branching, tuberous tender perennial cultivar with fully double orange blossoms. The flowers are as large as 8-10 in. wide (20–25 cm). This Dahlia belongs to the Decorative Dahlia classification and was introduced in the Netherlands by Fa Van Slageren in 1995.

Plant Profile: Height:40-44 in. (100–110 cm); Spread: 45 cm (18 in); Hardiness: Half hardy

== Dahlia 'Babylon Pink' ==
Dahlia 'Babylon Pink' is a branching, tuberous tender perennial cultivar with fully double pink blossoms. The flowers are as large as 8-10 in. wide (20–25 cm). This Dahlia belongs to the Decorative Dahlia classification and was introduced in the Netherlands by Fa Van Slageren in 1994.

Plant Profile: Height:40-44 in. (100–110 cm); Spread: 45 cm (18 in); Hardiness: Half hardy

== Dahlia 'Bora Bora' ==
Dahlia 'Bora Bora' is a branching, tuberous tender perennial cultivar with coral-pink flowers blending to gold at their heart. The flowers are as large as 6-8 in. wide (15–20 cm). This Dahlia belongs to the Cactus classification and was introduced By Plochaet, H in 1997 in Belgium.

Plant Profile: Height: 36 in. (90 cm); Spread: 45 cm (18 in); Hardiness: Half hardy

== Dahlia 'Bridge View Aloha' ==
Dahlia 'Bridge View Aloha' is a branching, tuberous tender perennial cultivar with golden flowers flushed with scarlet at their tips. The fully double flowers are as large as 8 in. wide (20 cm) and enjoy elongated petals. This Dahlia belongs to the Semi-Cactus Dahlias classification and won the Award of Garden Merit of the Royal Horticultural Society in 1996.

Plant Profile: Height: 56 in. (140 cm); Spread: 45 cm (18 in); Hardiness: Half hardy

== Dahlia 'Chat Noir' ==
Dahlia 'Chat Noir' (Black Cat) is a branching, tuberous tender perennial cultivar with deep red, elongated petals. The flowers are as large as 6-8 in. wide (15–20 cm). This Dahlia belongs to the Semi Cactus Dahlia classification and was introduced in France by Ernest Turc in 1975.

Plant Profile: Height:36-48 in. (90–120 cm); Spread: 45 cm (18 in); Hardiness: Half hardy

== Dahlia 'Mrs Eileen' ==
Dahlia 'Mrs Eileen' is a branching, tuberous, tender, perennial cultivar with bright orange flowers, as large as 6-8 in. wide (15–20 cm). This dahlia belongs to the Formal Decorative Dahlia classification.

Plant Profile: Height:36-48 in. (90–120 cm); Spread: 45 cm (18 in); Hardiness: Half hardy

== See also ==
- Dahlia: Cultivation
- List of Dahlia species

=== Notable cultivars ===
- Dahlia 'Bishop of Llandaff'
- Dahlia 'Moonfire'
- List of Award of Garden Merit dahlias
