= List of Award of Garden Merit clematis =

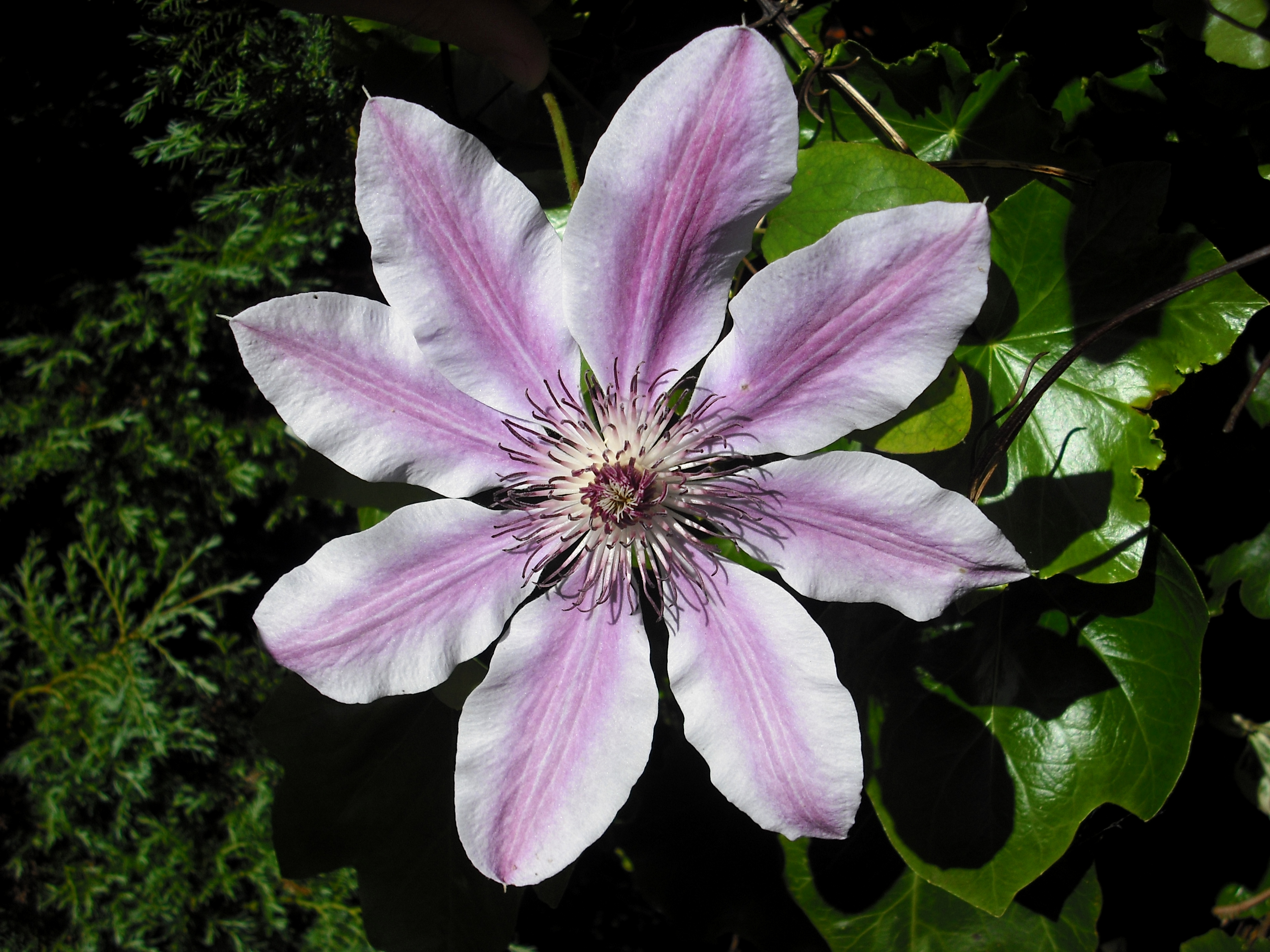
Clematis 'Nelly Moser'

Over 70 species and cultivars of clematis currently (2016) possess the Royal Horticultural Society's Award of Garden Merit, reflecting this plant's continued popularity in gardens in the United Kingdom. Clematis is a genus of woody based perennials, mostly climbers with a twining habit, though some are grown as groundcover or as herbaceous plants. They can be evergreen or deciduous. They bear flowers in all shades except black, pure blue, pure red and orange. The flowers are often large and showy. They can be single or double, fragrant or unscented, compact or vigorous, in a wide range of shapes and sizes. The flowering period varies from early spring to late summer. Many spring-flowering cultivars produce a second flush of blooms after the main display has finished, and many have attractive silky seed-heads prolonging the period of interest. Clematis can be grown against walls, fences, over pergolas and obelisks, or through other shrubs and trees.

== Groups ==
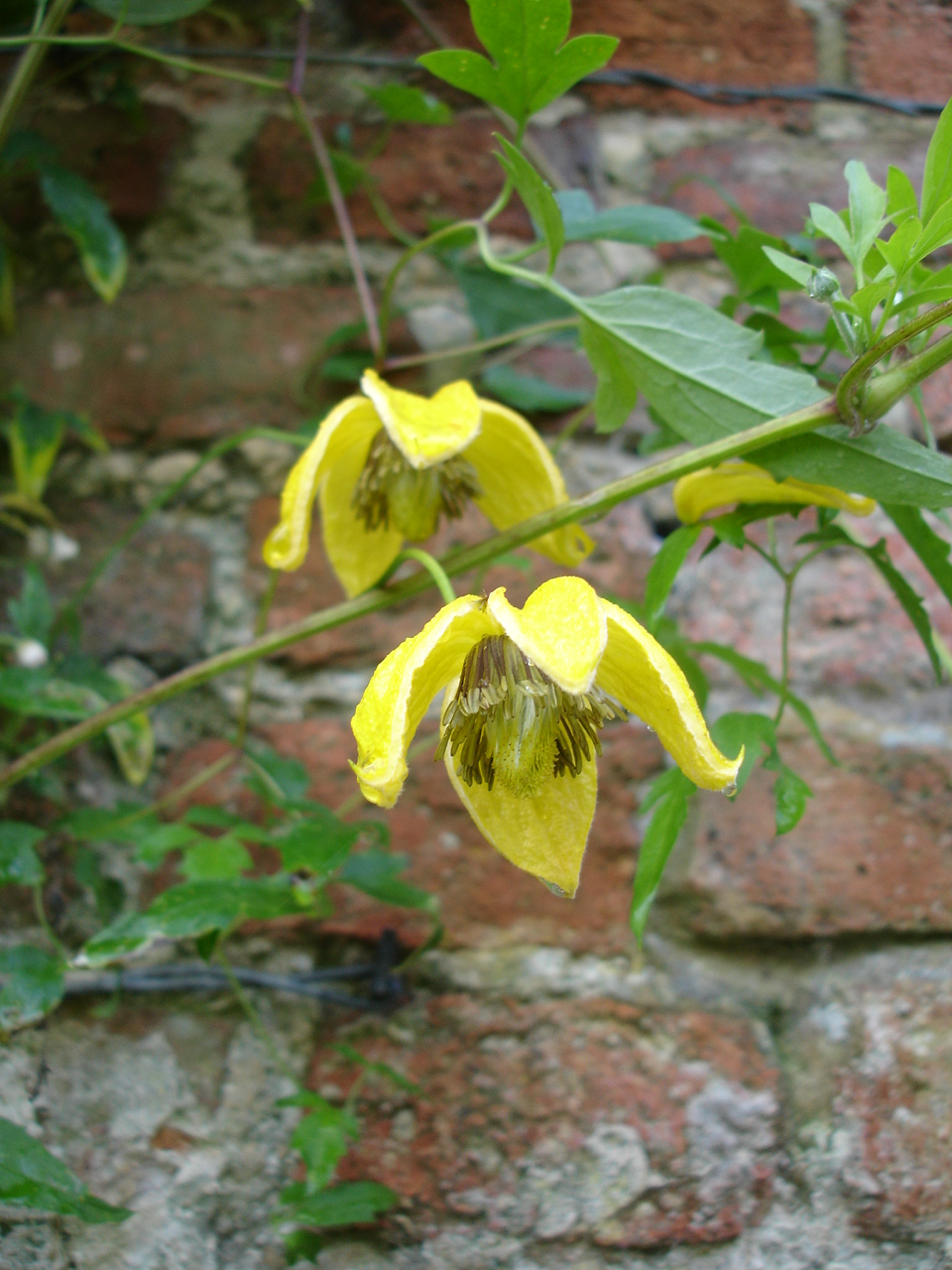
'Bill MacKenzie' (Tangutica group)

Cultivars are placed in the following groups:-

- A; Atragene group; medium-sized climbers with nodding, bellshaped flowers early in the season
- Ad; Atragene double-flowered; medium-sized climbers with nodding, bell-shaped double blooms flowering in spring on previous year's growth
- E; Early large flowered group; medium-sized climbers with large star-shaped flowers on previous season's growth, in spring and early summer, often with a second flush of blooms later in the season
- Forsteri group; dwarf or spreading evergreen shrubs or climbers, with deeply cut leaves and small white or cream flowers
- H; Heracleifolia group; subshrubs with long, scrambling stems and abundant small flowers on the current year's growth, in summer and autumn
- I; Integrifolia group; small subshrubs with herbaceous growth, flowers in summer and autumn
- L; Late large-flowered group; medium-sized climbers flowering in summer and early autumn on current year's growth, with large flowers
- M; Montana group; vigorous climbers flowering early in the season
- Md; Montana double-flowered group; vigorous climbers flowering in late spring and early summer
- T; Tangutica group; large climbers with small bell-shaped flowers, usually in shades of yellow or white, late in the season, often followed by silky seed heads
- Tx; Texensis group; climbers with bell- or tulip-shaped flowers in summer and autumn, on the current year's growth
- V; Viticella group; pinnate leaves, nodding half-open flowers on current year's growth, in summer
- Va; Vitalba group; substantial climbers with profuse, small, erect flowers on current year's growth, in summer and autumn; also used for groundcover

Name	Species	Group	Colour	Dia.	H	W	Image
Abundance		V	red (wine)	7.5	4.0	1.0	
Alionushka		I	pink (rose)	5.0	1.5	0.5	
Anna Louise 'Evithree'		E	purple/cerise	15.0	4.0	0.5	
Apple Blossom		Ar	white	6.5	8.0	2.5	
Arabella		I	blue (mauve)	9.0	2.5	1.0	
Arctic Queen 'Evitwo'		E	white	15.0	4.0	1.0	
Ballet Skirt		A/d	pink	10.0	2.5	1.0	
Bill MacKenzie		T	yellow	7.0	8.0	4.0	
Blekitny Aniol		L	blue (pale)	10.0	2.5	1.0	
Broughton Star		MD	pink (deep)	6.0	8.0	5.4	
Cassandra	C. heracleifolia		blue		1.0	0.5	
	C. montana var. grandiflora	M	white	7.0	12.0	4.0	
	C. rehderiana		yellow (pale)	2.5	8.0	2.5	
	C. × durandii		blue (indigo)	10.0	2.5	1.0	
Comtesse de Bouchaud		L	pink (rose)	15.0	2.5	1.0	
Constance		A	pink (deep)	5.0	2.5	1.5	
Daniel Deronda		E	blue (violet)	20.0	2.5	1.0	
Elizabeth		M	pink (pale)	6.0	12.0	4.0	
Ernest Markham		L	red (crimson)	15.0	4.0	1.0	
Étoile violette		V	purple	10.0	4.0	1.5	
Foxy		A	pink (pale)	5.0	2.5	1.5	
Frances Rivis		A	blue (violet) / cream	5.0	2.5	1.5	
Frankie		A	blue (violet) / cream	5.0	2.5	1.5	
Freckles	C. cirrhosa var. purpurascens		yellow (pale)/maroon	5.0	4.0	1.0	
Freda		M	pink (deep)	5.0	8.0	4.0	
Fujimusume		E	blue (pale)	20.0	1.5	1.0	
Gillian Blades		L	white	15.0	2.5	1.0	
Gipsy Queen		L	purple	14.0	4.0	1.0	
Golden Tiara 'Kugotia'		T	yellow	4.0	8.0	8.0	
Hågelby Pink'		Vt	pink (pale)		4.0	1.0	
Happy Birthday 'Zohapbi'		L	purple	10.0	3.0	1.5	
Helsingborg		A	purple	5.0	2.5	1.5	
Huldine		L	white	10.0	4.0	2.5	
Jackmanii		L	purple	10.0	4.0	1.0	
Jacqueline du Pré		L	pink (rose)	6.3	2.5	1.5	
Joe	C. × cartmanii	F	white	4.0	1.5	0.5	
Ken Donson		E	blue (deep)		3.0	0.5	
Kermesina		V	red (crimson)	6.0	4.0	1.5	
Lagoon	C. macropetala	A	blue (violet)	7.5	2.5	1.5	
Lambton Park		T	yellow	7.0	8.0	4.0	
Lasurstern		E	blue (lavender)	7.5	2.5	1.0	
Madame Julia Correvon		V	red (claret)	12.5	4.0	1.5	
Marie Boisselot		E	white	20.0	4.0	1.0	
Markham's Pink		AD	pink	5.0	4.0	1.5	
Mayleen		M	pink (pale)	7.0	12.0	2.5	
Minuet		V	white/pink	5.0	4.0	1.0	
Mrs Cholmondeley		E	blue (lavender)	20.0	2.5	1.0	
Mrs George Jackman		E	white	18.0	2.5	1.0	
Nelly Moser		E	pink	20.0	2.5	1.0	
Niobe		E	red (ruby)	15.0	2.5	1.0	
Pamela Jackman	C. alpina	A	blue (deep)	7.0	2.5	1.5	
Pangbourne Pink		I	pink (mauve)	5.0	1.0	0.5	
Paul Farges		Va	white	4.5	8.0	2.5	
Pauline		Ad	blue		2.5	1.5	
Petit Faucon 'Evisix'		I	blue (violet)	9.0	1.0	1.0	
Pink Flamingo		A	pink (pale)	4.0	2.5	1.5	
Poldice		V	violet/white		4.0	1.5	
Polish Spirit		L	purple	9.0	4.0	1.0	
Praecox		H	blue (pale)	2.0	4.0	2.5	
Prince Charles		L	blue (violet)	10.0	2.5	1.0	
Princess Diana		Tx	red (magenta)	10.0	4.0	1.0	
Purpurea Plena Elegans		VD	purple/pink	5.0	2.5	1.0	
Remembrance		LL	pink (deep)	12.0	2.5	1.5	
Richard Pennell		E	purple	20.0	2.5	1.0	
Roko-Kolla		LL	white	15.0	2.5	1.0	
Sunset		E	red (magenta)	12.0	2.5	1.0	
Tetrarose	C. montana var. rubens	M	pink (mauve)	7.5	8.0	2.5	
The President		E	blue	18.0	2.5	1.0	
Venosa Violacea		V	purple/white	10.0	2.5	1.0	
Walenburg		V	purple/white		3.0	1.0	
Warszawska Nike		EL	purple	18.0	2.5	1.0	
Wesselton	C. macropetala	E	blue (pale)		2.5	1.5	
White Columbine		A	white	5.0	2.5	1.5	
Will Goodwin		EL	pale violet	15.0	2.5	1.0	
Wisley Cream	C. cirrhosa		yellow (pale)	8.0	4.0	1.0	
Wisley 'Evipo001'		Vt	blue/red	13.0	4.0	1.5	
