= List of Award of Garden Merit dianthus =

Below is a list of Dianthus species and cultivars which have gained the Royal Horticultural Society's Award of Garden Merit. This is an important group of more-or-less fragrant summer-flowering perennial garden plants, which can be divided into three main groups:-

- Carnations (D. caryophyllus)
- Pinks (D. plumarius)
- Sweet Williams (D. barbatus)

Carnations can be further divided into hardy border types, which grow outside, and perpetual flowering types which are usually grown under glass to provide cut flowers and buttonholes all year round.

The list does not currently include any sweet william cultivars.

name	type	colour	fragrance	Height (cm)	ref
Alfriston	border carnation	red (coral)	strong	50	
Anders Kath Phillips	perpetual carnation	cream/purple		100	
Ann Franklin	perpetual carnation	yellow		90	
Becky Robinson	pink	pink (pale)/red	medium	40	
Betty Morton	pink	pink (deep)/maroon	medium	50	
Brian Tumbler	border carnation	yellow (pale) edged red		75	
Brilliant Star	pink	white/dark red	medium	50	
Bryony Lisa	border carnation	white/dark red		50	
Carmine Letitia Wyatt	pink	pink (salmon)	slight	30	
Chesswood Barbara Arif	border carnation	white edged purple		70	
Chesswood Lidgett	border carnation	white edged dark red		70	
Chesswood Margaret Alison	border carnation	rose/pink	strong	100	
Chris Crew	border carnation	yellow/red		50	
Claret Joy	pink	pink (deep)		50	
Coronation Ruby	pink	pink/maroon	medium	45	
Cranmere Pool	pink	white/maroon	slight	35	
Dainty Dame	pink	white/maroon	strong	25	
David Russell	border carnation	white/crimson	medium	50	
David Saunders	border carnation	white/red	medium	50	
Devon Dove	pink	white	medium	45	
Devon Flavia	pink	pink (pale)	strong	35	
Devon Wizard	pink	pink (deep)	strong	25	
Diane	pink	pink (salmon)	medium	30	
Dianthus alpinus		pink (cerise)		10	
Dianthus deltoides		pink (cerise)		20	
Dianthus gratianopolitanus		pink (rose)	strong	15	
Doris	pink	pink (pale)	medium	40	
Eileen Neal	border carnation	red	strong	50	
Eileen O'Connor	border carnation	orange	slight	30	
Evening Star	pink	pink/maroon	medium	10	
Flanders	border carnation	scarlet		50	
Golden Cross	border carnation	yellow (pale)	none	50	
Gran's Favourite	pink	white/pink	medium	50	
Grey Dove	border carnation	grey/pink	medium	50	
Hannah Louise	border carnation	yellow/orange	none	50	
Haytor Rock	pink	white/crimson		30	
Haytor White	pink	white	medium	40	
Hazel Ruth	border carnation	white/red		50	
Houndspool Cheryl	pink	scarlet	none	30	
Houndspool Ruby	pink	rose pink (deep)	medium	50	
Incas	perpetual carnation	cream/red	medium	100	
India Star	pink	pink/red	medium	10	
Inshriach Dazzler	pink	pink/grey	medium	10	
Irene Della-Torré	border carnation	white/pink	medium	75	
Jean Knight	border carnation	white/purple		50	
Joan's Blood (Dianthus alpinus)	alpine	pink (deep)		10	
John Sandall	border carnation	white/red		60	
Joy	pink	pink		35	
Kathleen Hitchcock	border carnation	pink (coral)	slight	50	
Kesteven Kirkstead	pink	white/maroon	medium	30	
Kristina	perpetual	pink (pale) edged purple	slight	100	
La Bourboule	pink	pink (rose)	medium	10	
Lady Madonna='Wp04 Idare'	pink	white/purple	strong	35	
Letitia Wyatt	pink	pink	medium	25	
Lily the Pink='Wp05 Idare'	pink	pink (deep)	strong	50	
Linfield Dorothy Perry	pink	white	slight	30	
Linfield Kathy Booker	pink	white/maroon edged pink	strong	50	
Maisie Neal	border carnation	pink (salmon)		50	
Mambo	perpetual carnation	yellow (pale)		150	
Maureen Lambert	perpetual carnation	red	strong	100	
Michael Saunders	border Carnation	pink/purple		50	
Milky Way	perpetual	white		100	
Monica Wyatt	pink	pink (pale)/maroon	strong	30	
Moulin Rouge	pink	pink/red		30	
Natalie Saunders	border carnation	white/purple	slight	50	
Neon Star	pink	purple/pink	medium	50	
Nichola Ann	border carnation	white	slight	50	
Night Star	pink	maroon/pink		30	
Peter Wood	border carnation	pink/red		50	
Pike's Pink	pink	pink (pale)	medium	15	
Pixie Star	pink	pink/red		20	
Prado Mint	perpetual	yellow/green		100	
Red Star	pink	pink (deep)		10	
Romance='Wp09 Wen04'	pink	salmon	strong	35	
Rose Joy	pink	pink (cerise)	medium	50	
Rose Monica Wyatt	pink	pink (rose)	strong	60	
Sandra Neal	border carnation	yellow (apricot)/pink		50	
Slap 'n' Tickle='Wp05 Pp22'	pink	rose	medium	21	
Spinfield Joy	border carnation	cream/purple		65	
Tamsin Fifield	border carnation	white/red		50	
Tickled Pink='Devon Pp11'	pink	pink (lavender)	strong	30	
Uncle Teddy	border carnation	white/maroon	slight	45	
Valda Wyatt	pink	pink (rose)	medium	35	
Viana='Kovian'	perpetual	cream/dark red		100	
Whatfield Cancan	pink	pink	medium	20	
Whatfield Magenta	pink	pink (magenta)	slight	20	
White Joy	pink	white/pale pink	medium	55	
Widecombe Fair	pink	pink (pale)	medium	50	
