= List of Award of Garden Merit dahlias =

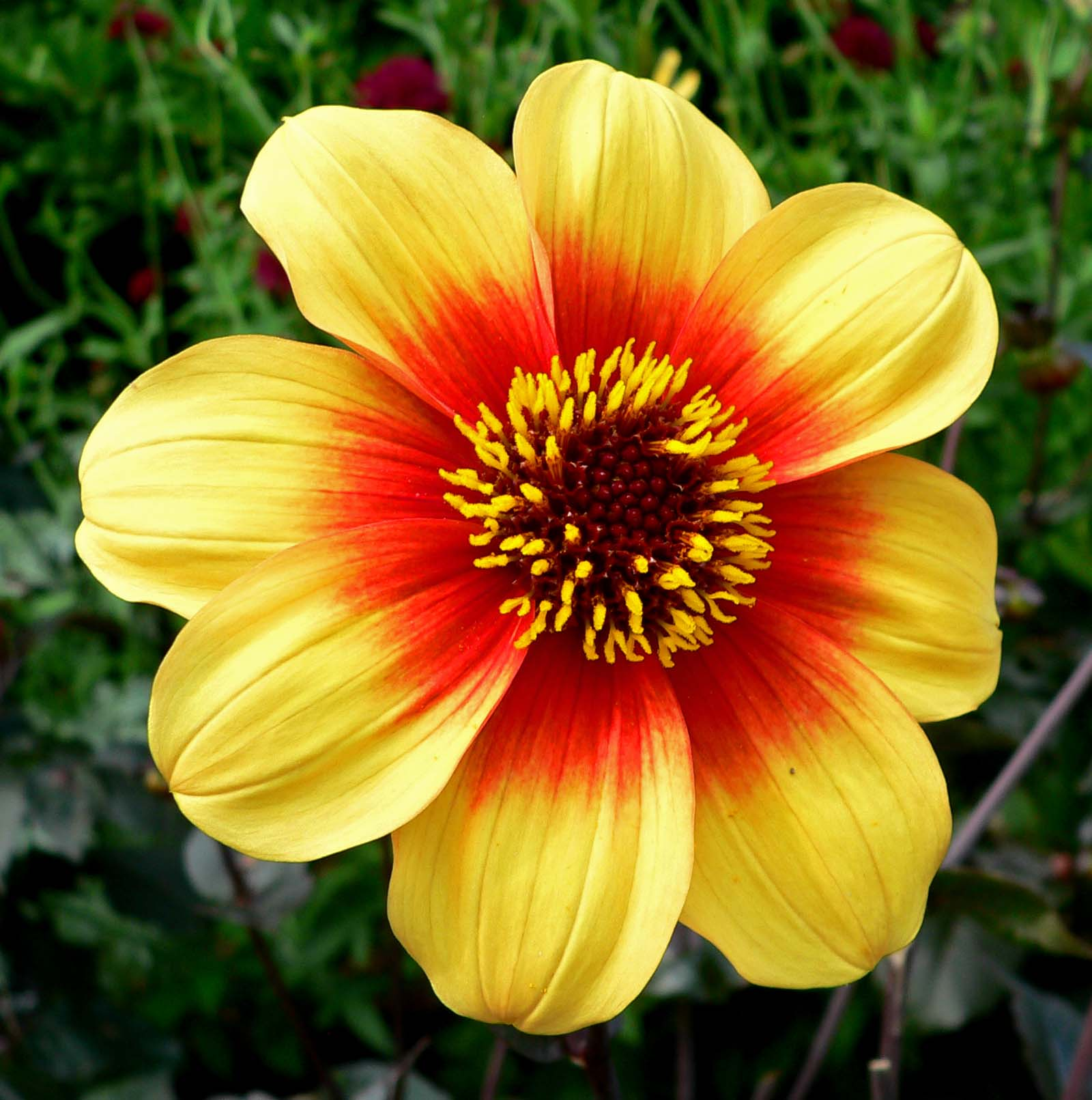
'Moonfire' (VanDusen Botanical Garden, Stan Shebs)

The following is a list of dahlia cultivars which have gained the Royal Horticultural Society's Award of Garden Merit. They are tuberous perennials, originally from South America, with showy daisy-like composite flowerheads in all shades and combinations of white, yellow, orange, pink and red, flowering in late summer and autumn (fall). Much work has been done on the development of a range of flower shapes and sizes. They may be sold as dry tubers in Spring, and started off in heat before being planted out after all danger of frost has passed. Alternatively they can be purchased later in the season, in pots ready to flower. Dwarf bedding types are usually cultivated as annuals and discarded after flowering. In mild areas without penetrating frosts, mature plants can be overwintered in the garden; otherwise, they are lifted and stored in a frost free place. They are easily propagated from cuttings in Spring.

Flower shapes can be divided into 14 main groups:-

1. single: less than 10 cm (4 in) - open centred, with a single or double row of ray florets
2. waterlily: miniature, small or medium sized blooms - double, with a small number of flattened, rounded ray florets
3. collerette: 10–15 cm (4–6 in) - single row of flat ray florets surrounding an inner collar of shorter florets and a central disc
4. anemone-flowered: 10–15 cm (4–6 in) - upward-pointing, tubular florets, surrounded by one or more rows of flattened ray florets
5. pompon: 10 cm (4 in) - tightly spherical small blooms with florets in a scale-like arrangement
6. ball: similar to pompon but larger in size
7. semi-cactus: double flowers in a range of sizes; many pointed, recurved ray florets
8. cactus: double flowers in a range of sizes; many pointed, recurved ray florets that are narrower than semi-cactus flowers
9. decorative: fully double flowers with the central disc completely hidden; the broad florets may be pointed and twisted
10. miscellaneous: including peony-flowered, orchid-flowered, chrysanthemum-flowered, dwarf bedding

As of 2015, 124 cultivars are listed. Maximum dimensions of plants are shown in centimetres.

Name	Type	Colour	Height (cm)	Spread (cm)	Ref
Allan Sparkes	waterlily	pink	150	100	
Almand's Climax	decorative	pink	100	100	
Alva's Doris	semi-cactus	red	120	60	
Alva's Supreme	decorative	yellow (pale)	120	60	
Ann Breckenfelder	collerette	red/yellow	170	100	
April Heather	collerette	yellow/pink	125	50	
Asahi Chohje	anemone	red/white	150	100	
Bednall Beauty	dwarf bedding	red	50	50	
Bishop of Llandaff	peony	red	110	45	
Blyton Softer Gleam	decorative	yellow/orange	135	100	
Bridge View Aloha	semi-cactus	yellow/red	150	100	
Brookfield Delight	single	orange	50	50	
Charlie Dimmock	waterlily	orange/yellow	185	150	
Chat Noir	semi-cactus	red/purple	170	100	
Clair de Lune	collerette	cream	110	60	
Cream Alva's	decorative	cream	150	100	
David Howard	decorative	yellow (bronze)	100	50	
Don Hill	collerette	red/yellow	150	100	
Dovegrove	single	red	100	50	
Edwin's Sunset	waterlily	red	120	50	
Ellen Huston	dwarf bedding	orange (scarlet)	50	50	
Exotic Dwarf	single lilliput	pink/purple/yellow	40	40	
Fascination	peony	pink	60	45	
Figurine	waterlily	pink (pale)	100	50	
Finchcocks	waterlily	orange	120	60	
Freya's Paso Doble	anemone	white/yellow	110	60	
Fusion	decorative	white/pale pink	100	50	
Gallery Art Deco	decorative	orange/red	100	50	
Gallery Art Fair	decorative	white	50	50	
Gallery Art Nouveau	decorative	pink (raspberry)	100	50	
Gallery La Tour	decorative	pink	50	50	
Gallery Leonardo	decorative	pink	50	50	
Gallery Pablo	decorative	pink/yellow	50	50	
Gallery Rembrandt	decorative	pink (bright)	100	50	
Gallery Renoir	decorative	pink (rose)	50	50	
Gallery Vincent	decorative	yellow/orange	50	50	
Geoffrey Kent	decorative	red	100	50	
Glorie van Heemstede	decorative	yellow	130	60	
Grenadier	decorative	red	100	100	
Hamari Accord	semi-cactus	yellow (pale)	120	60	
Hamari Bride	semi-cactus	white	120	60	
Hamari Gold	decorative	yellow	120	60	
Hamari Rosé	ball	pink/yellow	120	60	
Hamilton Lillian	decorative	orange	120	60	
Happy Days Purple='Hdpu165'	single	purple	40	40	
Happy Single Flame	single	red/yellow	80	50	
Happy Single Princess	single	pink/white	80	50	
Happy Single Wink	single	purple-pink/red	60	50	
Harvest Samantha	single lilliput	pink (deep)	70	50	
Hillcrest Candy	semi-cactus	pink/white	150	50	
Hillcrest Desire	cactus	orange	120	60	
Hillcrest Regal	collerette	red (deep)	120	60	
Hillcrest Royal	cactus	purple	120	60	
Honka	single orchid	yellow	100	50	
Jodie Wilkinson	ball	peach/lemon	120	50	
Jomanda	ball	orange	110	60	
Josie Gott	ball	white/purple	100	50	
Karenglen	decorative	orange	110	60	
Kenora Sunset	semi-cactus	yellow/orange	120	60	
Kenora Valentine	decorative	red	120	60	
Kidd's Climax	decorative	red	110	60	
Kilburn Rose	waterlily	pink/peach	100	50	
Knockout	single	yellow/orange	100	100	
Lakeland Sunset	cactus	yellow	100	100	
Le Castel	waterlily	white	100	100	
Lemon Elegans	semi-cactus	yellow (lemon)	130	100	
Lilac Marston	decorative	lila/purple	150	100	
Lilac Taratahi	cactus	pink	150	100	
Lismore Willie	waterlily	yellow (bronze)	120	60	
Magenta Star	single	pink (magenta)	130	100	
Maiko Girl	double orchid	pink	100	50	
Marie Schnugg	single orchid	red/yellow	50	50	
Mary's Jomanda	ball	pink/purple	150	100	
Mayan Pearl	double orchid	pink	65	50	
Melody Harmony	decorative	pink/white	80	50	
Moonfire	dwarf bedding	yellow/red	75	45	
My-nute Blend	misc	orange/yellow	50	50	
Oakwood Naranga	decorative	orange	100	50	
Ocean Bird	decorative	pink	100	50	
Omo	single lily	white/yellow	40	40	
Otto's Thrill	decorative	pink (soft)	110	50	
Pearl of Heemstede	decorative	pink (silvery)	100	45	
Pink Giraffe	double orchid	pink	135	50	
Pink Pastelle	semi-cactus	pink	120	60	
Pooh - Swan Island	collerette	orange/yellow	100	50	
Preston Park	dwarf bedding	red (scarlet)	45	45	
Pretty Woman='Vdtg43'	single	pink/purple	40	40	
Rhonda Suzanne	pompon	purple (pale)	150	50	
Ruby Murray	decorative	pink (deep)	75	50	
Ryecroft Jan	ball	white	165	100	
Ryecroft Marge	anemone	pink/yellow	150	100	
Shep's Memory	waterlily	peach	180	100	
Small World	pompon	white	110	60	
So Dainty	semi-cactus	orange (pale)	110	60	
Tally Ho	miscellaneous	orange (pale)	60	45	
Taratahi Ruby	waterlily	red	150	100	
Trelyn Crimson	collerette	red	120	50	
Trelyn Daisy	collerette	white/yellow	140	140	
Trelyn Kiwi	semi-cactus	pink/white	100	50	
Trelyn Rhiannon	cactus	pink/yellow	180	100	
Twyning's After Eight	single	white	100	100	
Twyning's Revel	single	pink (deep)	120	100	
Waltzing Mathilda	misc.	orange/pink	70	50	
Westerton Folly	ball	pink (deep)	120	50	
Weston Pirate	cactus	red (ruby)	150	100	
Weston Spanish Dancer	cactus	yellow/red	150	100	
Weston Stardust	cactus	pink/yellow	100	50	
White Alva's	decorative	white	120	60	
White Ballet	decorative	white	90	60	
Witteman's Superba	semi-cactus	red (crimson)	150	100	
Wootton Cupid	ball	pink/yellow	110	60	
Wootton Impact	semi-cactus	yellow (bronze)	110	60	
Yellow Hammer	dwarf bedding	yellow (pale)	60	45	
Zorro	decorative	red (crimson)	120	60	

== Sources ==
- RHS (2015). "Royal Horticultural Society".
  - Dahlia
