= Dahlia 'Moonfire' =

Dahlia cultivar

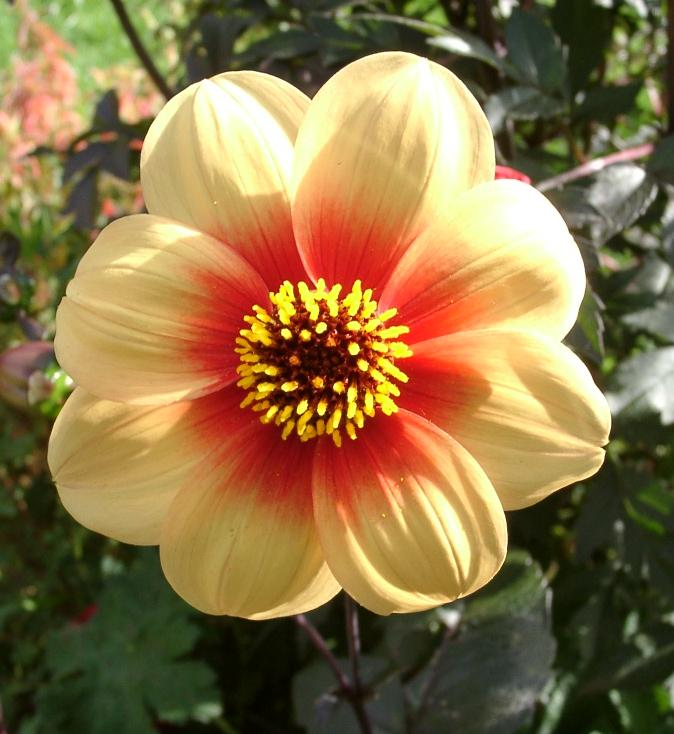
- Species: Dahlia ×hortensis
- Hybrid parentage: D. coccinea × D. pinnata
- Cultivar: 'Moonfire'

Dahlia 'Moonfire' is a Dahlia cultivar with very dark, almost black leaves like Dahlia 'Bishop of Llandaff'. It is classified as Group 10 Miscellaneous. The orange-yellow flower heads are 80 mm wide and sit on stems of up to 85 cm height.

The cultivar was originally developed in The Netherlands, but mistakenly supplied to Bridgmere Nurseries (UK) as an unnamed seedling, where it was named by Chris Sanders. It turned out that the cultivar was grown on Dutch trial grounds under the name 'Sunshine'. As the International Dahlia Register has three inadequately described cultivars labelled 'Sunshine', it was not possible to connect 'Moonfire' with one of these cultivars.

== Bibliography ==
- RHS (2015). "Royal Horticultural Society".
