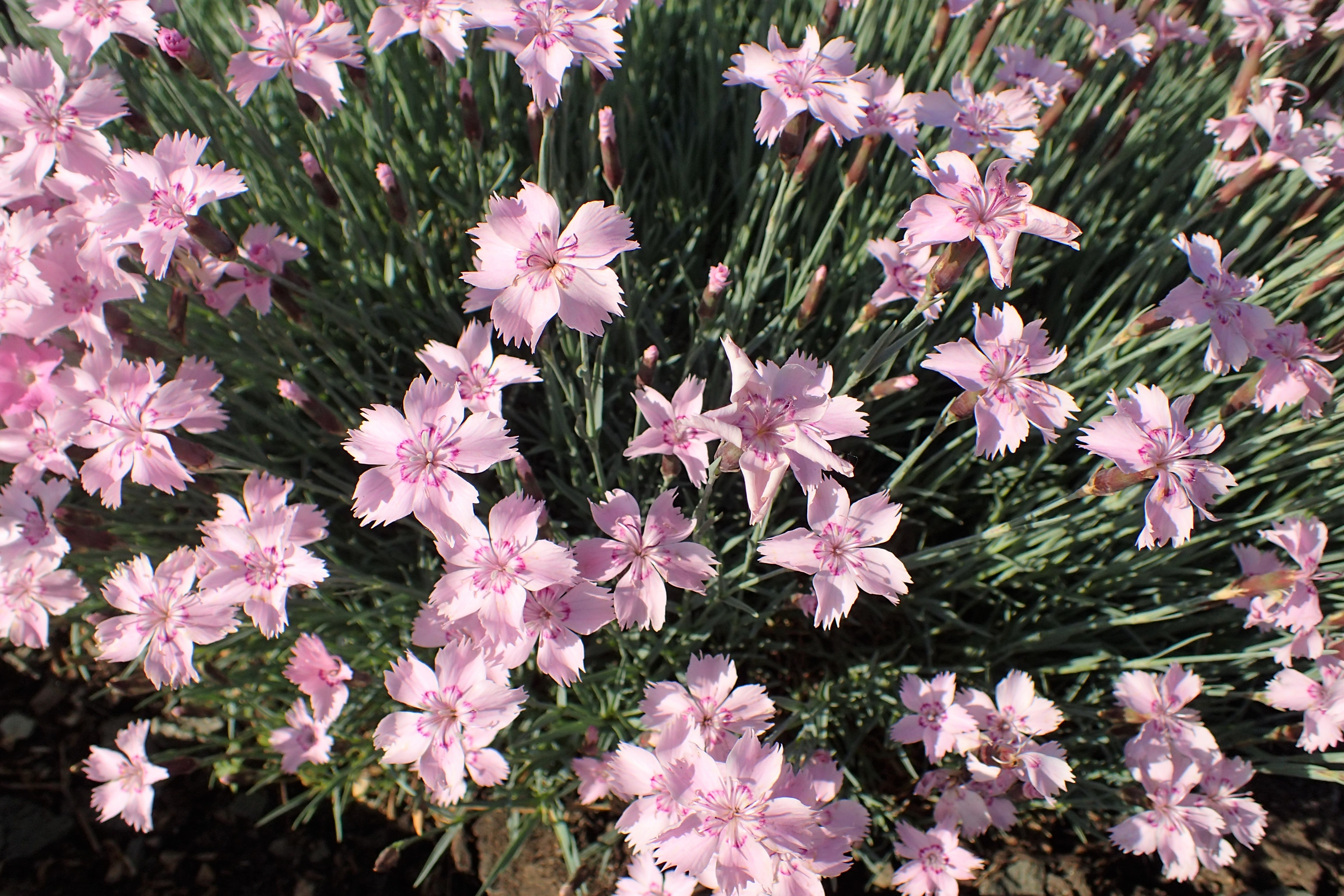
- Dianthus plumarius, garden pink

Scientific classification
- Kingdom: Plantae
- Clade: Tracheophytes
- Clade: Angiosperms
- Clade: Eudicots
- Order: Caryophyllales
- Family: Caryophyllaceae
- Genus: Dianthus
- Species: D. plumarius

Binomial name
- Dianthus plumarius L.

= Dianthus plumarius =

Species of plant

Dianthus plumarius – also called the common pink, garden pink, wild pink, or simply pink – is a species of flowering plant in the family Caryophyllaceae.

== Description ==
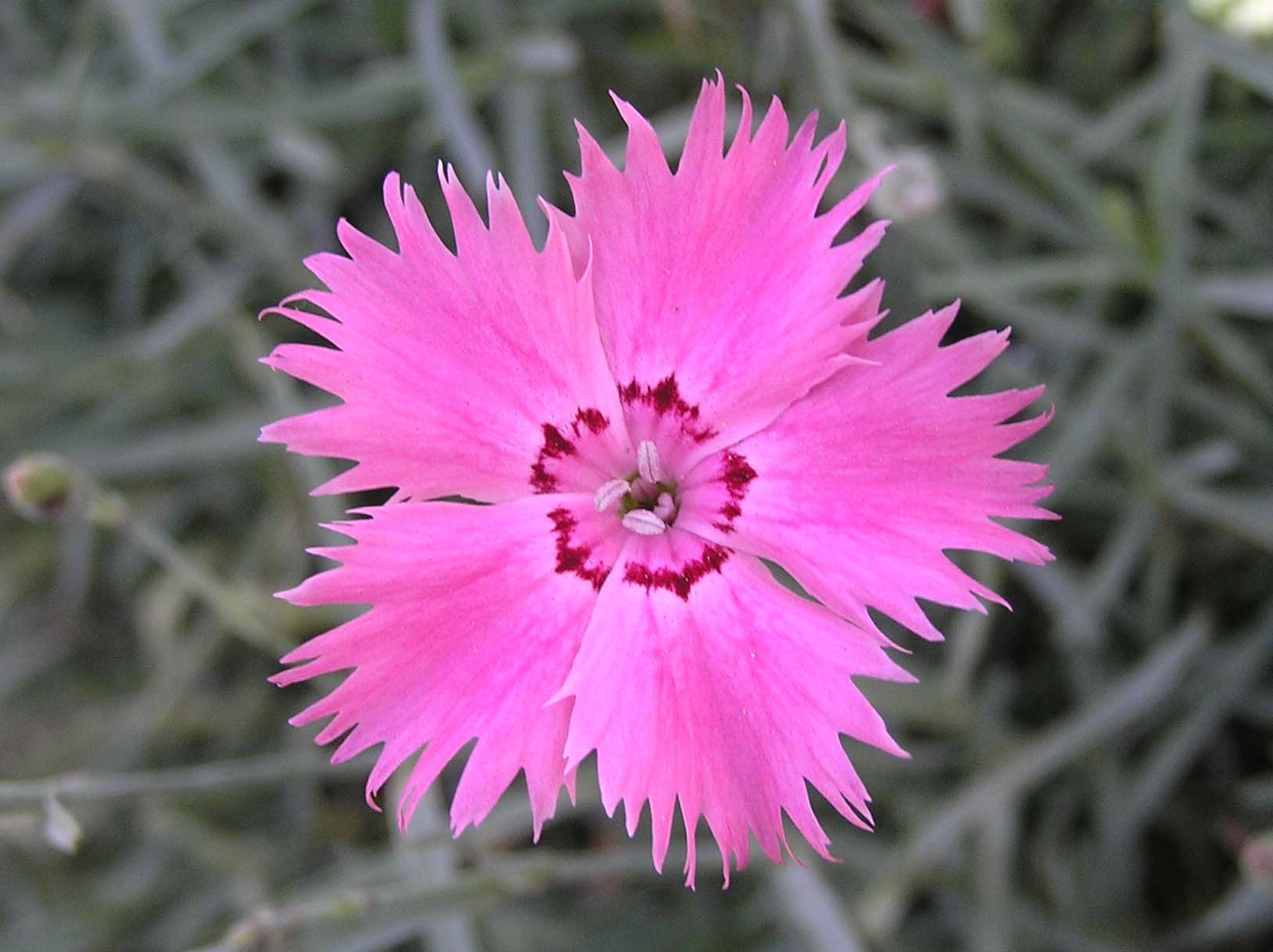
Close up of flower

Dianthus plumarius is a compact evergreen perennial reaching on average 30–60 centimetres (12–24 in) in height. The stem is green, erect, glabrous and branched on the top. The leaves are opposite, simple, linear and sessile, more or less erect and flexuous, with a sheath embracing the stem. They are about 3 millimetres (0.12 in) wide and about 10 centimetres (3.9 in) long. The calyx is a green cylindrical tube about 2 centimetres (0.79 in) long, with reddish teeth. The flowers are radially symmetric, hermaphrodite, gathered in scapes of 3–5 flowers, with 10 stamens. They have five pink petals, 10–15 millimetres (0.39–0.59 in) long, with fringed margins. The flowering period extends from May through August. The fruits are capsules with a few seeds.

== Distribution ==
Flower atlas print from 1884

This species is native to Austria, Croatia, and Slovenia, and naturalized in Italy, Germany, and the United Kingdom.

In the United States it is known to grow invasively in Alabama, South Carolina, North Carolina, Virginia, Pennsylvania, Indiana, Illinois, Missouri, Wisconsin, Michigan, New York State, New Hampshire, Vermont, Maine, and California.

== Etymology ==
While the origin of the name "pink" is uncertain, within two decades of its 1570 appearance in the written record, that flower's name was being used to refer to the pastel red known as pink in English today. Whether the pinking shear shares a common origin, or is named after the flower, is uncertain.

== See also ==
- List of Award of Garden Merit dianthus
