= Dahlia 'Bishop of Llandaff' =

Dahlia cultivar

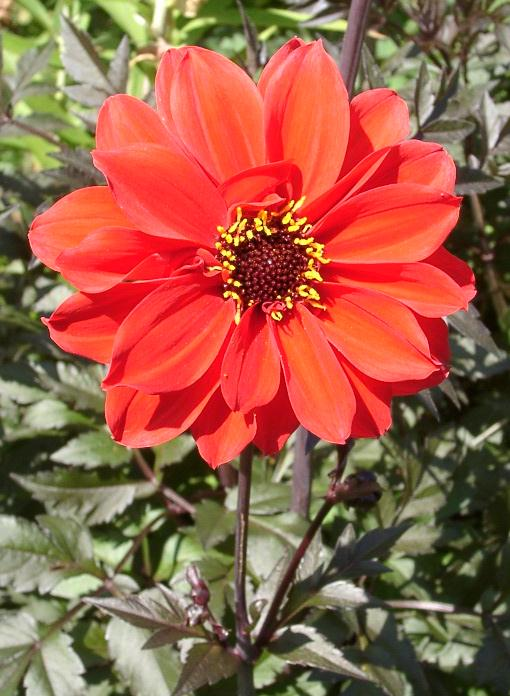
- Species: Dahlia ×hortensis
- Hybrid parentage: D. coccinea × D. pinnata
- Cultivar: 'Bishop of Llandaff'

'Bishop of Llandaff' is a cultivar of the dahlia, a garden plant. It is a branching, tuberous tender perennial with dark purple, almost black, foliage. This produces a stunning contrast with its scarlet flowers. The plant was first bred by Fred Treseder, a Cardiff nurseryman. It was selected by and named to honour Joshua Pritchard Hughes, Bishop of Llandaff, in 1924 and won the RHS Award of Garden Merit in 1928. The plant is about 1 m tall and flowers from June until September. As with all dahlias, frost blackens its foliage, and in areas prone to frost its tubers need to be overwintered in a dry, frost-free place. The variety became very popular in the 1990s.

The simpler form (single or semi-double) of the flower makes the nectar and pollen more accessible to pollinating insects.

A seed strain has been produced from this plant called 'Bishops Children', they retain the dark foliage colour but produce a mix of flower colours and flower shapes from single to semi-double flowers in different sizes.

Plant Profile:

- Height: 1.1 m (3 1/2 ft)
- Spread: 45 cm (18 in)
- Site: full sun
- Soil: fertile, free-draining
- Hardiness: half-hardy

Also comes in rich reds and purples, yellows and oranges, as well as paler shades
