= Pinking shears =

Scissors that produce a zigzag pattern

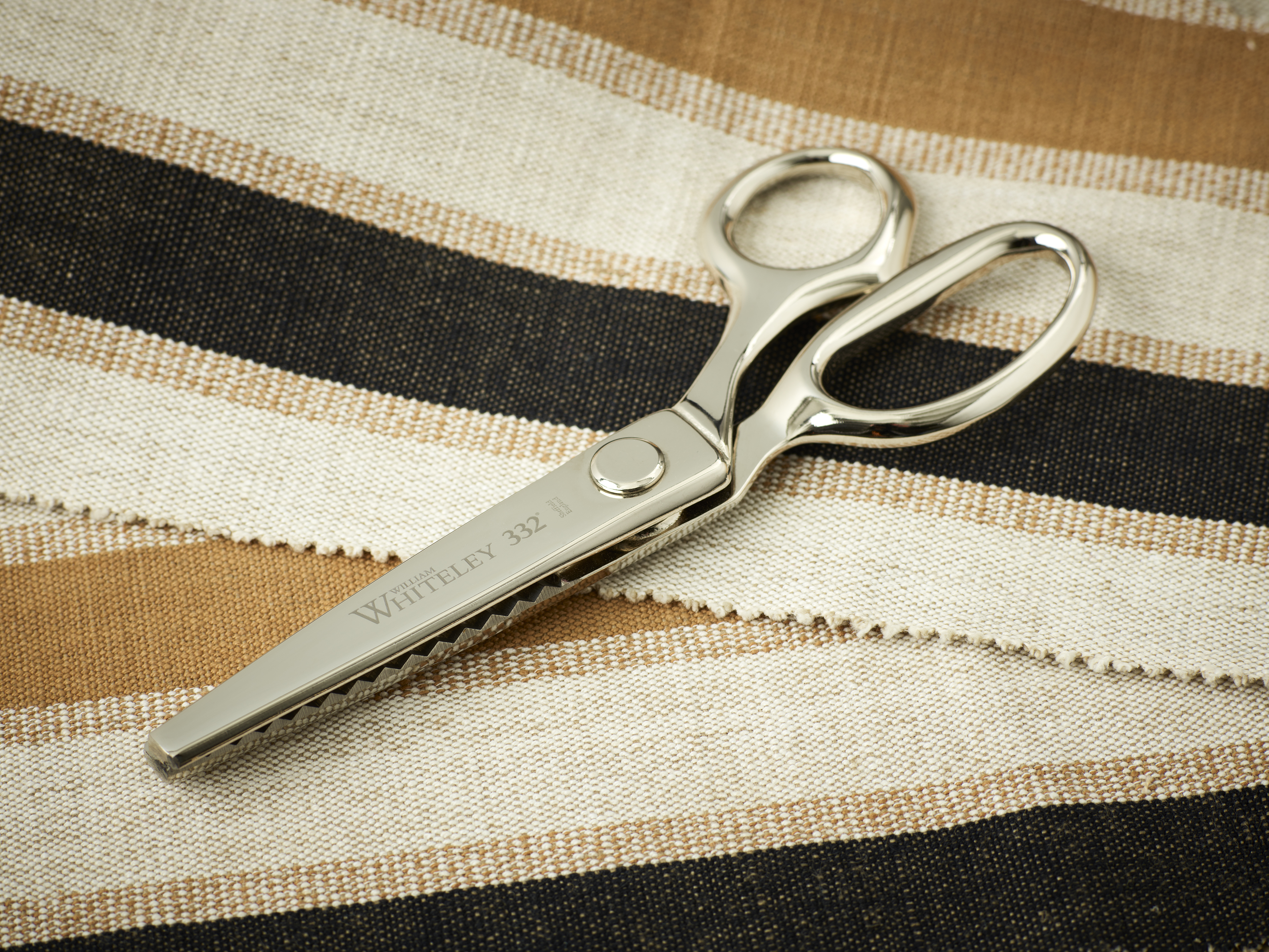
A pair of pinking shears with fabric underneath, which has been pinked along the edges.

Pinking shears are scissors with saw-toothed blades instead of straight blades. They produce a zigzag pattern instead of a straight edge.

Before pinking scissors were invented, a pinking punch or pinking iron was used to punch out a decorative hem on a garment. The punch would be hammered by a mallet against a hard surface, and the punch would cut through the fabric. In 1874, Eliza P. Welch patented an improved pinking iron design, featuring a pair of handles.

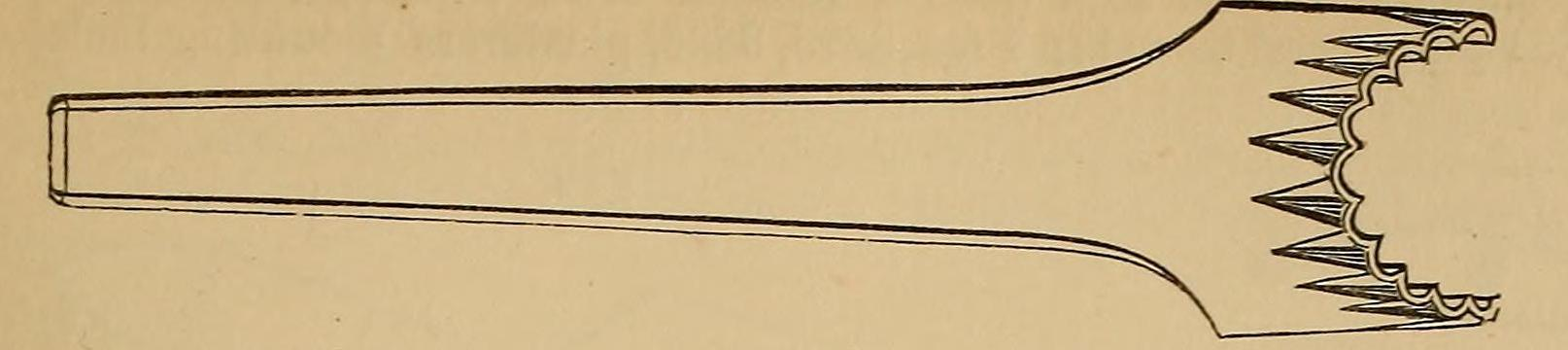
Illustration of a pinking iron

The pinking shears design that is the most well-known was patented by Louise Austin in 1893. In 1934, Samuel Briskman patented a pinking shear design (Felix Wyner and Edward Schulz are listed as the inventors). In 1952, Benjamin Luscalzo was granted a patent for pinking shears to keep the blades aligned to prevent wear.

Pinking shears are used for cutting woven cloth. Unfinished cloth edges will easily fray, the weave becoming undone, and threads pulling out easily. The sawtooth pattern does not prevent the fraying but limits the length of the frayed thread and thus minimizes damage.

These scissors can also be used for decorative cuts, and several patterns (arches, sawtooth of different aspect ratios, or asymmetric teeth) are available.

== Etymology ==
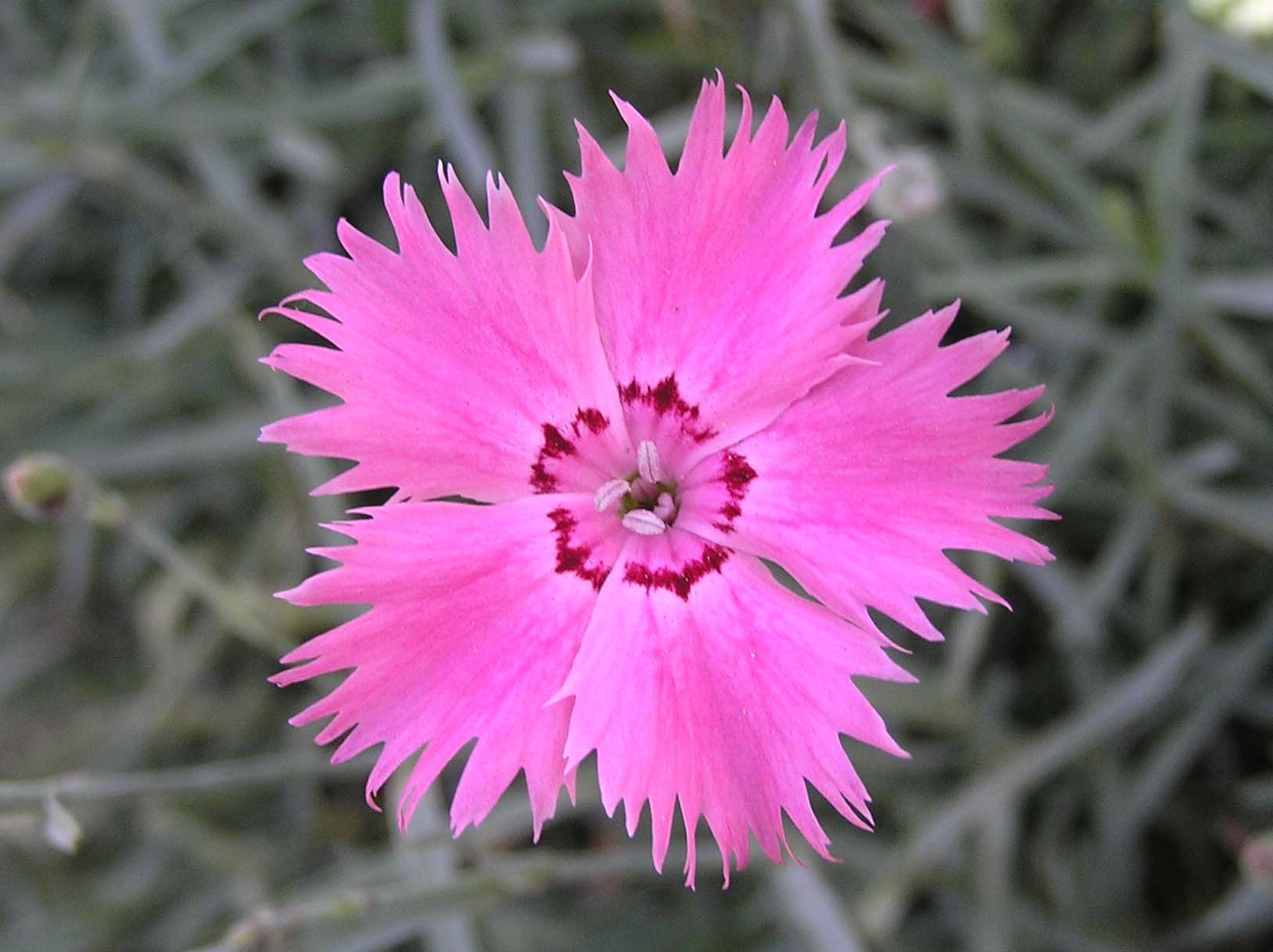
Garden pink flower

The cut produced by pinking shears may have been derived from the pink garden plant, in the genus Dianthus (the carnations).
