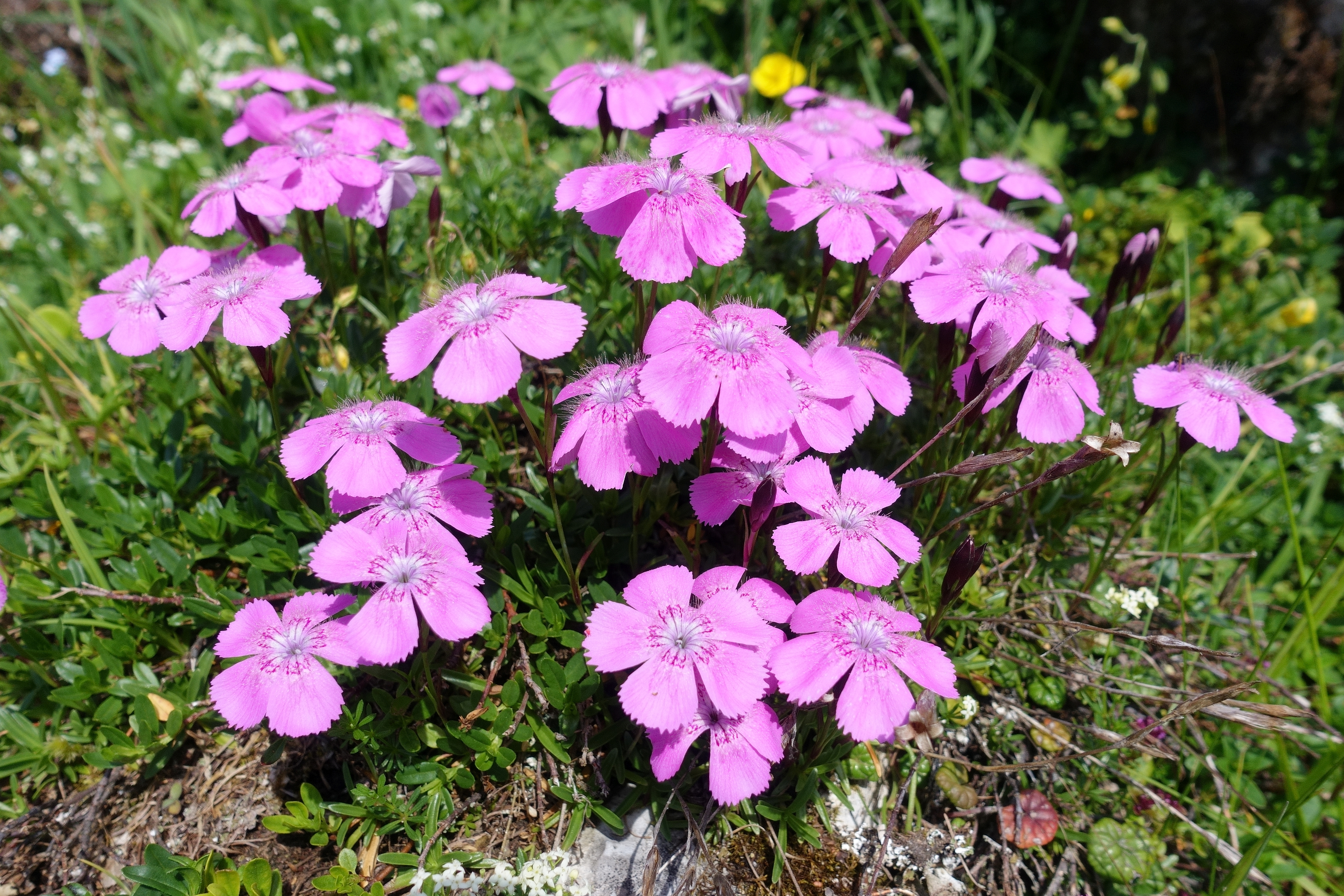

Scientific classification
- Kingdom: Plantae
- Clade: Tracheophytes
- Clade: Angiosperms
- Clade: Eudicots
- Order: Caryophyllales
- Family: Caryophyllaceae
- Genus: Dianthus
- Species: D. alpinus

Binomial name
- Dianthus alpinus L.

= Dianthus alpinus =

Alpine pink

Species of flowering plant

Dianthus alpinus, the alpine pink, is a species of flowering plant in the family Caryophyllaceae, endemic to the Alps of Eastern Austria. It is a short (2–10 cm high) mat-forming herbaceous perennial, with linear to lanceolate leaves, 15–25 mm long and 2–5 mm wide. The flowers are a deep cerise pink with white spots, appearing from June to August.

A calcicole, the species is found in the north-eastern limestone Alps of Austria from the Totes Gebirge in the west to Semmering and the Schneeberg in the east.

In cultivation in the UK. it has gained the Royal Horticultural Society's Award of Garden Merit. It requires a well-drained position in full sun, such as a rock garden. It may be short-lived in cultivation.

== Bibliography ==
- Grey-Wilson, C; Blamey, Marjorie (1979). The alpine flowers of Britain and Europe. Collins. ISBN 0002197499.
- Tutin, T.G.; Walters, S.M. (22 April 1993). "Dianthus". In T. G. Tutin (ed.). Flora Europea: Psilotaceae to Platanaceae. Vol. 1 (2nd ed.). Cambridge: Cambridge University Press. p. 239. ISBN 978-0-521-41007-6.
