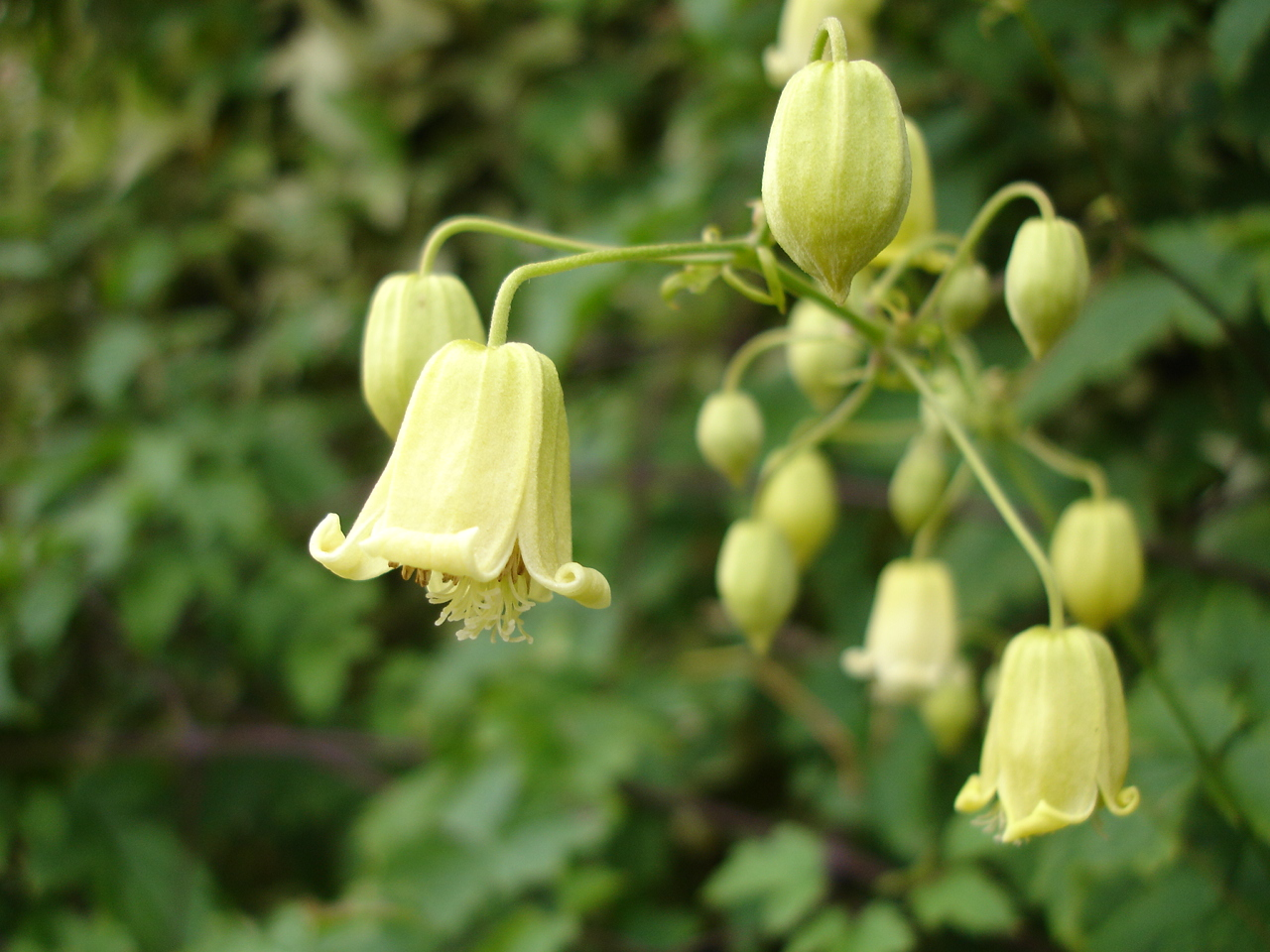
- Close up of flowers

Scientific classification
- Kingdom: Plantae
- Clade: Tracheophytes
- Clade: Angiosperms
- Clade: Eudicots
- Order: Ranunculales
- Family: Ranunculaceae
- Genus: Clematis
- Species: C. rehderiana

Binomial name
- Clematis rehderiana Craib

Synonyms
- Clematis veitchiana Craib

= Clematis rehderiana =

Species of flowering plant

Clematis rehderiana is a species of Clematis native to Nepal and China (Qinghai and Tibet). It has gained the Royal Horticultural Society's Award of Garden Merit.
