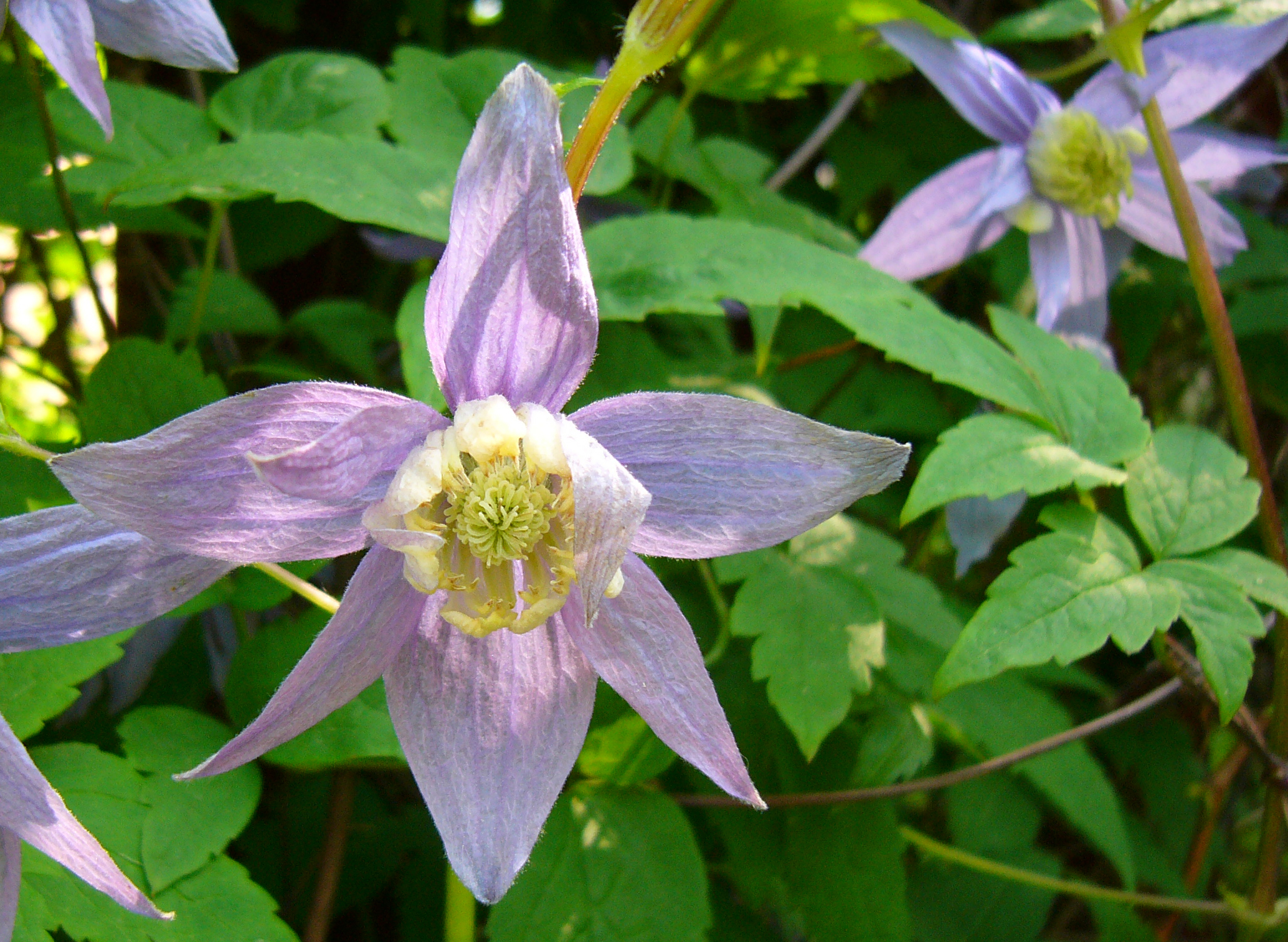

Scientific classification
- Kingdom: Plantae
- Clade: Tracheophytes
- Clade: Angiosperms
- Clade: Eudicots
- Order: Ranunculales
- Family: Ranunculaceae
- Genus: Clematis
- Species: C. macropetala

Binomial name
- Clematis macropetala Ledeb.

Synonyms
- List: Atragene macropetala (Ledeb.) Ledeb.; Atragene macropetala var. punicoflora (Y.Z.Zhao) Luferov; Atragene macropetala var. rupestris (Turcz. ex Kuntze) Luferov; Clematis alpina var. rupestris Turcz. ex Kuntze; Clematis macropetala var. puniciflora Y.Z.Zhao; Clematis macropetala f. rupestris (Turcz. ex Kuntze) Kitag.

= Clematis macropetala =

Species of flowering plant

Clematis macropetala is a species of flowering plant in the family Ranunculaceae native to northwestern China, Mongolia, and adjoining areas of Siberia. Its cultivars 'Ballet Skirt', 'Lagoon', 'Pauline', and 'Wesselton' have gained the Royal Horticultural Society's Award of Garden Merit.
