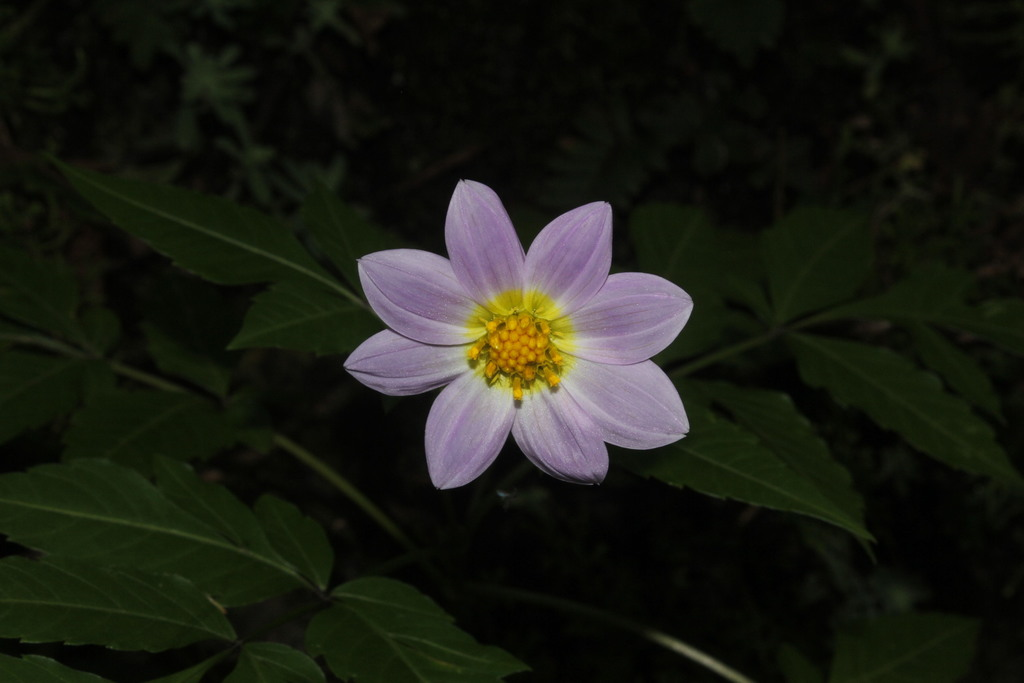

Scientific classification
- Kingdom: Plantae
- Clade: Tracheophytes
- Clade: Angiosperms
- Clade: Eudicots
- Clade: Asterids
- Order: Asterales
- Family: Asteraceae
- Genus: Dahlia
- Species: D. tamaulipana

Binomial name
- Dahlia tamaulipana J.Reyes, Islas & Art.Castro

= Dahlia tamaulipana =

Species of plant

Dahlia tamaulipana is a species of flowering plant in the family Asteraceae. One of the so-called "tree dahlias", it can grow to be 2.1 metres (7 feet) tall. It is native to Tamaulipas, Mexico, where it grows in wet, forested ravines in the Sierra Madre Oriental mountains, at elevations of 950 to 1,550 m (3,100 to 5,100 ft). It is occasionally available from commercial suppliers.
