= Dahlia campanulata =

- Flower and foliage
- Close-up of flower

Scientific classification
- Kingdom: Plantae
- Clade: Tracheophytes
- Clade: Angiosperms
- Clade: Eudicots
- Clade: Asterids
- Order: Asterales
- Family: Asteraceae
- Genus: Dahlia
- Species: D. campanulata

Binomial name
- Dahlia campanulata Saar, Sorenson & Hjert.

Species of plant

Dahlia campanulata, the weeping tree dahlia, is a species of flowering plant in the family Asteraceae, native to Guerrero and Oaxaca states, Mexico. It is available from commercial suppliers.
