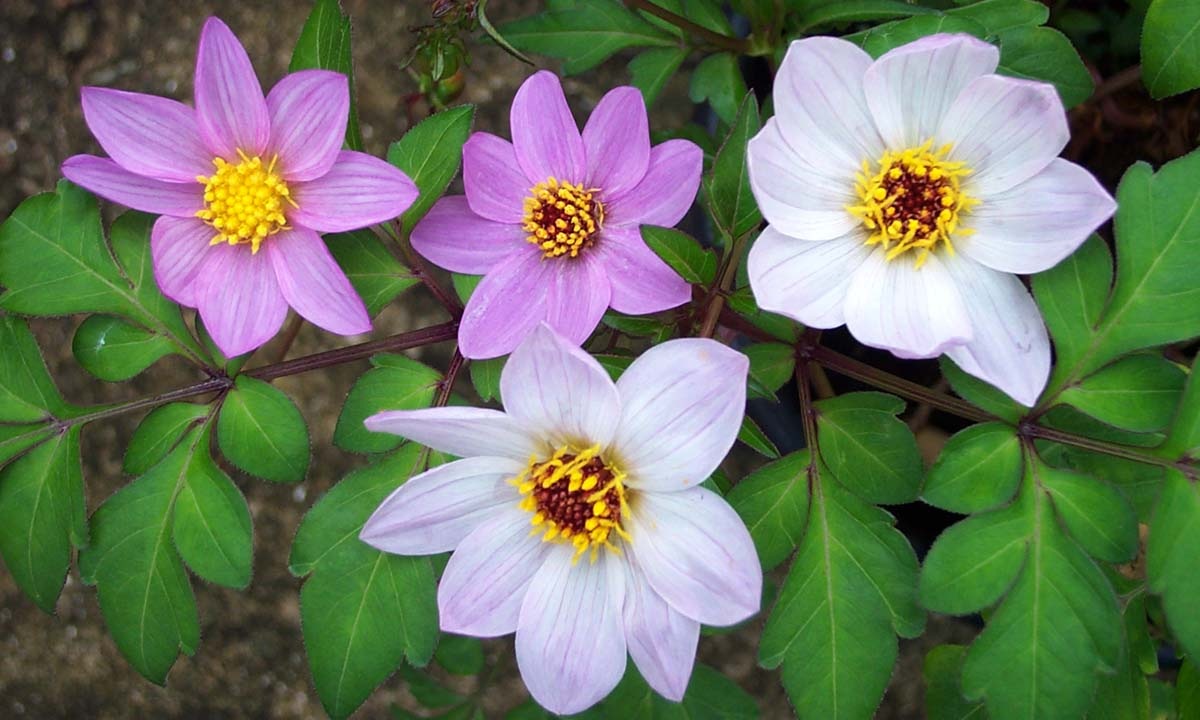

Scientific classification
- Kingdom: Plantae
- Clade: Tracheophytes
- Clade: Angiosperms
- Clade: Eudicots
- Clade: Asterids
- Order: Asterales
- Family: Asteraceae
- Genus: Dahlia
- Species: D. merckii

Binomial name
- Dahlia merckii Lehm.

Synonyms
- Dahlia scapigera f. merckii (Lehm.) Sherff; Dahlia cosmiflora Jacques; Dahlia decaisneana B.Verl.; Dahlia glabrata Lindl.; Dahlia minor Vis.

= Dahlia merckii =

Species of plant

Dahlia merckii, Merck's dahlia, is a tuberous species of perennial flowering plant in the daisy family, Asteraceae. This herbaceous plant grows to 2.5 metres (8 feet) in height. It has divided leaves, and in late summer to autumn produces single flowers in shades of lilac, white, and pink.

Native to Mexico, it is hardy only in milder areas which do not suffer prolonged frosts, where tubers may be left in the ground throughout the year, and protected with a mulch in the dormant season. Otherwise tubers must be lifted and stored over winter. They begin to sprout in spring, but must be protected until all danger of frost has passed. Propagation is by seed or cuttings in spring.

Dahlia merckii is unique among Dahlia species due to its chromosome count (n = 27) and the presence of rare acetylenic compounds, including a newly discovered hydrocarbon, heptadeca-1,7,9,13,15-pentaen-11-yne. These acetylenes may have a chemotaxonomic significance and could play a role in the plant’s defense mechanisms.

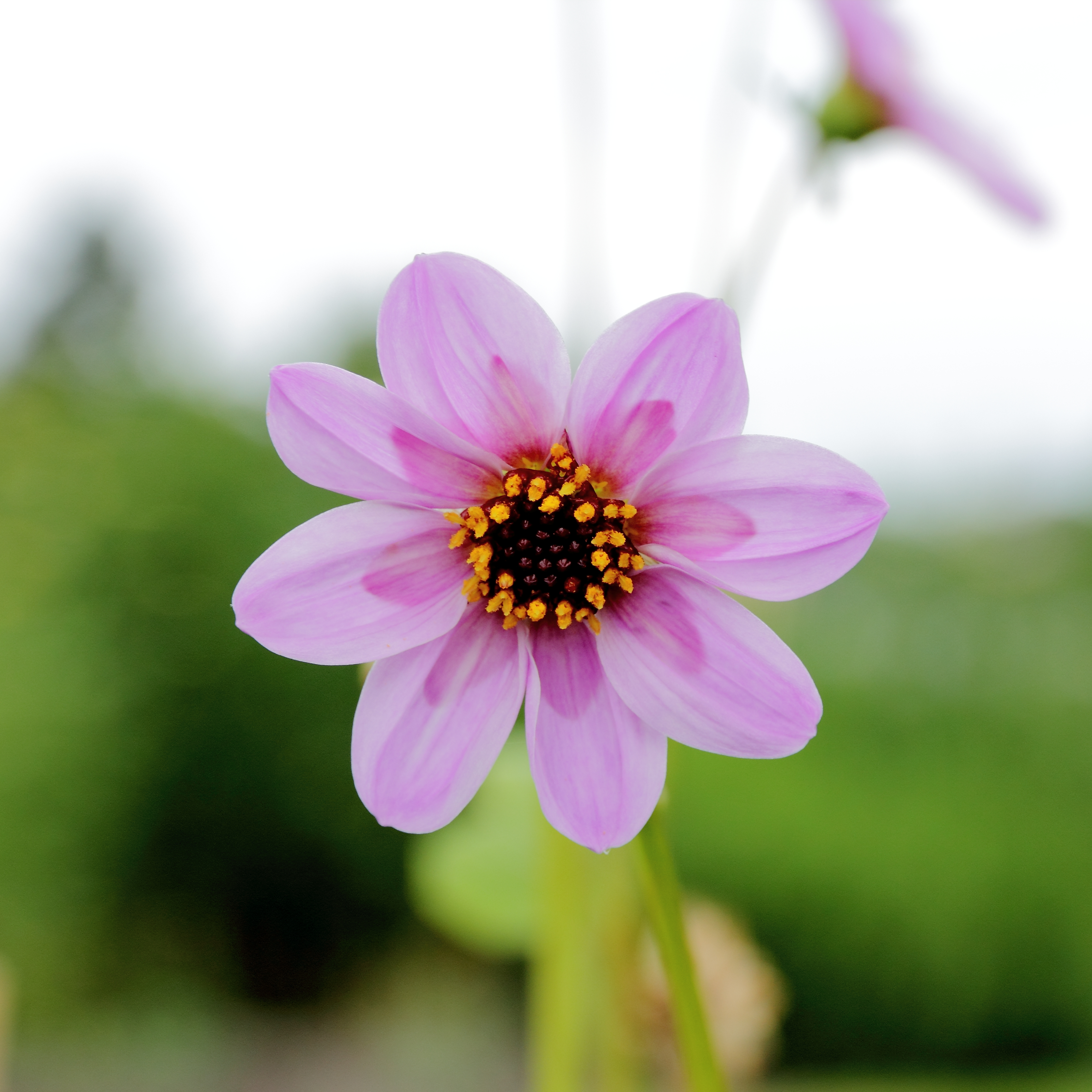
