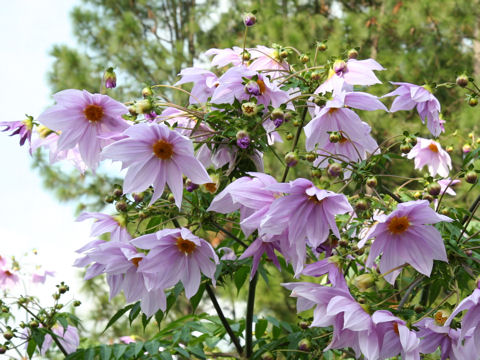

Conservation status
- Near Threatened (IUCN 3.1)

Scientific classification
- Kingdom: Plantae
- Clade: Tracheophytes
- Clade: Angiosperms
- Clade: Eudicots
- Clade: Asterids
- Order: Asterales
- Family: Asteraceae
- Genus: Dahlia
- Species: D. imperialis

Binomial name
- Dahlia imperialis Roezl ex Ortgies

Synonyms
- Dahlia arborea C.Huber; Dahlia arborea C.Huber; Dahlia dumicola Klatt; Dahlia lehmannii Hieron.; Dahlia lehmannii var. leucantha Sherff; Dahlia maximiliana Anon.; Dahlia maxonii Saff.

= Dahlia imperialis =

Species of flowering plant in the daisy family Asteraceae

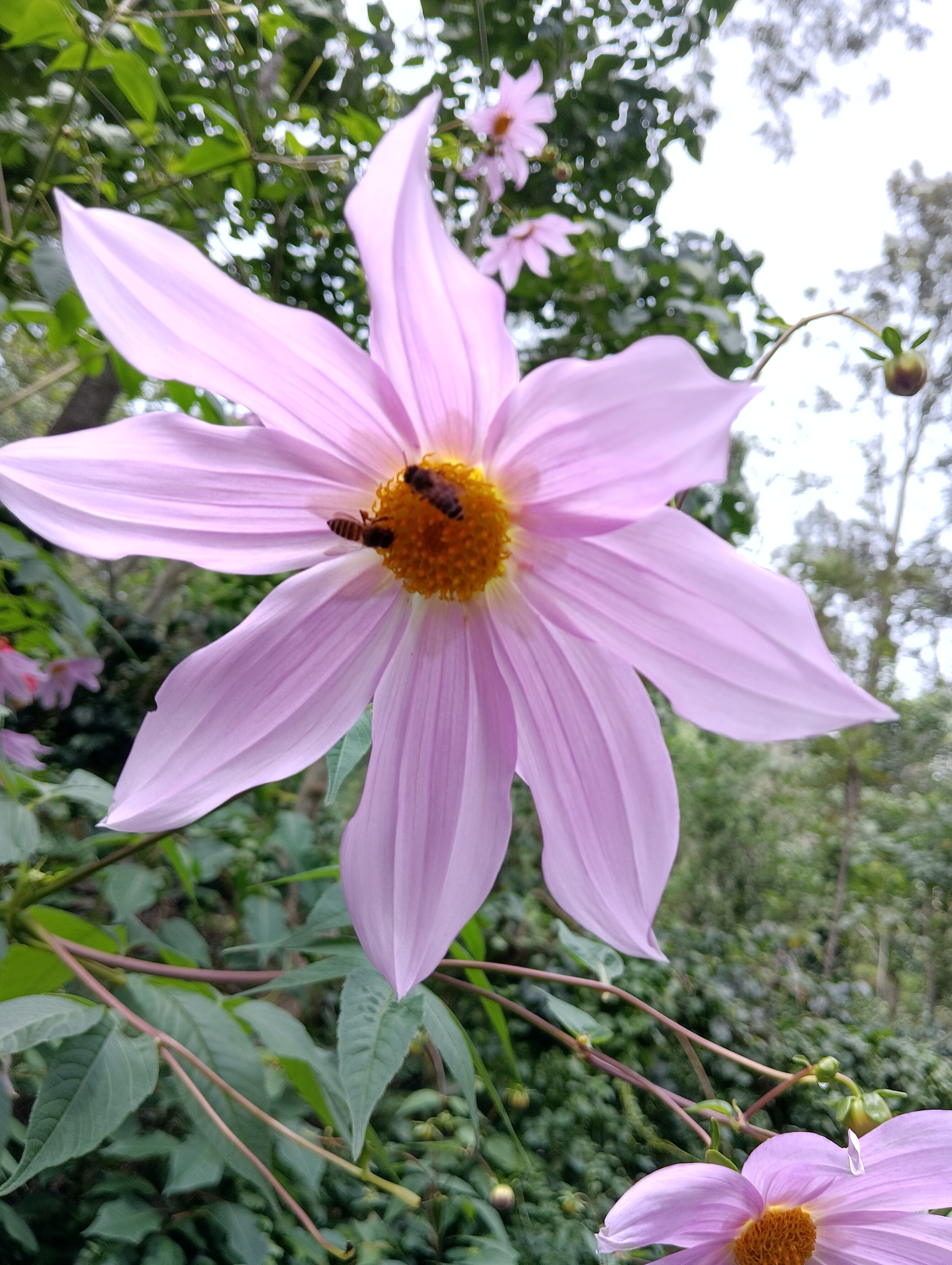
Honey bees on Dahlia imperialis flowers

Dahlia imperialis, the tree dahlia or imperial dahlia, is a large flowering plant of the family Asteraceae, native to the Americas from Mexico to Colombia.

== Description ==
Growing between 8–10 metres (26–33 feet) tall, it is a herbaceous perennial, growing rapidly in springtime from its tuber, after a dormant winter period (which may be brief in mild climates). From its underground base, the plant will begin sending up hollow, cane-like, 4-sided stems with swollen nodes and large, tripinnate leaves; foliage near the ground is quickly shed.

The pendant or nodding flowerheads are 7.5–15 centimetres (3–6 inches) across, with ray florets, typically a lavender or mauvish-pink in colour.

== Taxonomy ==
After some Dahlia species were brought from Mexico to Europe in the 16th century, D. imperialis was first described in 1863 by Benedikt Roezl (1823–1885), the Czech orchid collector and traveller who, ten years later (in 1872–73), embarked on a plant-collecting trip through the Americas.

== Distribution and habitat ==
It is native to Mexico, Belize, Guatemala, Honduras, El Salvador, Nicaragua, Costa Rica, Panama and south into Colombia and Ecuador. It is a plant of the uplands, mainly found in the foothills of subtropical or tropical mountains (above the humidity of the lower forests), at elevations around 1,500–1,700 m (4,900–5,600 ft).

== Cultivation ==
This species is fast-growing, the growth spurt being linked to shorter daylight hours; the tree dahlia usually comes into flower in autumn, before the risk of frost. Propagation is by seed or by stem cuttings, around 30 cm (12 in) long and having at least two nodes, laid horizontally about 5–10 cm under the soil; top-dressing with pea gravel, decomposed granite, or grit is optional but helpful for moisture retention, erosion control and additional drainage.

=== Uses ===
Many tuberous dahlia can be prepared and consumed like potatoes or cooked carrots. Additionally, the petals can be eaten on green salads or soups, and tree dahlia leaves are used as a dietary supplement by the Q'eqchi' people of San Pedro Carchá, Alta Verapaz, Guatemala.

== Gallery ==
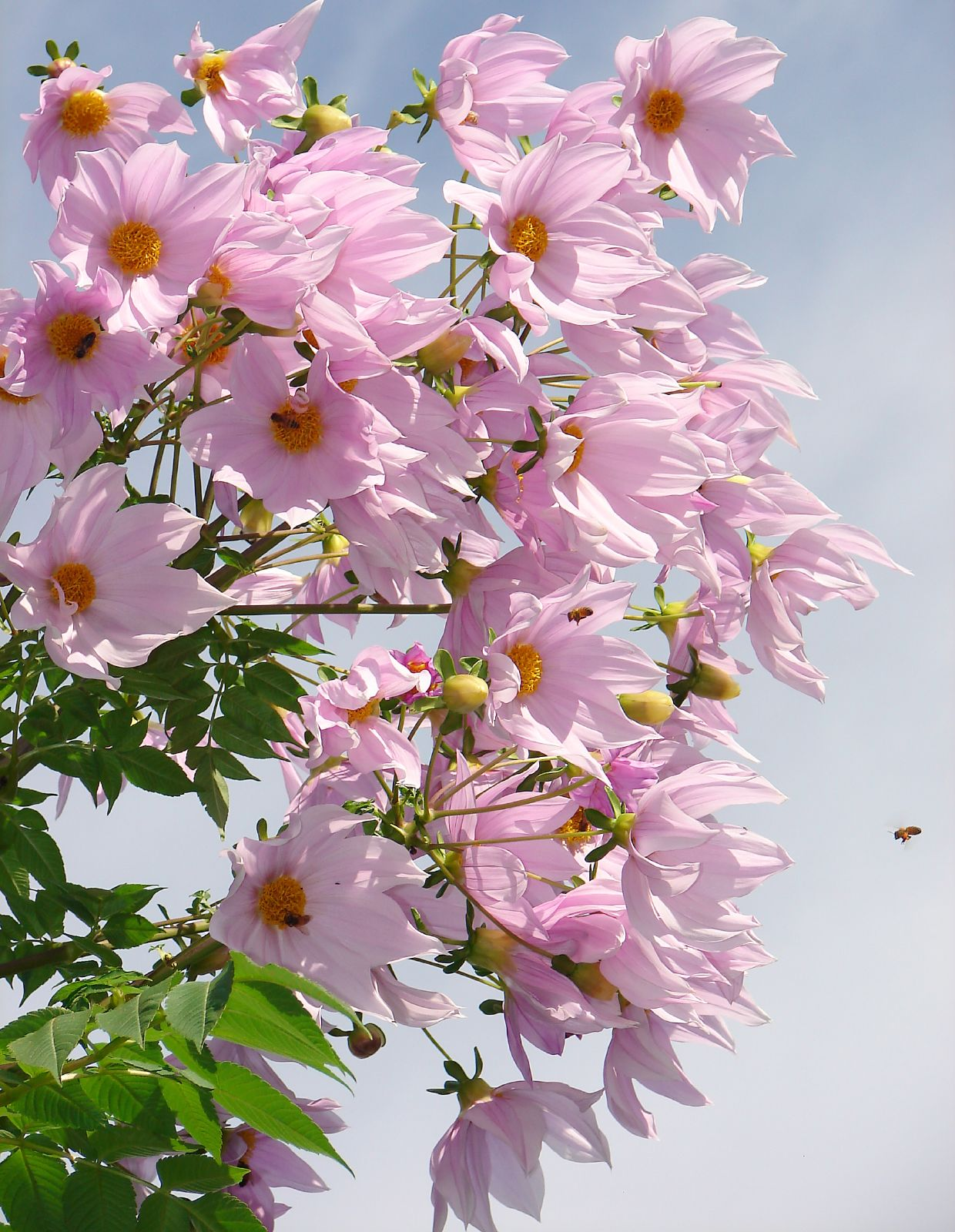
Flowers

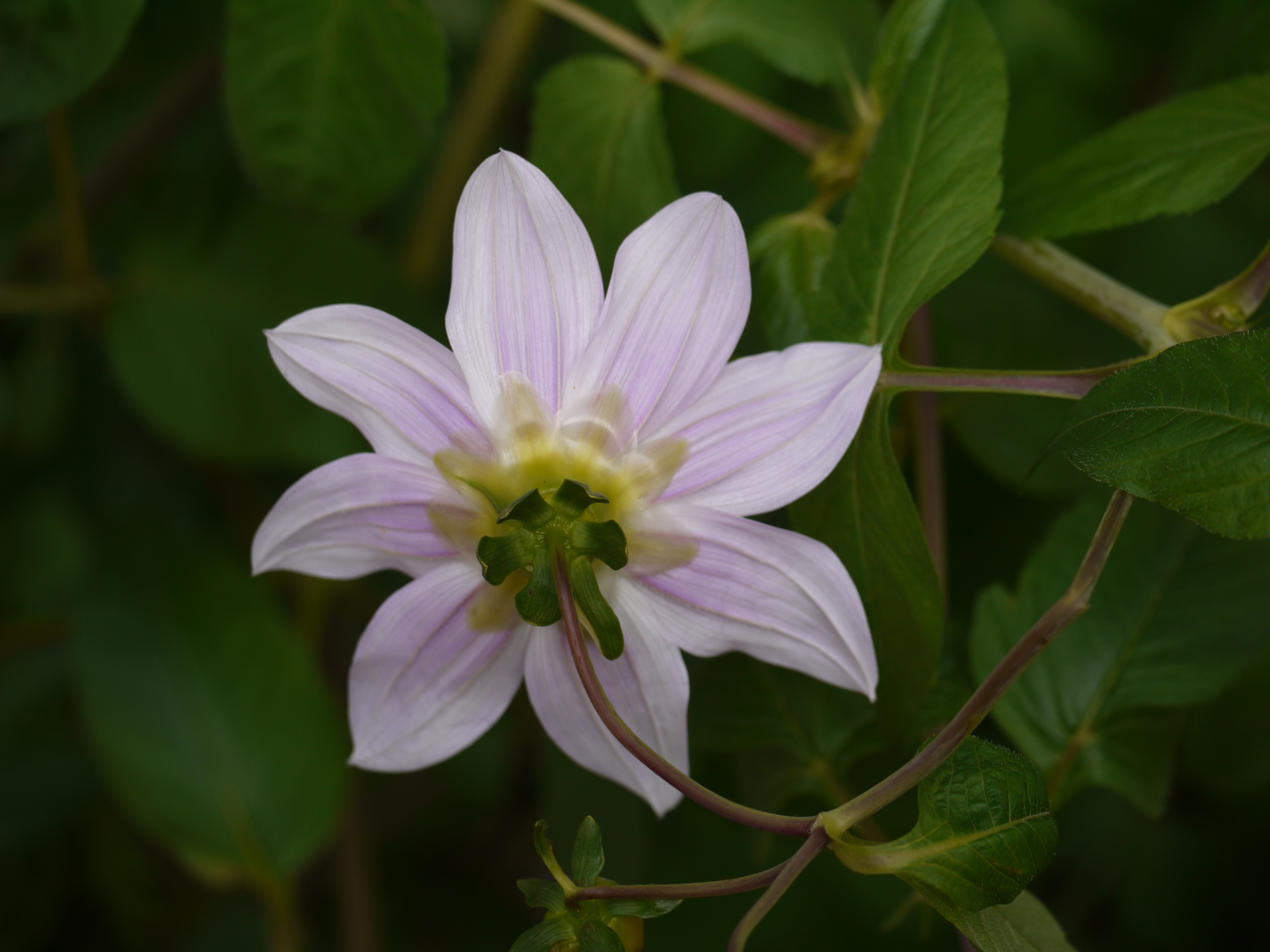
Back of flower

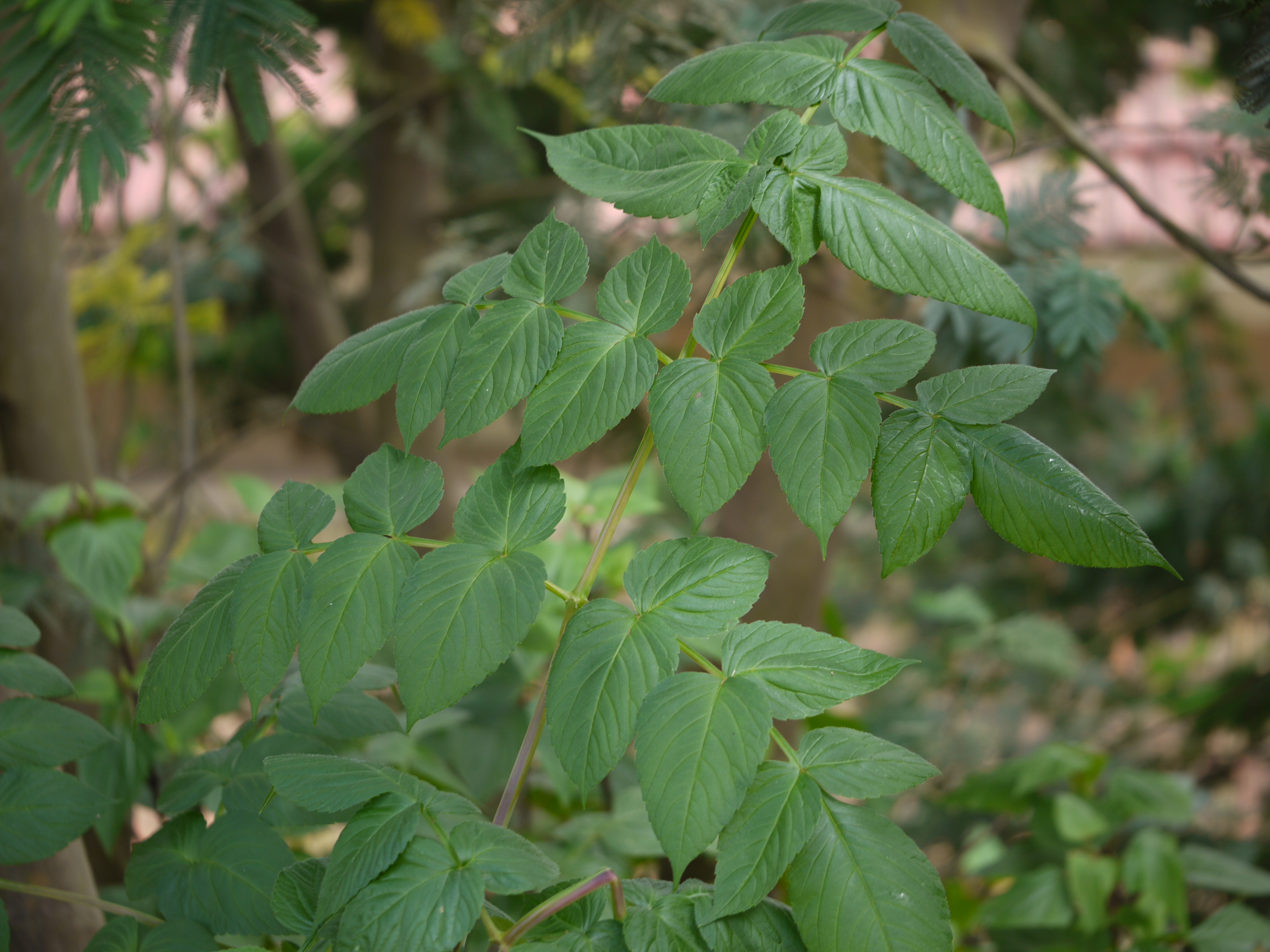
Leaves

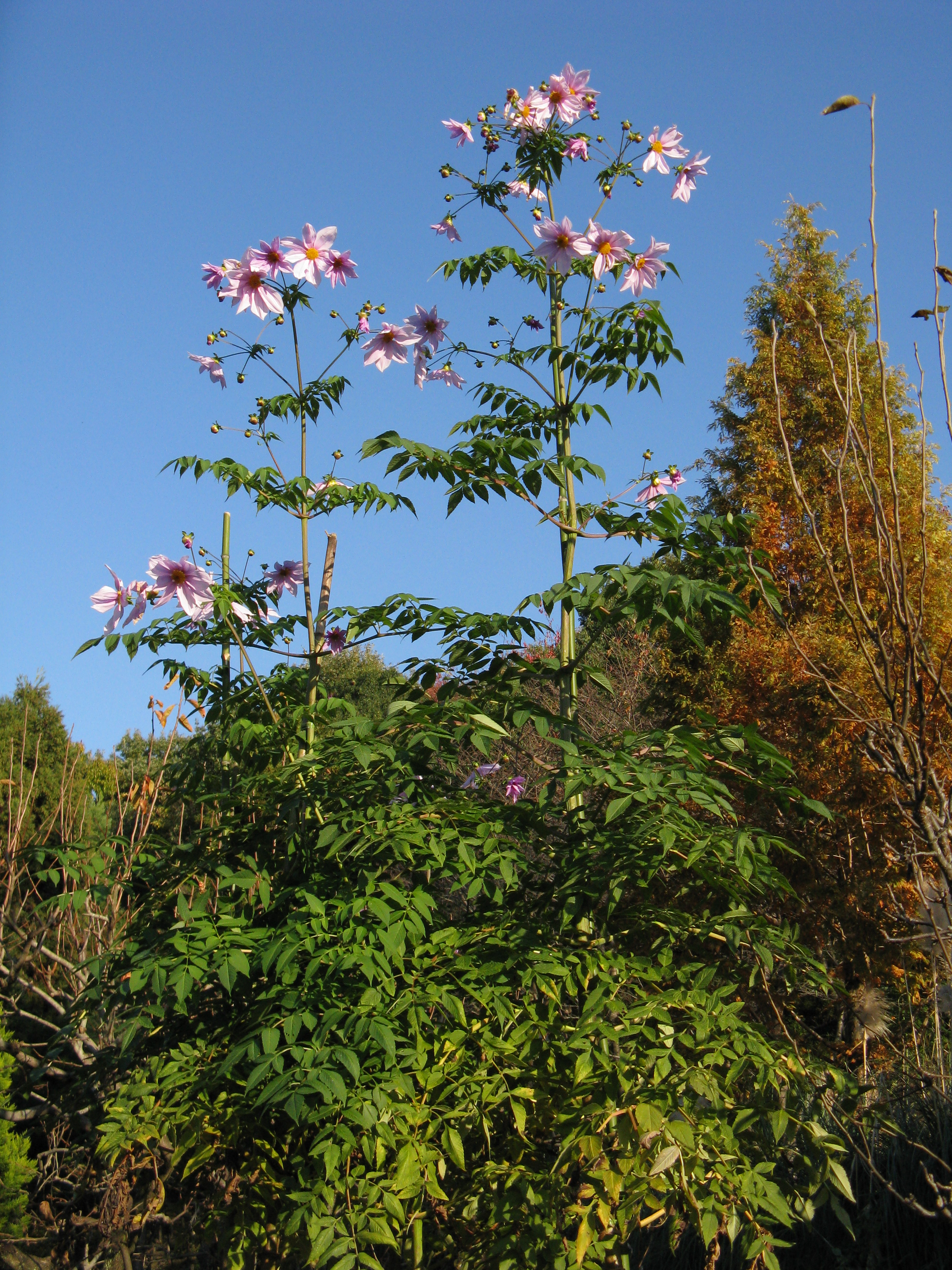
Plant
