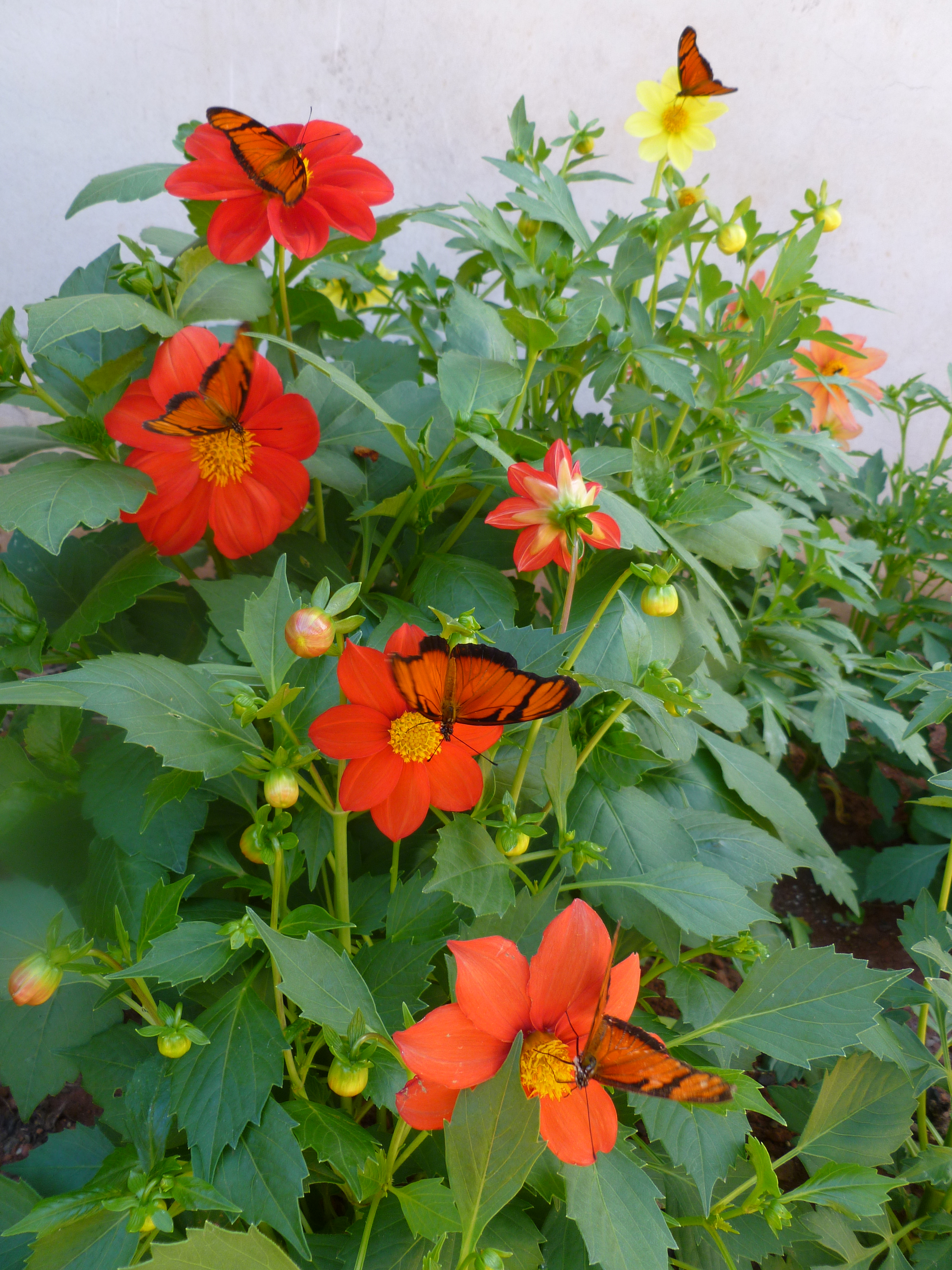

Scientific classification
- Kingdom: Plantae
- Clade: Tracheophytes
- Clade: Angiosperms
- Clade: Eudicots
- Clade: Asterids
- Order: Asterales
- Family: Asteraceae
- Genus: Dahlia
- Species: D. pinnata

Binomial name
- Dahlia pinnata Cav. 1791

Synonyms
- Bidens variabilis (Willd.) Baill.; Dahlia barkeriae Knowles & Westc.; Dahlia crocata Lag.; Dahlia rosea Cav.; Dahlia variabilis (Willd.) Desf.; pinnate dahlia

= Dahlia pinnata =

Species of flowering plant

Dahlia pinnata (D. × pinnata) is a species in the genus Dahlia, family Asteraceae, with the common name garden dahlia. It is the type species of the genus and is widely cultivated.

== Description ==
Dahlia pinnata is a perennial herbaceous plant with a rhizome and tuberous roots, reaching a height of 70 to 120 centimetres (28 to 47 inches), rarely 160 cm. The stem is erect, and branched only in the inflorescence. The leaves are usually simple, with leaflets that are ovate and 5–10 centimetres (2–4 in) long. The plant is slightly shaggy.

Between July and October, atop stems 5 to 15 cm in length are two to eight flower heads, 6 to 10 cm in diameter. The eight florets have a length of 3 to 5 cm, are ovate and coloured pink to deep purple.

== Taxonomy ==
Hansen and Hjerting in (1996) demonstrated that Dahlia pinnata should more properly be designated D. x pinnata. D. x pinnata was shown to actually be a variant of D. sorensenii that had acquired hybrid qualities before it was introduced to Europe in the sixteenth century and formally named by Cavanilles. The original wild D. pinnata is presumed extinct.

== Distribution and habitat ==
It is geographically located in Central America, tending to grow at borders. The plant occurs in Mexico in the mountains around Mexico City.

== Ecology ==
Dahlias tend to attract quite a bit of insects and other animals, some which are dangerous and harmful to their survival. Slugs, earwigs, red spider mites, snails, caterpillars, aphids, and thrips threaten dahlias because they can eat the petals, leave slime trials, leave tattered petals, etc. Dahlias can also become infected with the following diseases: Sclerotinia disease, fungal diseases, mildew, Botrytis, Crown Gall, etc. If dahlias do become infected with these they can wilt, have spots on the leaves, the leaves can get irregular coloring/ patterning, etc.

A study on Dahlia pinnata showed that this D. pinnata was able to accumulate high levels of arsenic from the soil through its roots.

== Cultivation ==
Used as an ornamental plant, and was cultivated by the Aztecs before the discovery of America, and was introduced to Spain in 1798. Modern dahlias are often the product of hybridisation between D. pinnata and D. coccinea. As cut flowers, dahlias have a long lifespan.

Besides being used for their outside appearance, dahlias tend to be used for their medicinal properties as well. According to Glenn Ross Whitley, this plant's roots contain some inulin and the tubers have "antibiotic compounds concentrated in [their] skin". This apparently contributed to the status of the plant as an "important root crop and medicinal plant among the pre-Columbian Indians of central Mexico, Yucatan and Guatemala".

Dahlias prefer rich soil (pH level estimated at around 6.5–7.5) with enough organic matter. The roots must be kept moist since they are very shallow rooted which means they usually become dry fairly frequently and quickly. They bloom around mid-summer through the beginning of winter, they are able to survive a light frost, but anything colder/harsher than that, they will not be able to keep thriving. When the harsh weather of winter is approaching, the dahlias should be dug up and stored in a safer place for them.

Many dahlia pinnata types can grow from seeds but more often they are cultivated by division of the tuberous roots or by stem cuttings. Providing the flower with some kind of plant food (mulch, growing media, nutrient food, etc.) can really make the dahlia healthier and more likely to survive.

== Uses ==
The plant's phytostabilization properties regarding arsenic could lower the risk of the harmful carcinogen to humans.
