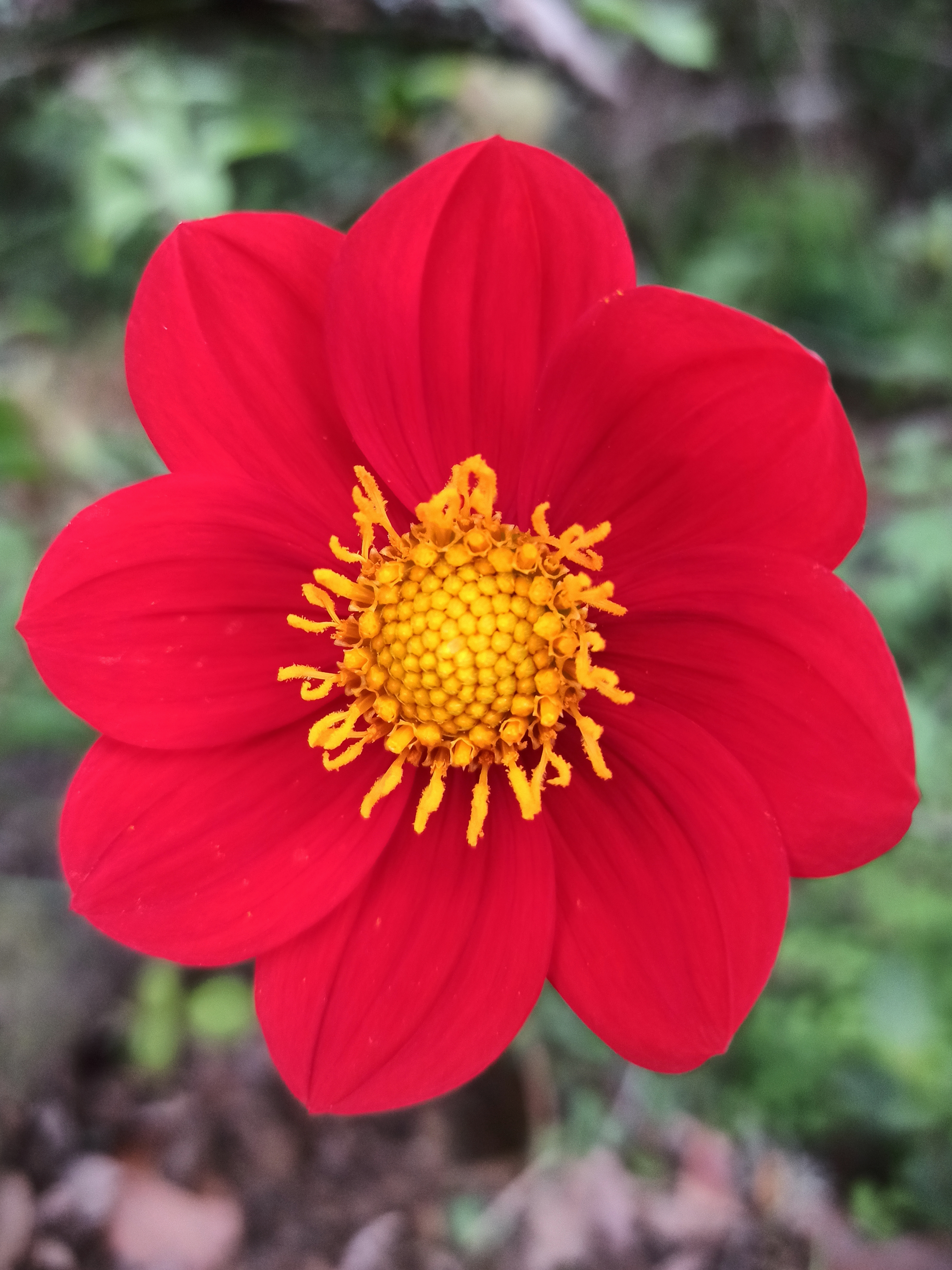

Scientific classification
- Kingdom: Plantae
- Clade: Embryophytes
- Clade: Tracheophytes
- Clade: Angiosperms
- Clade: Eudicots
- Clade: Asterids
- Order: Asterales
- Family: Asteraceae
- Genus: Dahlia
- Species: D. coccinea

Binomial name
- Dahlia coccinea Cav.

Synonyms
- Bidens cervantesii (Lag.) Baill. ex B.D.Jacks. [Illegitimate]; Bidens coccinea (Cav.) Baill.; Dahlia acutiflora Moc. & Sessé ex DC. [Invalid]; Dahlia bidentifolia Salisb.; Dahlia cervantesii (Sweet) Lag.; Dahlia chisholmii Rose; Dahlia coccinea var. gentryi (Sherff) Sherff; Dahlia coccinea var. palmeri Sherff; Dahlia coccinea var. steyermarkii Sherff; Dahlia coronata Hort. ex Sprague; Dahlia crocata Sessé ex Lag.; Dahlia crocea Willd.) Poir.; Dahlia crocea var. coccinea Poir.; Dahlia crocea var. flava (Willd.) Poir.; Dahlia frustranea (DC.) DC.; Dahlia gentryi Sherff; Dahlia gracilis Ortgies; Dahlia jaurezii Van der Berg; Dahlia lutea Van der Berg; Dahlia pinnata var. cervantesii (Lag. ex Sweet) Voss; Dahlia pinnata var. coccinea (Cav.) Voss; Dahlia pinnata var. gracilis (Ortgies) Voss; Dahlia popenovii Saff.; Georgina cervantesii Lag. ex Sweet; Georgina coccinea (Cav.) Willd.; Georgina coccinea var. crocea Willd.; Georgina coccinea var. flava Willd.; Georgina crocata Sweet; Georgina frustranea DC.; Georgina frustranea var. coccinea DC.; Georgina frustranea var. crocea (Willd.) DC.; Georgina frustranea var. flava (Willd.) DC.

= Dahlia coccinea =

Species of flowering plant in the daisy family

Dahlia coccinea is a species of flowering plant in the daisy family Asteraceae. Its common name is red dahlia, although the flowers can be orange or occasionally yellow, as well as the more common red. The species is native to Mexico but has long been cultivated in other countries for its showy flowers.

== Uses ==
Tubers of the plant were used as a food source by the Aztecs, though this use largely died out after the Spanish conquest. The tubers are highly nutritious.
