= Award of Garden Merit =

Award for plants by the British Royal Horticultural Society

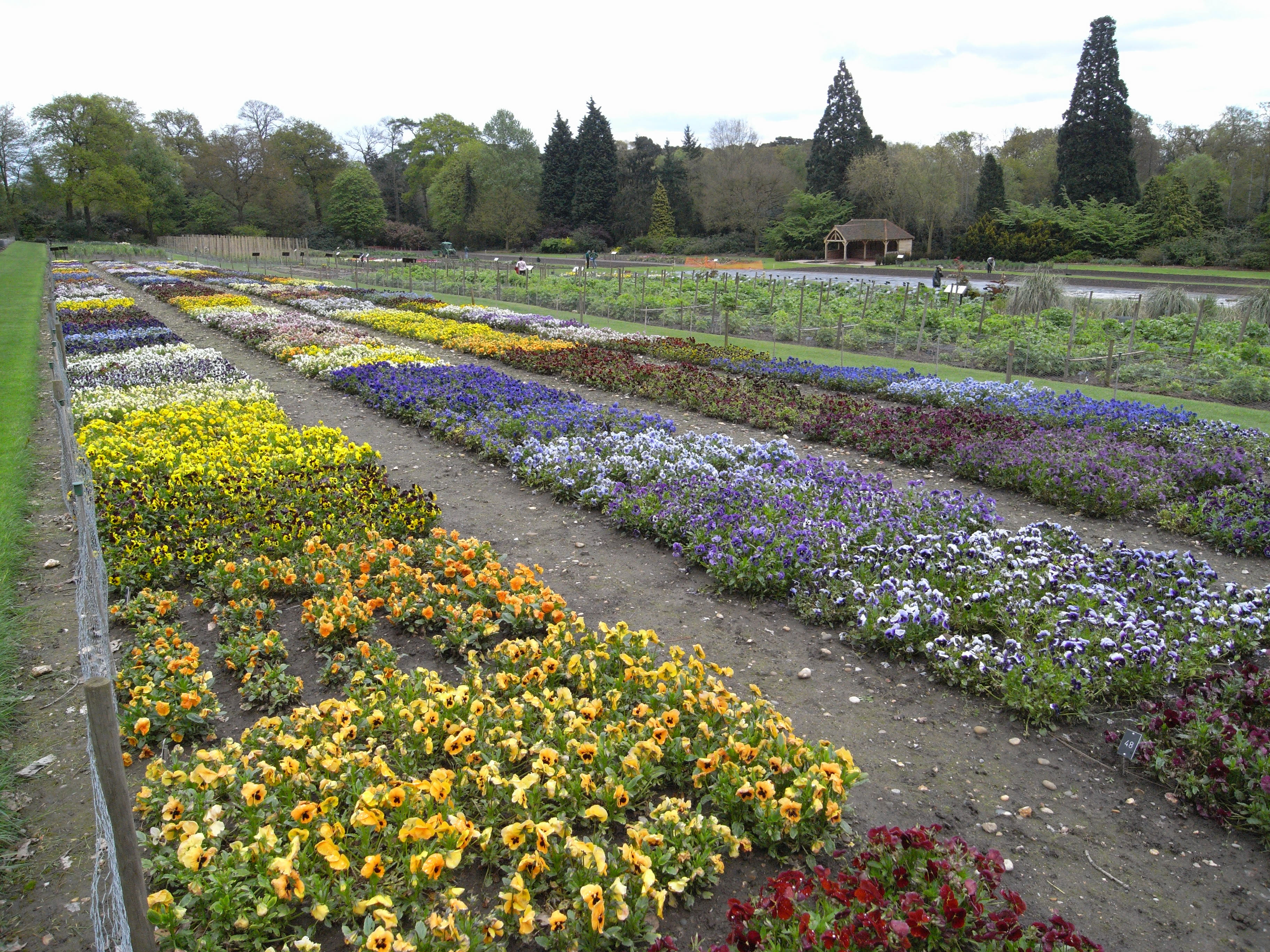
Trials field at the RHS Garden Wisley, showing some of the hundreds of varieties assessed for the RHS Recommended: Award of Garden Merit

The RHS Recommended: Award of Garden Merit is an award for plants by the British Royal Horticultural Society (RHS). It is based on assessment of the plants' performance under UK growing conditions.

It includes the full range of cultivated plants, from annuals, biennials and perennials to shrubs and trees. It covers plants grown for specific purposes—such as vegetable crops, fruit, hedging, topiary, groundcover, summer bedding, houseplants, etc. It tests characteristics such as robustness, hardiness, longevity, flowering/fruiting abundance and quality, usefulness, and ease of cultivation. It pays particular attention to a plant's ability to survive and thrive in challenging conditions such as wind and frost.

The RHS Recommended: AGM trophy symbol is widely used in gardening literature as a sign of exceptional quality, and is recognised as such by writers, horticulturalists, nurseries, and everybody in the UK who practises gardening.

== History ==
The Award of Garden Merit is a mark of quality awarded, since 1922, to garden plants (including trees, vegetables and decorative plants) by the United Kingdom, Royal Horticultural Society (RHS). Awards are made annually after plant trials intended to judge the plants' performance under UK growing conditions. Trials may last for one or more years, depending on the type of plant being analysed, and may be performed at Royal Horticulture Society Garden in Wisley and other gardens or after observation of plants in specialist collections. Trial reports are made available as booklets and on the website. Awards are reviewed annually in case plants have become unavailable horticulturally, or have been superseded by better cultivars.

== Similar awards ==
The award should not be confused with the Royal Horticulture Society's Award of Merit (AM), given to plants deemed "of great merit for exhibition" i.e. for show, not garden, plants.

Since 1989, France has had similar awards called the Mérites de Courson, but these are drawn from a limited number of plants submitted by nurserymen to juries at the twice-yearly Journées des Plantes de Courson and awards are based solely on the opinions of the jury members as to the plants' likely performance in French gardens, rather than on extensive trials.

All-America Selections is an independent non-profit organization that tests new, never-before-sold varieties for the home gardener.

Plants of Merit are plants selected for their outstanding quality and dependable performance for the lower Midwest United States.

== Reviews ==
The RHS Recommended: Award of Garden Merit was reviewed in 1992, to increase its usefulness and prestige. Field trial results gained weight in the assessments and existing award-winning plants were reviewed in the light of more recent experience. The awards were to be reviewed at 10 year intervals from 1992, but this frequency has been increased to annually. The 2012/13 review, with advice from experts such as Royal Horticultural Society's plant committees, specialist societies, Plant Heritage National Collection holders and others, resulted in many changes. Nearly 1,900 plants lost their merit awards and more than 1,400 plants gained awards; the list included 7,073 plants after the review.

=== Rescission ===
Plants may be added to the Royal Horticultural Society "Sunset List" for rescission for several reasons, including unavailability to gardeners, better plants becoming available, affliction by pests or diseases, or insufficient uniformity.

== Criteria ==
To qualify for an Award of Garden Merit, a plant

- must be available horticulturally
- must be of outstanding excellence for garden decoration or use
- must be of good constitution
- must not require highly specialist growing conditions or care
- must not be particularly susceptible to any pest or disease
- must not be subject to an unreasonable degree of reversion.

The "Award of Garden Merit" symbol represents a cup-shaped trophy with handles. It is cited together with a hardiness rating as follows:

- H1 Requires a heated glasshouse
  - H1a Warmer than 15 °C/59 °F: tropical plants for indoors and heated greenhouses
  - H1b 10 °C/50 °F to 15 °C/59 °F: subtropical plants for indoors and heated greenhouses
  - H1c 5 °C/41 °F to 10 °C/50 °F: warm temperate plants that can go outdoors in summer
- H2 1 °C/34 °F to 5 °C/41 °F: plants that need a frost-free greenhouse in winter
- H3 −5 °C/23 °F to 1 °C/34 °F: hardy outside in some regions or situations, or which - while usually grown outside in summer - need frost protection in winter (e.g. dahlias)
- H4 −10 °C/14 °F to −5 °C/23 °F: plants hardy outside in most of the UK in an average winter
- H5 −15 °C/5 °F to −10 °C/14 °F: plants hardy outside in most of the UK in severe winters
- H6 −20 °C/−4 °F to −15 °C/5 °F: plants hardy outside in the UK and northern Europe
- H7 Colder than −20 °C/−4 °F: plants hardy outside in the severest European climates

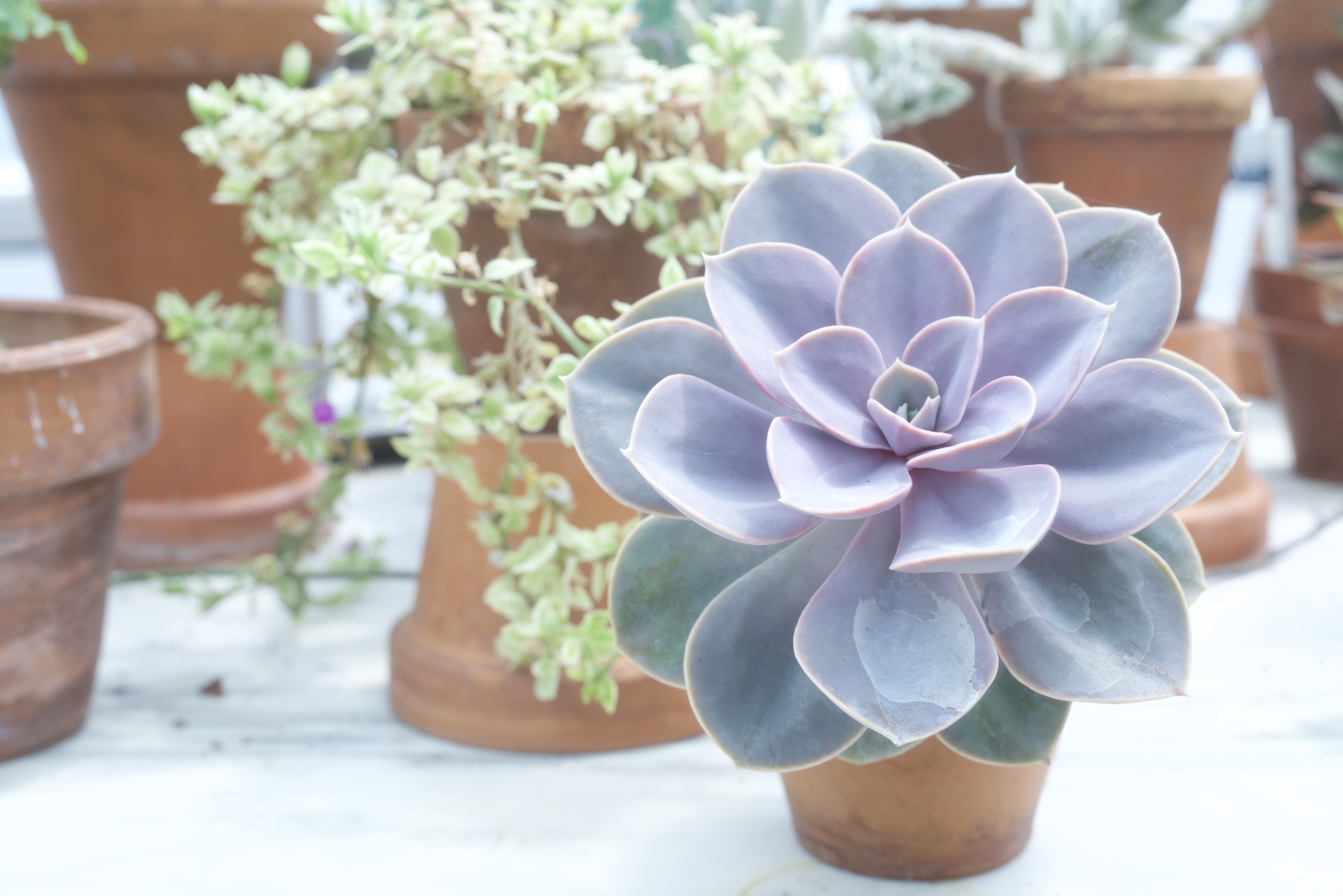
Echeveria 'Perle von Nürnberg', a winner of the Award of Garden merit

== See also ==
- List of Award of Garden Merit camellias
- List of Award of Garden Merit clematis
- List of Award of Garden Merit dahlias
- List of Award of Garden Merit dianthus
- List of Award of Garden Merit flowering cherries
- List of Award of Garden Merit magnolias
- List of Award of Garden Merit maples
- List of Award of Garden Merit narcissus
- List of Award of Garden Merit rhododendrons
- List of Award of Garden Merit roses
- List of Award of Garden Merit sweet peas
- List of Award of Garden Merit tulips
