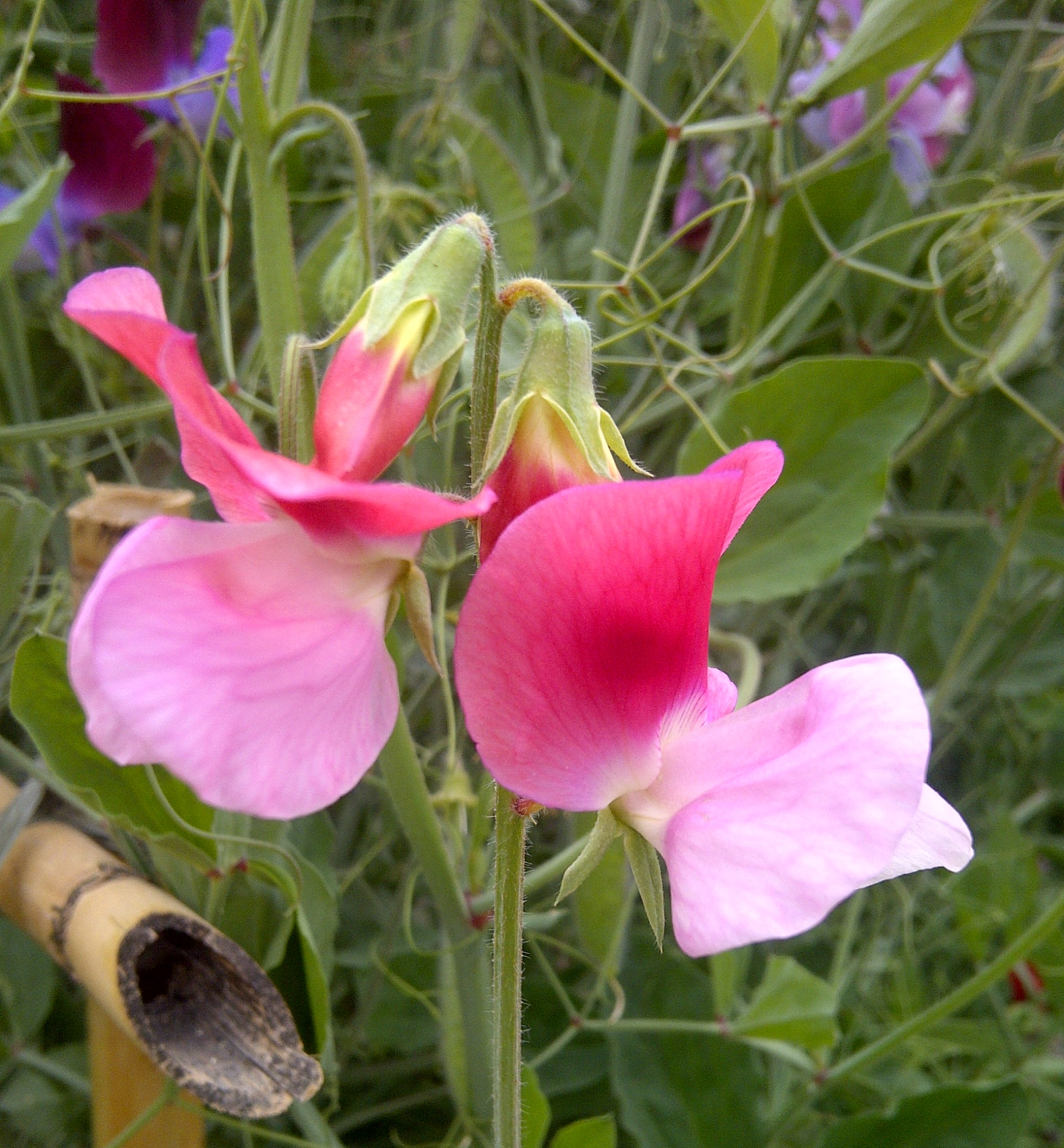

Conservation status
- Critically Endangered (IUCN 3.1)

Scientific classification
- Kingdom: Plantae
- Clade: Tracheophytes
- Clade: Angiosperms
- Clade: Eudicots
- Clade: Rosids
- Order: Fabales
- Family: Fabaceae
- Subfamily: Faboideae
- Genus: Lathyrus
- Species: L. odoratus

Binomial name
- Lathyrus odoratus L.

= Sweet pea =

Species of flowering plant in the pea and bean family Fabaceae

The sweet pea, Lathyrus odoratus, is a flowering plant in the genus Lathyrus in the family Fabaceae (legumes), native to Sicily, southern Italy and the Aegean Islands.

It is an annual climbing plant, growing to a height of 1–2 metres (3 ft 3 in – 6 ft 7 in) when suitable support is available. The leaves are pinnate with two leaflets and a terminal tendril, which twines around supporting structures and helps the sweet pea to climb. In the wild plant the flowers are purple, 2–3.5 cm (3/4–1 1/2 in) broad; they are larger and highly variable in color in cultivars. The blooms are usually strongly scented.

The annual species, L. odoratus, may be confused with the everlasting pea, L. latifolius, a perennial.

== Horticultural development ==
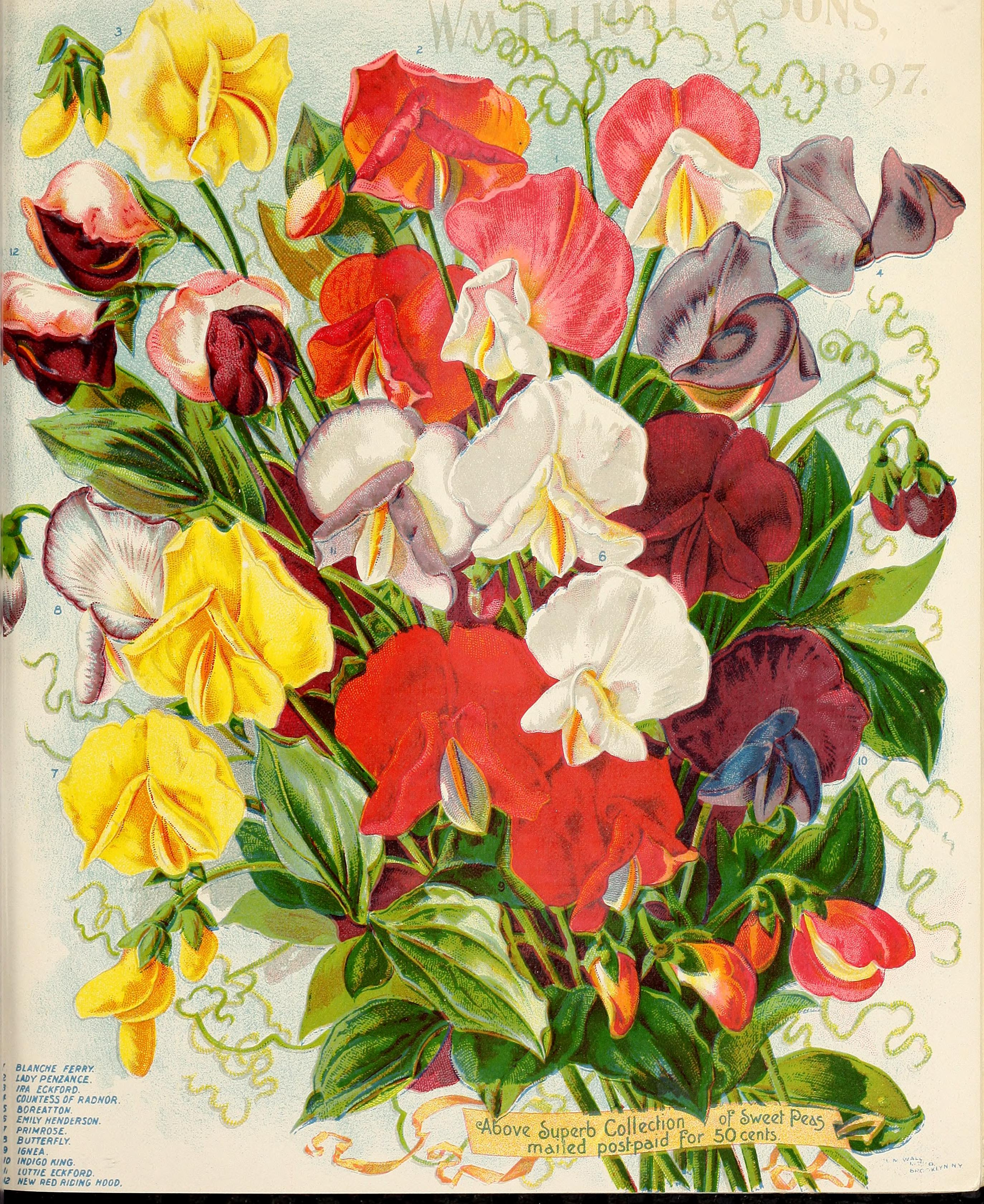
Sweet peas, advertised 1897

Sweet peas, native to Sicily and Sardinia, were first mentioned by the Franciscan monk and botanist Francesco Cupani in the Hortus Catholicus (1696). Cupani first studied medicine before entering the Franciscan order in 1681 at the age of 24. As a monk he continued to cultivate his interest in natural sciences and botany, particularly the study of the endemic flora of Sicily. In 1692, Cupani became the first Director of the botanic garden at Misilmeri, where he is believed to have cultivated sweet peas.

Cupani's scrambling sweet peas had small, short-stalked, bicolored flowers arranged in pairs and were sweetly scented. Cupani is believed to have sent seed to a number of botanists, including the English botanists Robert Uvedale in Enfield, and Jacob Bobart in Oxford, and the Dutch botanist Jan Commelin who published a description and illustration of sweet peas growing in Amsterdam.

Despite the general lack of early interest amongst gardeners, some nurserymen including the British horticulturist Robert Furber began to offer sweet peas for sale as early as 1730. Still, by the mid 19th century only 5 cultivars or variants were available; Cupani's wild type sweet pea and types with white, black (or very dark purple), red, or mixed pink and white flowers.

Over the course of the 19th century however, horticulturists, nurserymen and gardeners alike began to breed new variants, leading to the formation of dwarf, cretin, hoods and picotee cultivars. The Scottish nurseryman Henry Eckford (1823–1905) cross-bred and developed the sweet pea, turning it from a rather insignificant if sweetly scented flower into a floral sensation of the 19th century.

His initial success and recognition came while serving as head gardener for the Earl of Radnor, raising new cultivars of pelargoniums and dahlias. In 1870 he went to work for one Dr. Sankey of Sandywell near Gloucester. A member of the Royal Horticultural Society, he was awarded a First Class Certificate (the top award) in 1882 for introducing the sweet pea cultivar 'Bronze Prince', marking the start of association with the flower. In 1888 he set up his development and trial fields for sweet peas in Wem in Shropshire. By 1901, he had introduced a total of 115 of the 264 cultivars grown at the time. Eckford was presented with the RHS Victoria Medal of Honour for his work. He died in 1906, but his work was continued for a time by his son John Eckford.

More recently, the association between the sweet pea, the Eckfords and Wem has been highlighted again. In the late 1980s, the Sweet Pea Society of Wem started an annual show. Many of the street signs now carry a sweet-pea motif, and an area of the town is known as Eckford Park. There is also a cultivar 'Dorothy Eckford', named after a family member.

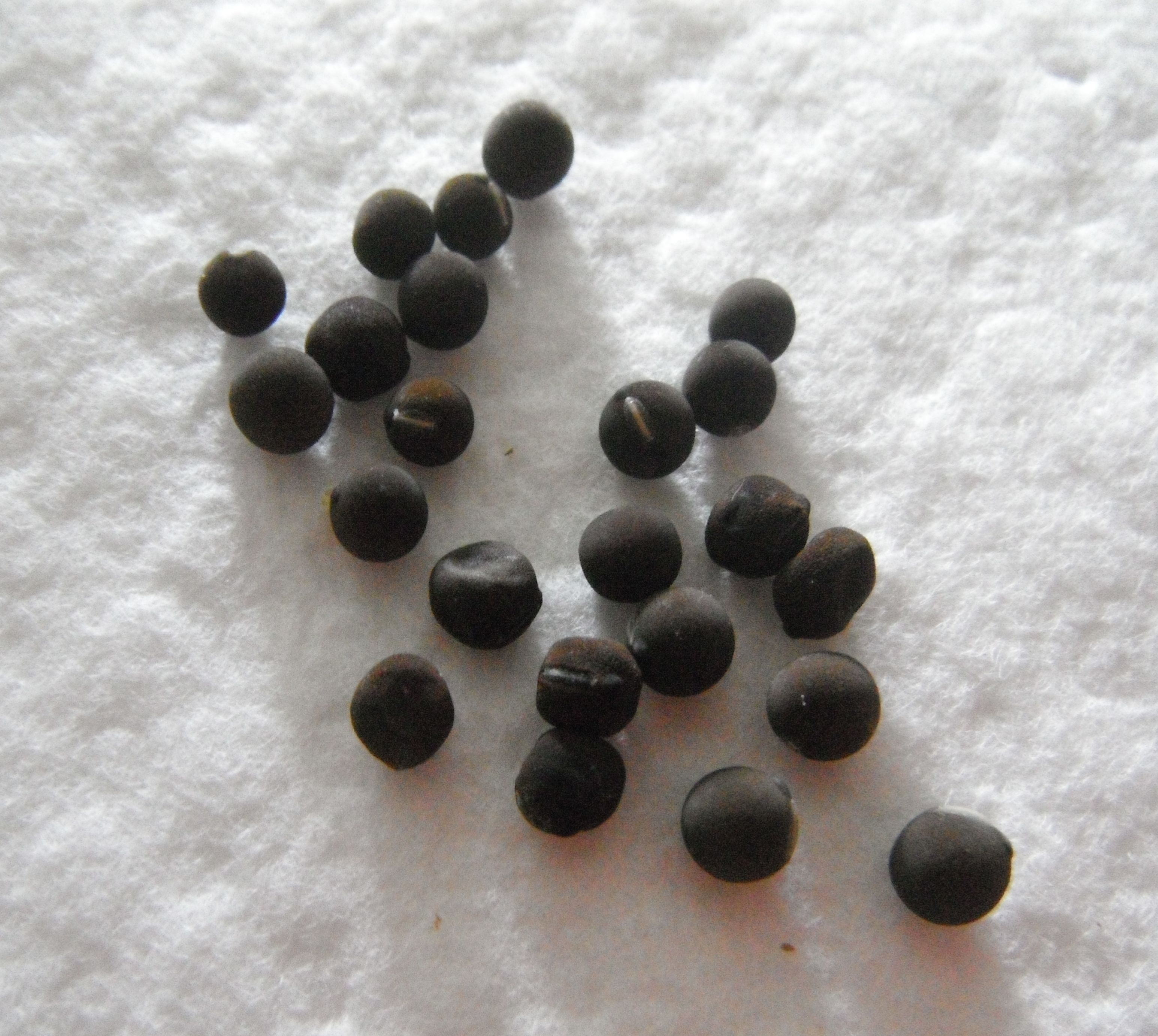
Seeds

== Cultivation ==
Sweet peas have been cultivated since the 17th century and a vast number of cultivars are commercially available. They are grown for their flower colour (usually in pastel shades of blue, pink, purple and white, including bi-colours), and for their intense unique fragrance. They are grown by gardeners for private enjoyment or for exhibition, and in the floristry trade. The large, pea-shaped seeds are sown in cold frames in Spring or Autumn. The seeds benefit from pre-soaking or chipping with a sharp blade. The plants are also available later in the season, as young plants or plugs. They are grown up canes, with the new shoots being regularly pinched out to promote a bushy habit and higher flower yields. Plants typically reach heights of 1–2 metres (3 ft 3 in – 6 ft 7 in), with the flowers appearing in midsummer and continuing for many weeks if regularly deadheaded.

Over 50 cultivars have gained the Royal Horticultural Society's Award of Garden Merit.

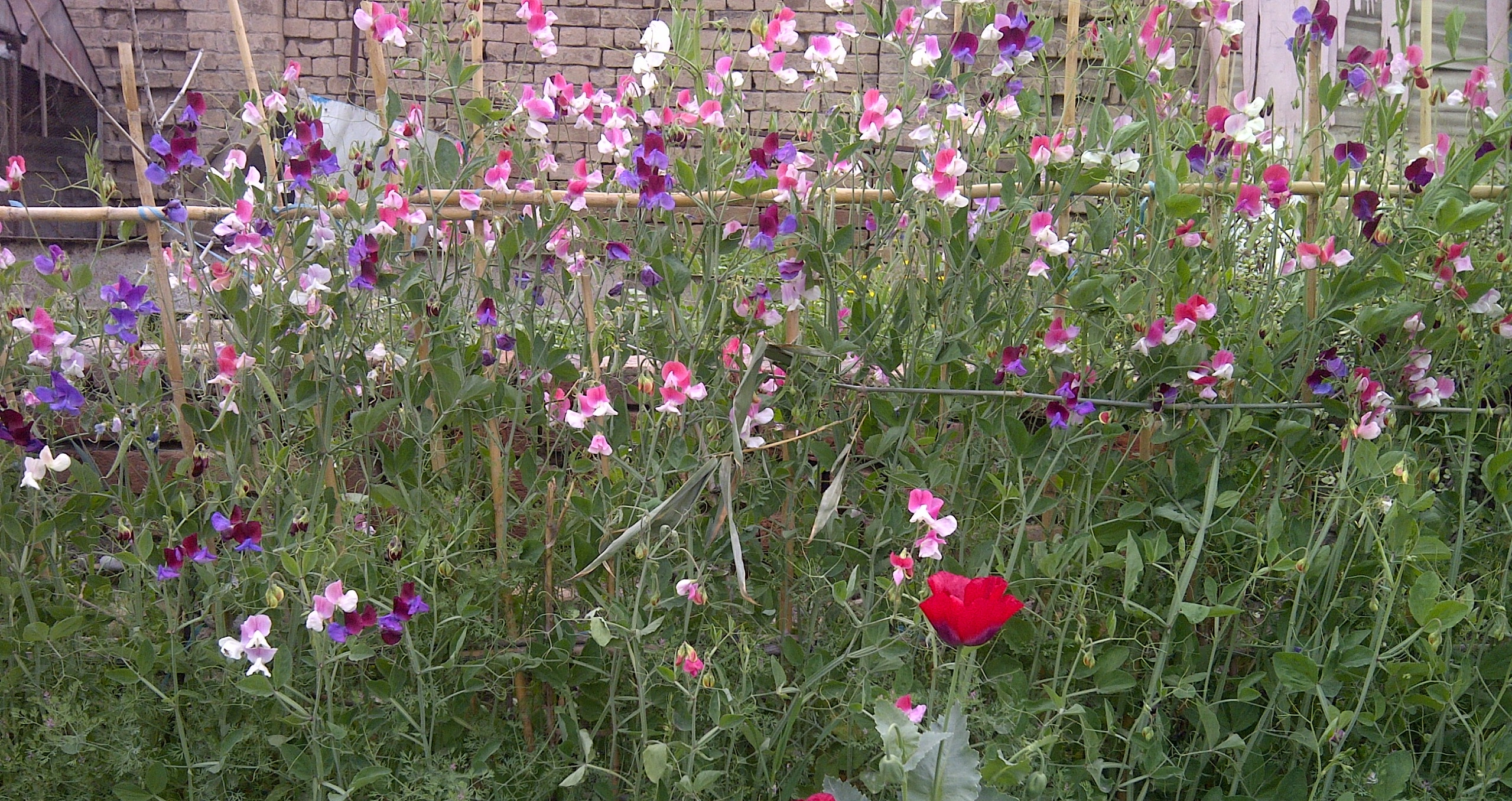
A bed of sweet peas climbing up a frame

In the UK the National Collection of Sweet Peas was started by Roger Parsons in 1991, when he offered to host a collection of Lathyrus at Hotham Park, Bognor Regis. At the time Parsons was working as Head of Parks and Landscape for Arun District Council. The collection achieved National Collection status in 1993 and now holds about 1300 species and cultivars from around the world. English Sweet Peas, operated by Phil Johnson, now incorporates Roger Parsons Sweet Peas and Johnson will maintain and add to the National Collection. Johnson has submitted an application to Plant Heritage to become the new custodian.

== Pests and diseases ==
The sweet pea plant suffers from some pests, the most common being aphids. These insects suck the sap out of the plants, reducing growth. Mosaic virus is spread by greenfly, causing yellowing of leaves, distortion of new shoots, and inhibited flowering.

A pest called the pollen beetle, which is small, shiny and black, eats the pollen and disfigures the flowers. Other pests include caterpillars, thrips, slugs and snails. Another problem is powdery mildew; this is a white powdery coating that covers the leaves and slows down growth, and can be caused when sweet peas are planted too close to each other, sucking nutrients from the plants and stunting their growth.

The sweet pea is also susceptible to ethylene in quantities produced by senescing plants. Because of this, growers are encouraged to plant sweet peas away from fruit trees among other plants prone to early dieback or senescence.

== Toxicity ==
Unlike the edible pea, there is evidence that seeds of members of the genus Lathyrus are toxic if ingested in quantity. A related species, Lathyrus sativus, is grown for human consumption but when it forms a major part of the diet it causes symptoms of toxicity called lathyrism.

In studies of rats, animals fed a diet of 50% sweet pea seeds developed enlarged adrenals relative to control animals fed on edible peas. The main effect is thought to be on the formation of collagen. Symptoms are similar to those of scurvy and copper deficiency, which share the common feature of inhibiting proper formation of collagen fibrils. Seeds of the sweet pea contain beta-aminopropionitrile that prevents the cross-linking of collagen by inhibiting lysyl oxidase and thus the formation of allysine, leading to loose skin. Recent experiments have attempted to develop this chemical as a treatment to avoid disfiguring skin contractions after skin grafting.

== Genetics ==
Gregor Mendel, who was a Catholic friar, and botanist, is today recognized as the "Father of Genetics" for his work with the cross breeding of pea plants (Pisum sativum) with different characteristics, and the sweet pea has been used in a similar way. The sweet pea is thus a model organism being used in early experimentations in genetics, particularly by the pioneer geneticist Reginald Punnett. It is highly suitable as a genetic subject because of its ability to self-pollinate and its easily observed Mendelian traits such as colour, height and petal form. Many genetic principles were discovered or confirmed in this species. It was used by Punnett in early studies of genetic linkage. Complementary factor inheritance was also elucidated in sweet peas, from the cross of two pure-breeding white strains which gave rise to a blue hybrid, the blue colour requiring two genes derived independently from the two white parents.

== Hybridization with Lathyrus belinensis ==
Like the blue rose, the yellow sweet pea remains elusive. Lathyrus belinensis is a related Lathyrus species which has red and yellow flowers. There are ongoing attempts to bring the yellow colour into Lathyrus odoratus by hybridizing it with Lathyrus belinensis. Several new hybrid sweet pea cultivars have been created as a result, though not any with the yellow flower colour so far. The hybrid cultivars belong to the hybrid species Lathyrus × hammettii.

== Gallery ==
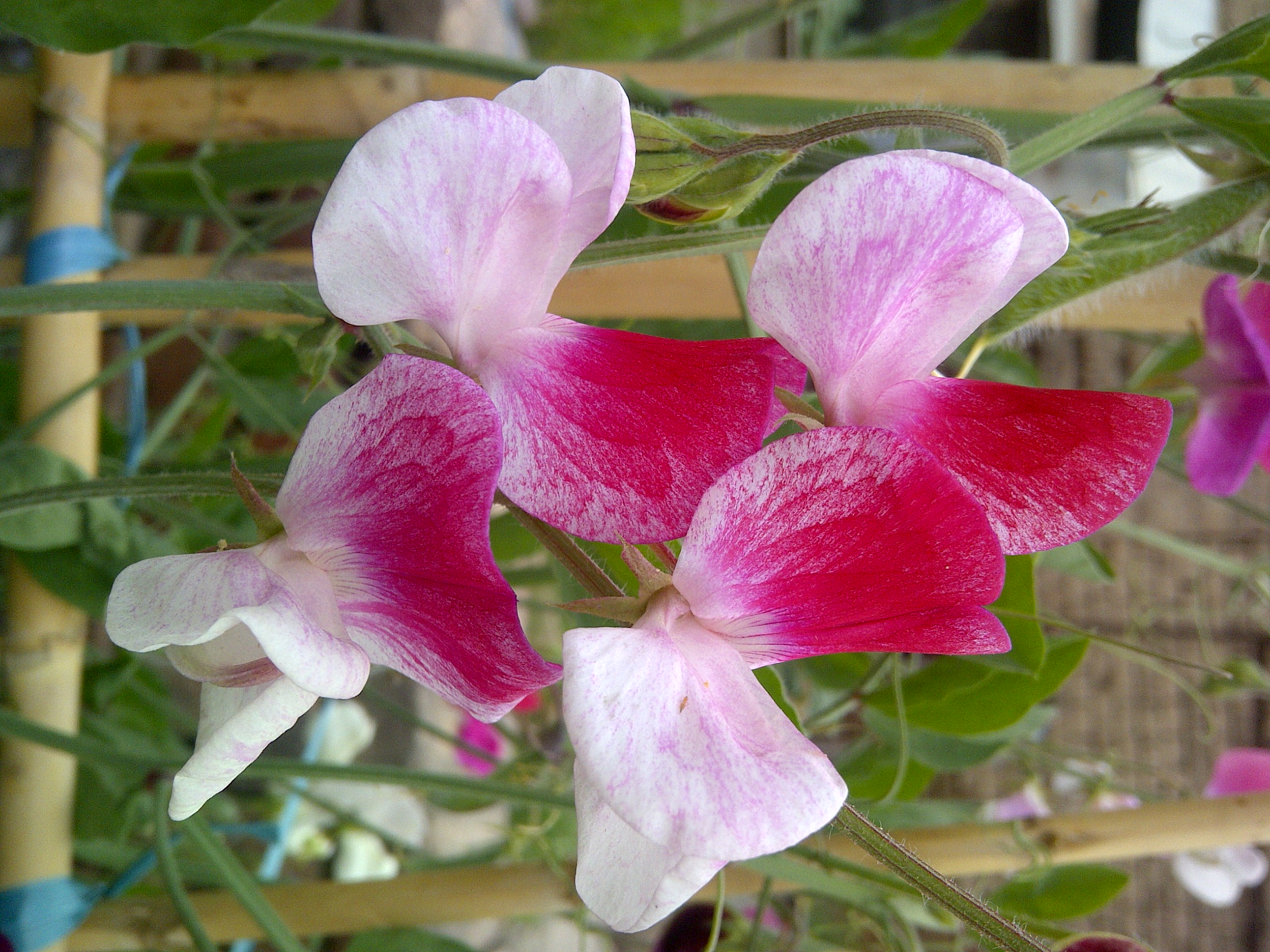

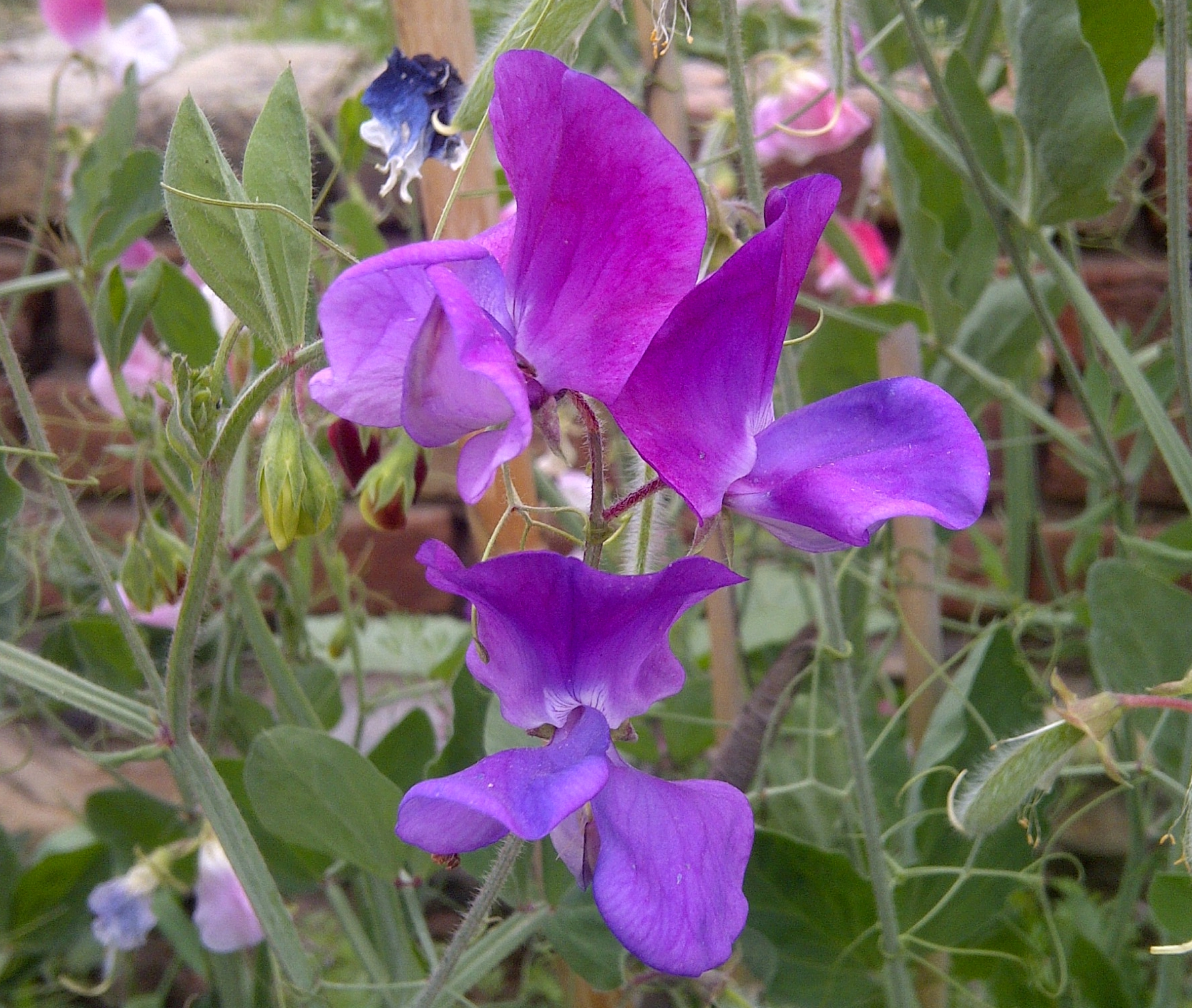

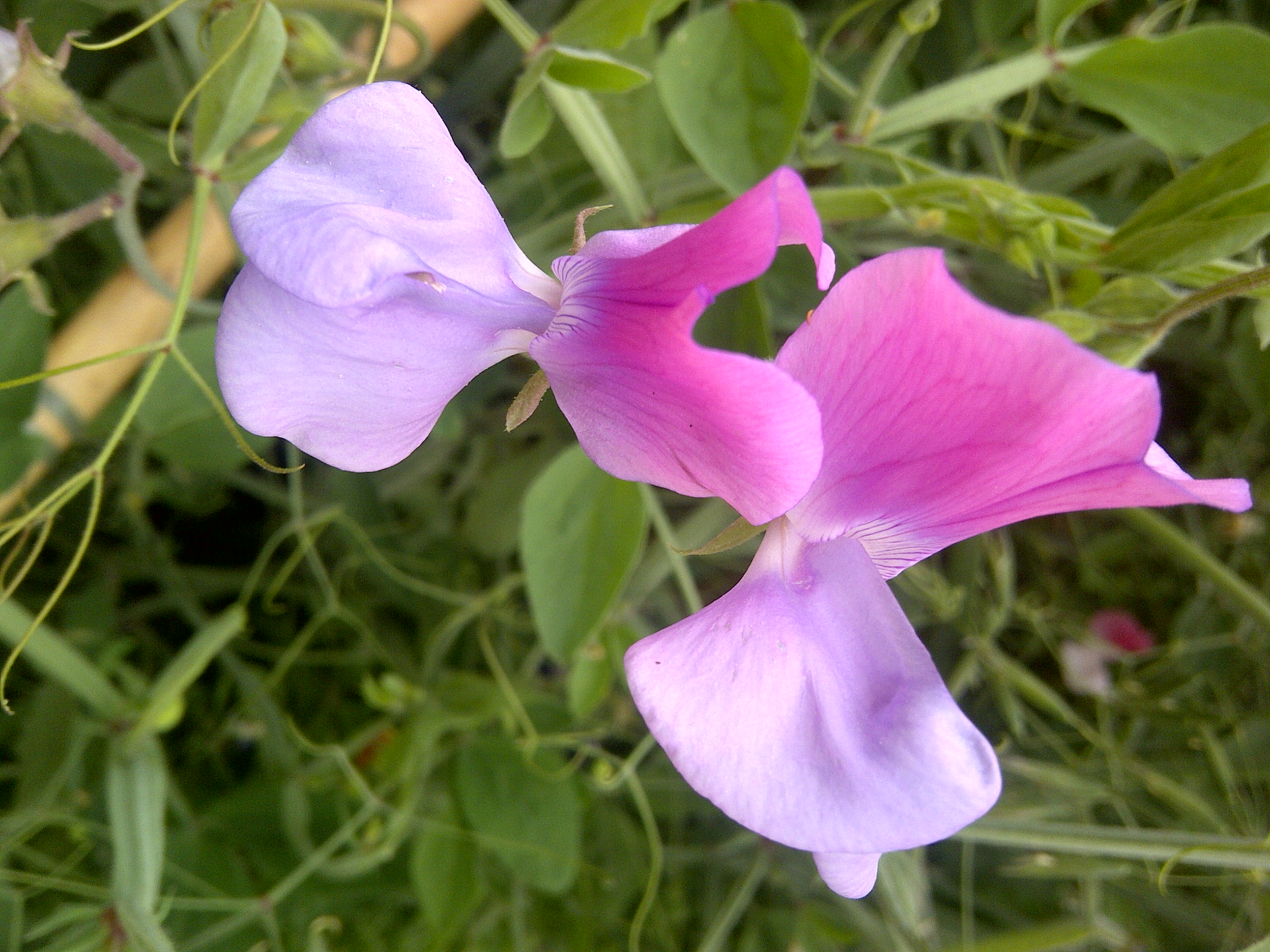

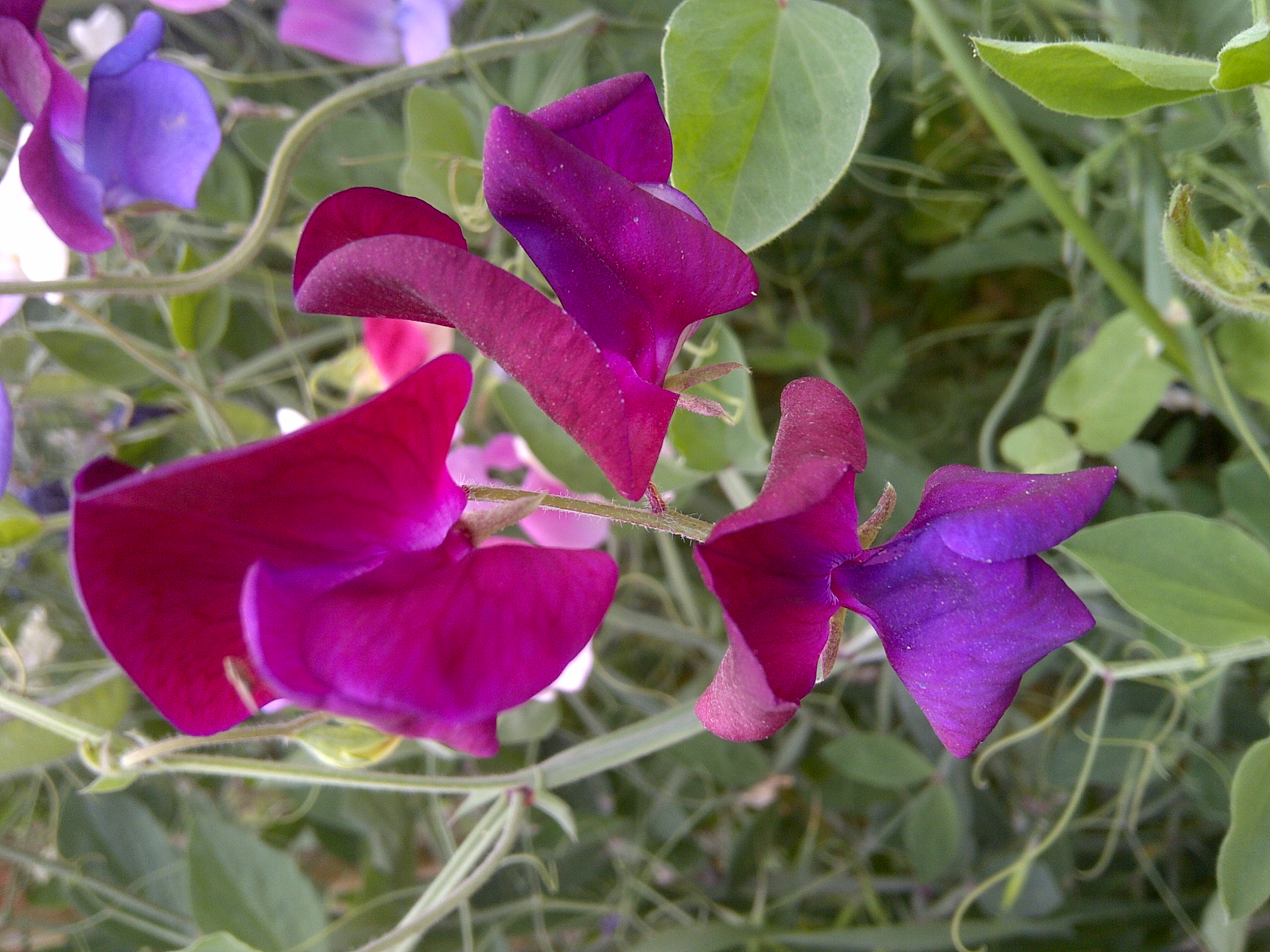

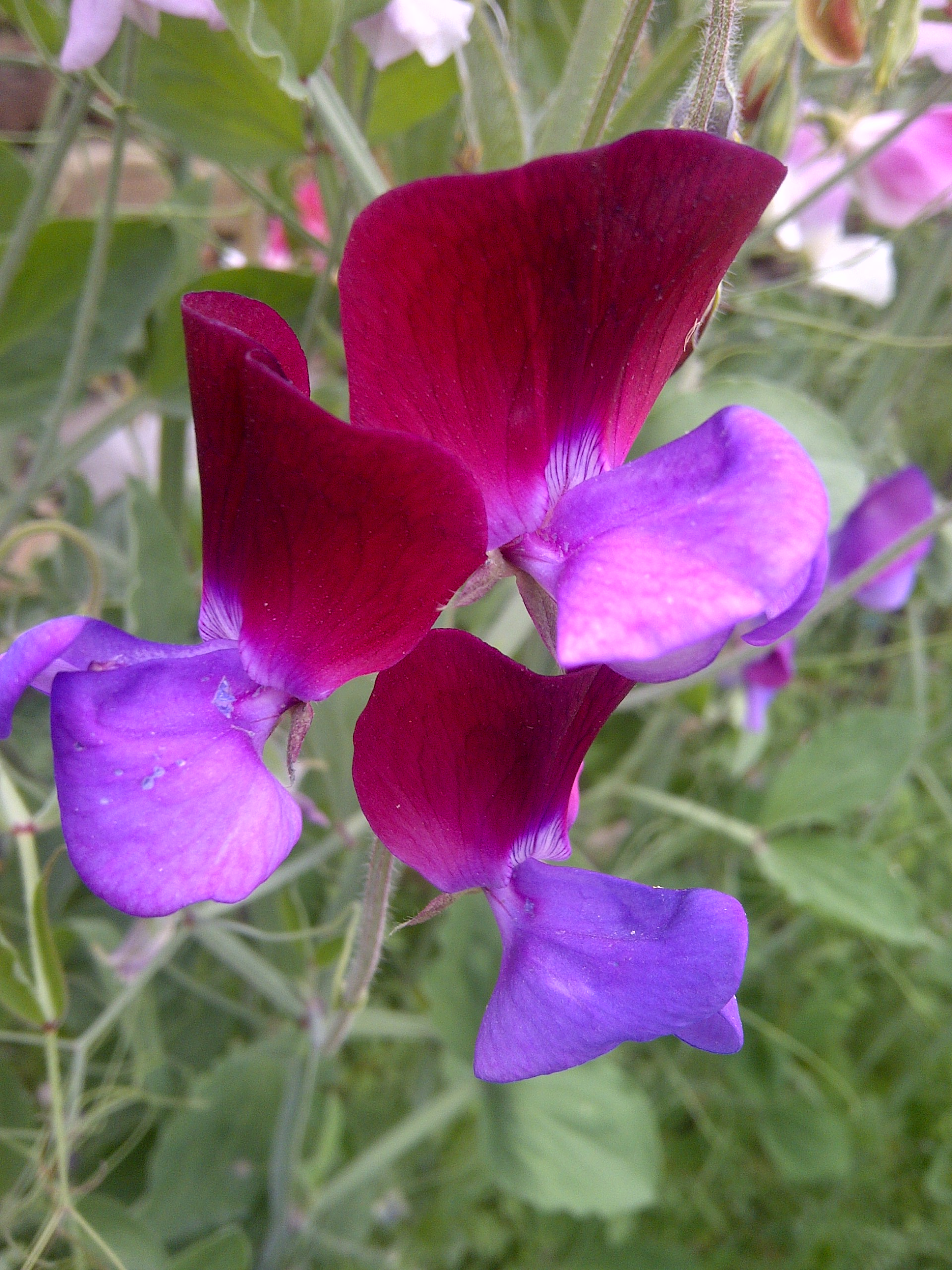

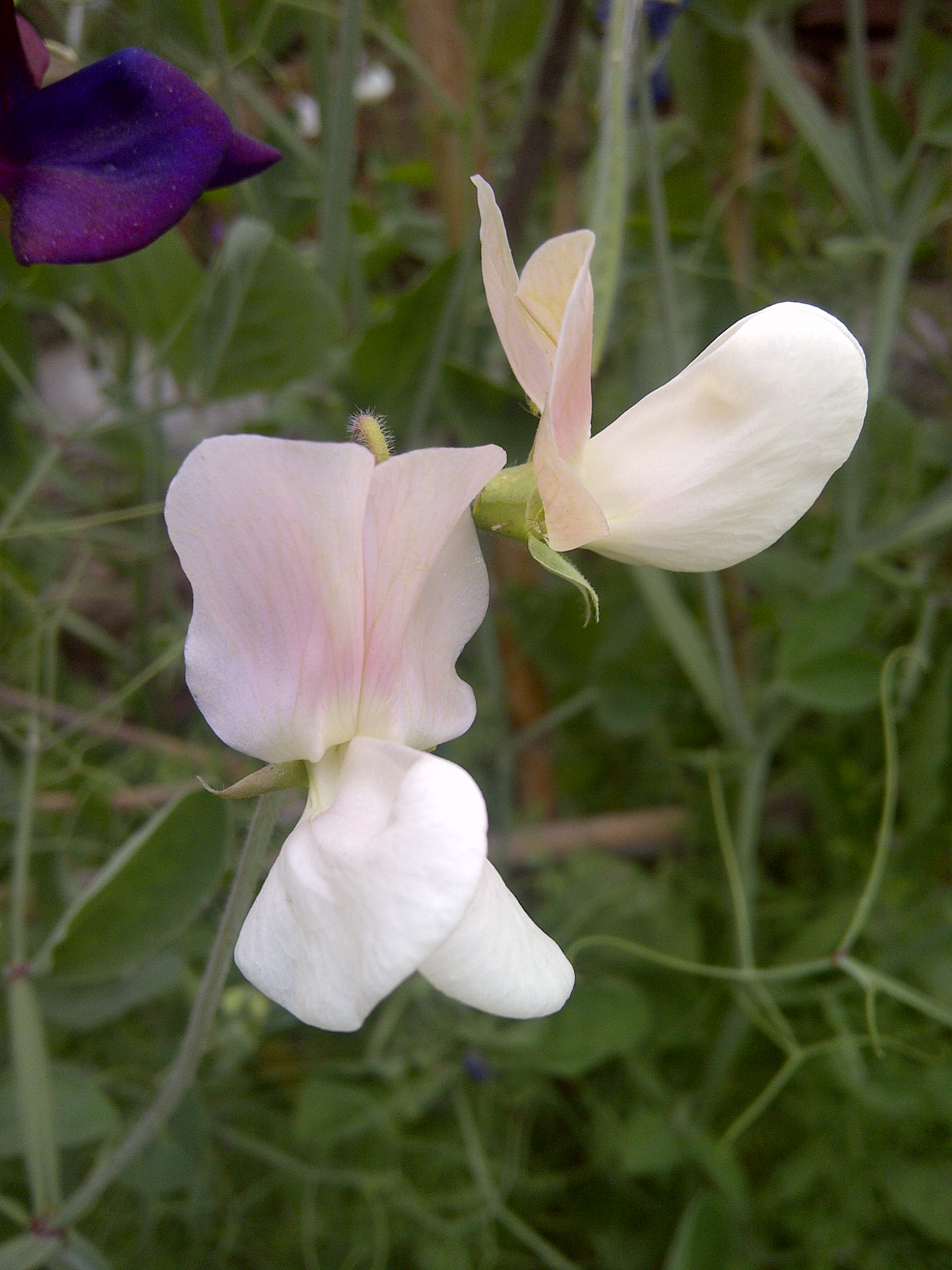

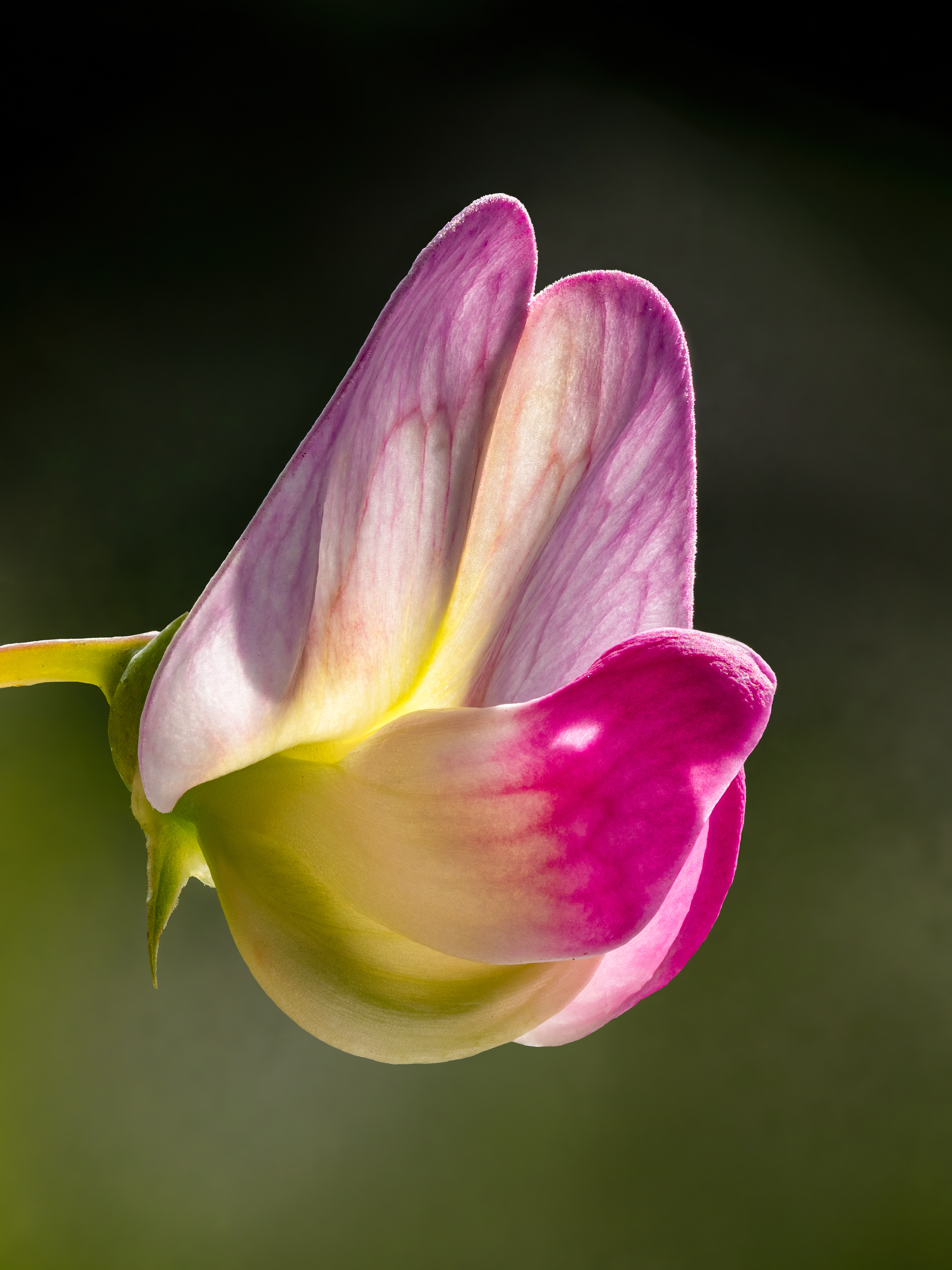
Close up of flower

== See also ==
- List of AGM sweet peas – list of sweet peas that have gained the Royal Horticultural Society's Award of Garden Merit
- Wayne Shorter: "Sweet Pea" (1968) with Miles Davis in the album "Water Babies".
- Booker Ervin: "Sweet Pea" (1968) in the album "The In Between".
