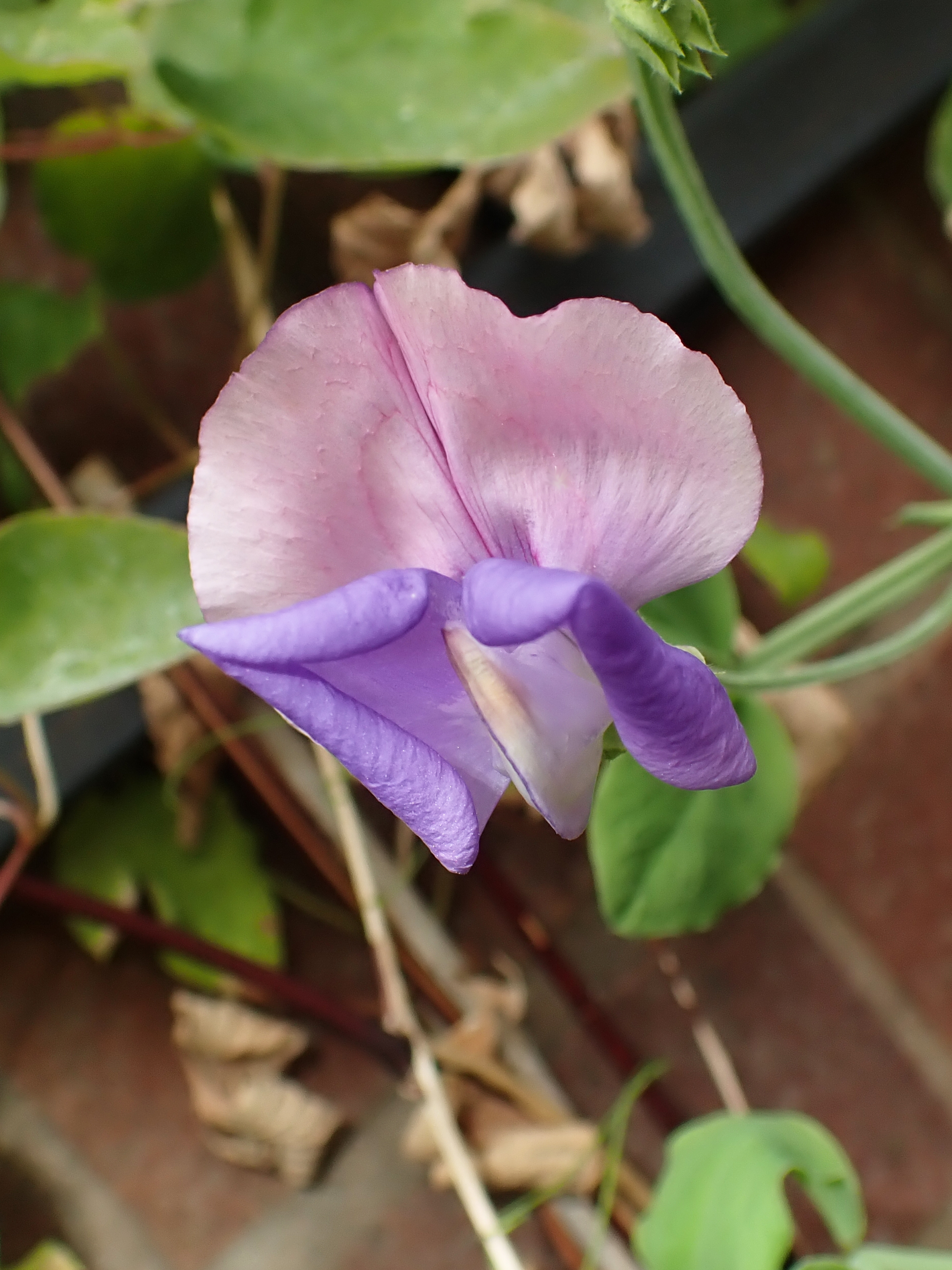
- The flower of the hybrid cultivar 'Erewhon'.

Scientific classification
- Kingdom: Plantae
- Clade: Tracheophytes
- Clade: Angiosperms
- Clade: Eudicots
- Clade: Rosids
- Order: Fabales
- Family: Fabaceae
- Subfamily: Faboideae
- Genus: Lathyrus
- Species: L. × hammettii

Binomial name
- Lathyrus × hammettii Dawn Edwards

= Lathyrus × hammettii =

Species of flowering plant

Lathyrus × hammettii is a hybrid flowering plant within the genus Lathyrus and family Fabaceae. The hybrid was produced by artificially hybridizing L. odoratus with L. belinensis.

== History ==
The hybridization of these two species was first attempted by plant breeder Dr Keith Hammett, using the sweet pea cultivar Lathyrus odoratus 'Orange Dragon', L. belinensis and embryo rescue techniques. The hybrid was attempted in hopes of producing a yellow sweet pea, which plant breeders have been attempting to create for decades. The F1 hybrid offspring produced from the cross were self sterile and possessed pink flowers. Multiple non yellow cultivars of Lathyrus × hammettii have been produced descending from those plants.

== Mildew resistance ==
Lathyrus belinensis possesses genetics that exhibit mildew resistance. L. odoratus is susceptible to mildew. Hybrids produced between the two species were found to be resistant to the fungus Erysiphe pisi, which causes mildew in sweet peas.
