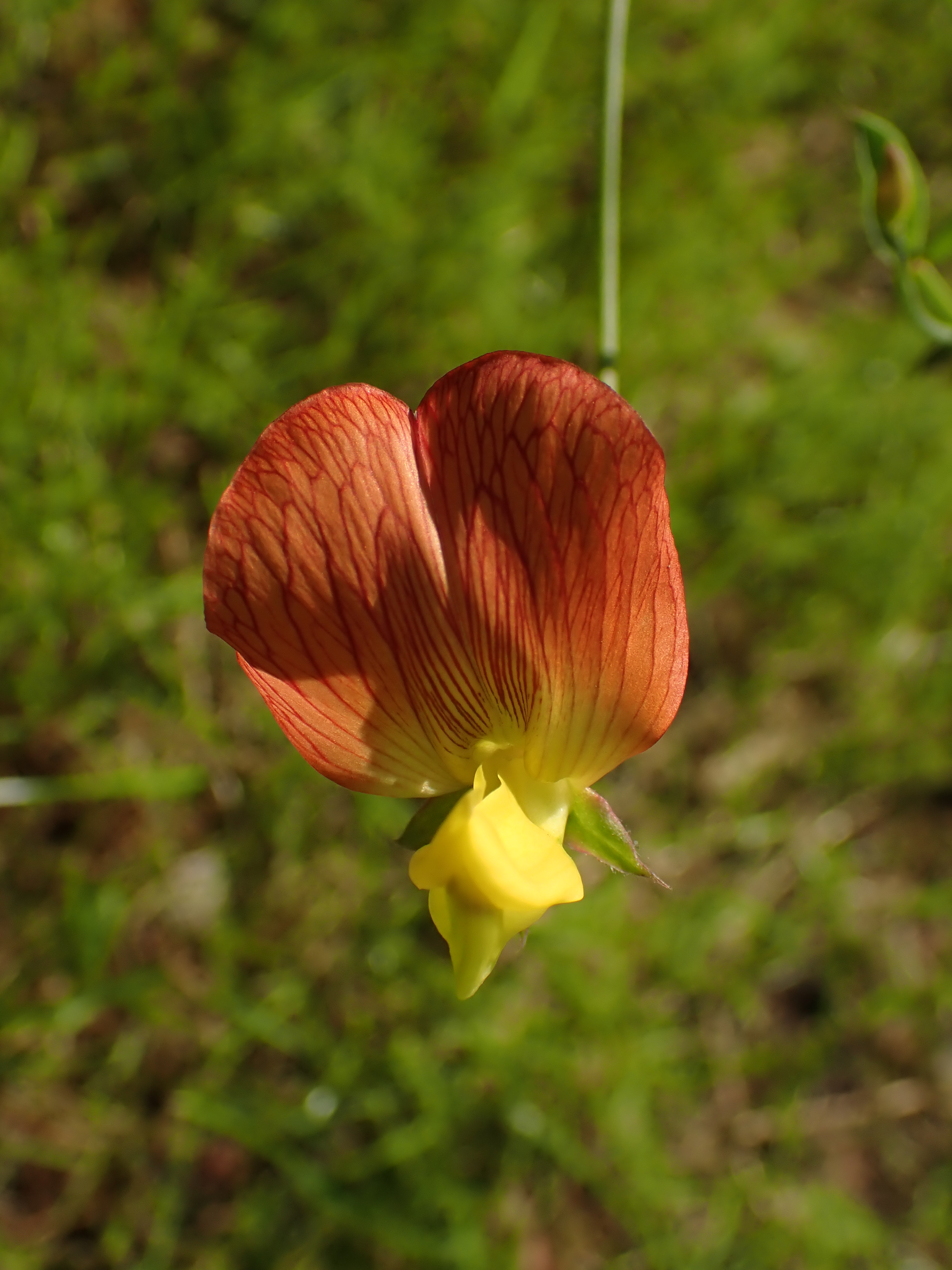

Conservation status
- Critically Endangered (IUCN 3.1)

Scientific classification
- Kingdom: Plantae
- Clade: Embryophytes
- Clade: Tracheophytes
- Clade: Spermatophytes
- Clade: Angiosperms
- Clade: Eudicots
- Clade: Rosids
- Order: Fabales
- Family: Fabaceae
- Subfamily: Faboideae
- Genus: Lathyrus
- Species: L. belinensis

Binomial name
- Lathyrus belinensis N.Maxted & Goyder
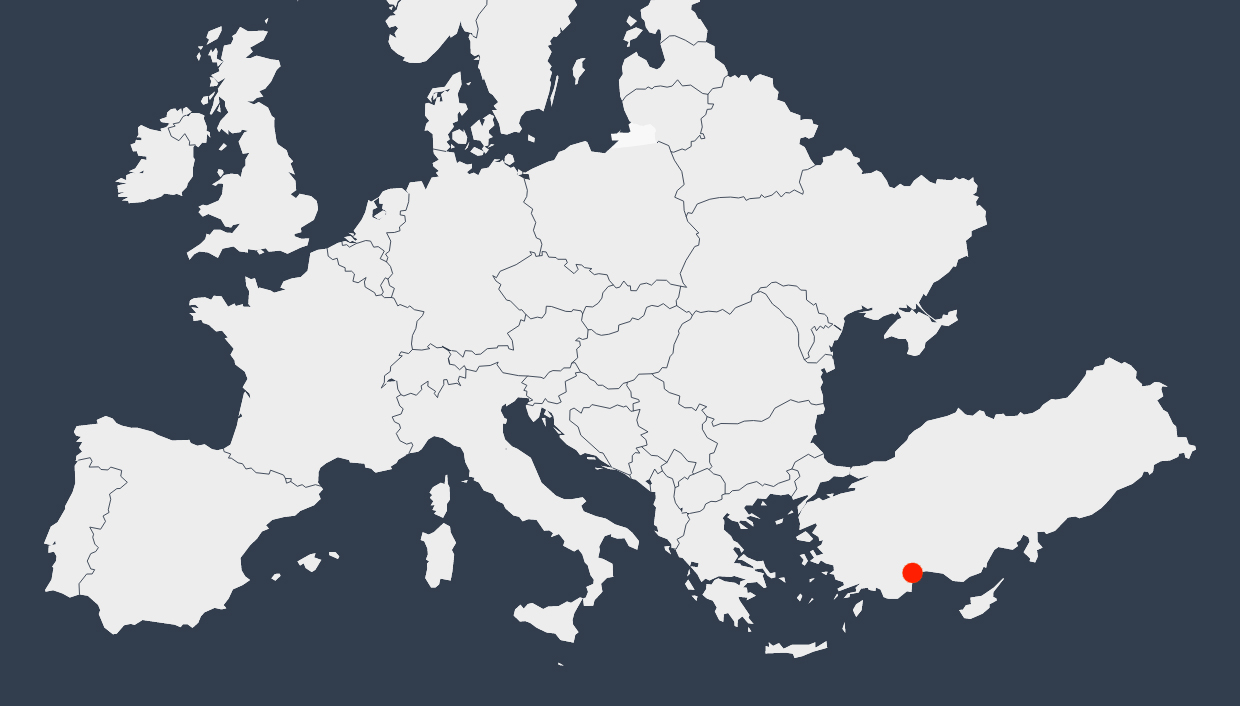
- The range of Lathyrus belinensis.

= Lathyrus belinensis =

Species of legume

Lathyrus belinensis, also known as the Belin pea is a flowering plant species in the genus Lathyrus under the family Fabaceae. The species was discovered in Turkey by botanists Nigel Maxted and David John Goyder and was first described in 1988. The species is a highly localized endemic found only in the Turkish province of Antalya. L. belinensis was listed among the top one hundred most endangered species of the world by the IUCN in 2012.

== Description ==
Lathyrus belinensis is an annual climbing plant. Stems reach heights of 90 cm (35 in) when suitable places to climb are available. The leaves are pinnate with two leaflets and a terminal tendril that curls and intertwines itself to nearby plants and structures, this allows L. belinensis to hook onto things for support. The plant will flower during the summer between the months of June to August and the flowers are strongly scented. Flowers are small, usually around 2.5 cm (0.98 in) or less in width. The flowers are bicoloured possessing a yellow keel and a standard hosting striking orange and red veins.

== Distribution and habitat ==
Lathyrus belinensis is endemic to Turkey, where it is found within the province of Antalya. Their entire wild population is restricted to an area of 2 km^{2} on the outskirts of Belin village. It naturally grows on rocky, limestone hillsides in temperate grassland and shrubland at elevations of 560 metres (1,840 ft) above sea level. It has also been known to grow in manmade habitats such as graveyards, the sides of roads, railway tracks and margins between arable land. It is also occasionally grown outside of its natural range in gardens as a rare ornamental plant.

== Threats ==
Lathyrus belinensis is threatened due it its entire wild population being found in only one area. The land where it was originally found is heavily overgrazed by livestock, which as a result heavily impacts the survival of L. belinensis. A lot of the species original habitat was also destroyed in the process of building a police station. Much of the habitat which remained was planted with conifer trees, which shade out the vegetation below. This prevents L. belinesis from growing on a lot of its original habitat.

== Hybridization with Lathyrus odoratus ==
The sweet pea (Lathyrus odoratus) was introduced into cultivation during the 17th century. Many different coloured cultivars were selectively bred by gardeners with many flower colours ranging from: pink, red, purple, white, orange and blue. One colour which was always desired yet could not be obtained was a solid yellow sweet pea. Selective breeding was not successful in creating a yellow flowering plant. Hybridization was attempted between the sweet pea and various other yellow flowering Lathyrus species. Many attempts failed to create viable offspring and those that were created did not possess yellow flowers. The newly discovered Belin pea (L. belinensis) is morphologically very similar to the sweet pea (L. odoratus) and also possesses yellow pigment in its flower. This made it a good candidate for hybridization.

Hybridization was first attempted by plant breeder Dr Keith Hammett. Hybrids were originally created through embryo rescue techniques. Later on successful healthy hybrids were produced when L. belinensis was crosspollinated with L. odoratus 'Orange Dragon'. The F1 hybrids produced possessed pink flowers and were self-sterile. Breeders are continuing to backcross their lines in hopes of producing a yellow sweet pea.

=== Hybrid cultivars ===
Through the process of hybridization in attempt to create a yellow sweet pea various new colours and cultivars of sweet pea were produced. These cultivars are sometimes referred to under their hybrid species name Lathyrus x hammettii.

Hybrid cultivar examples
Name	Description
'Blue Shift'	Flowers start off mauve in colour, however develop into an intense blue.
'Blue Vein'	Flowers start off apricot in colour, however mature to become pale orange with pronounced dark blue veins.
'Erewhon'	Flowers are reverse bicoloured with lavender standards and mauve wings.
'Painted Porcelain'	Flowers are cream in colour with petals hosting rosy pink edges.
'Porlock'	Flowers are crimson in colour with mauve wings and maroon veins.
'Turquoise Lagoon'	Flowers start off pale pink, however mature to become turquoise in colour.

=== Mildew resistance ===
It was discovered that L. belinensis possesses an allele associated with mildew resistance. L. odoratus however is susceptible to the disease. It was believed that through the process of introgressive hybridization L. odoratus could receive improved disease resistance. Hybridization was later conducted to produce viable hybrids between L. belinensis and L. odoratus. These hybrids proved to be resistant to the fungus Erysiphe pisi, which causes powdery mildew in sweet pea plants.

== Gallery ==
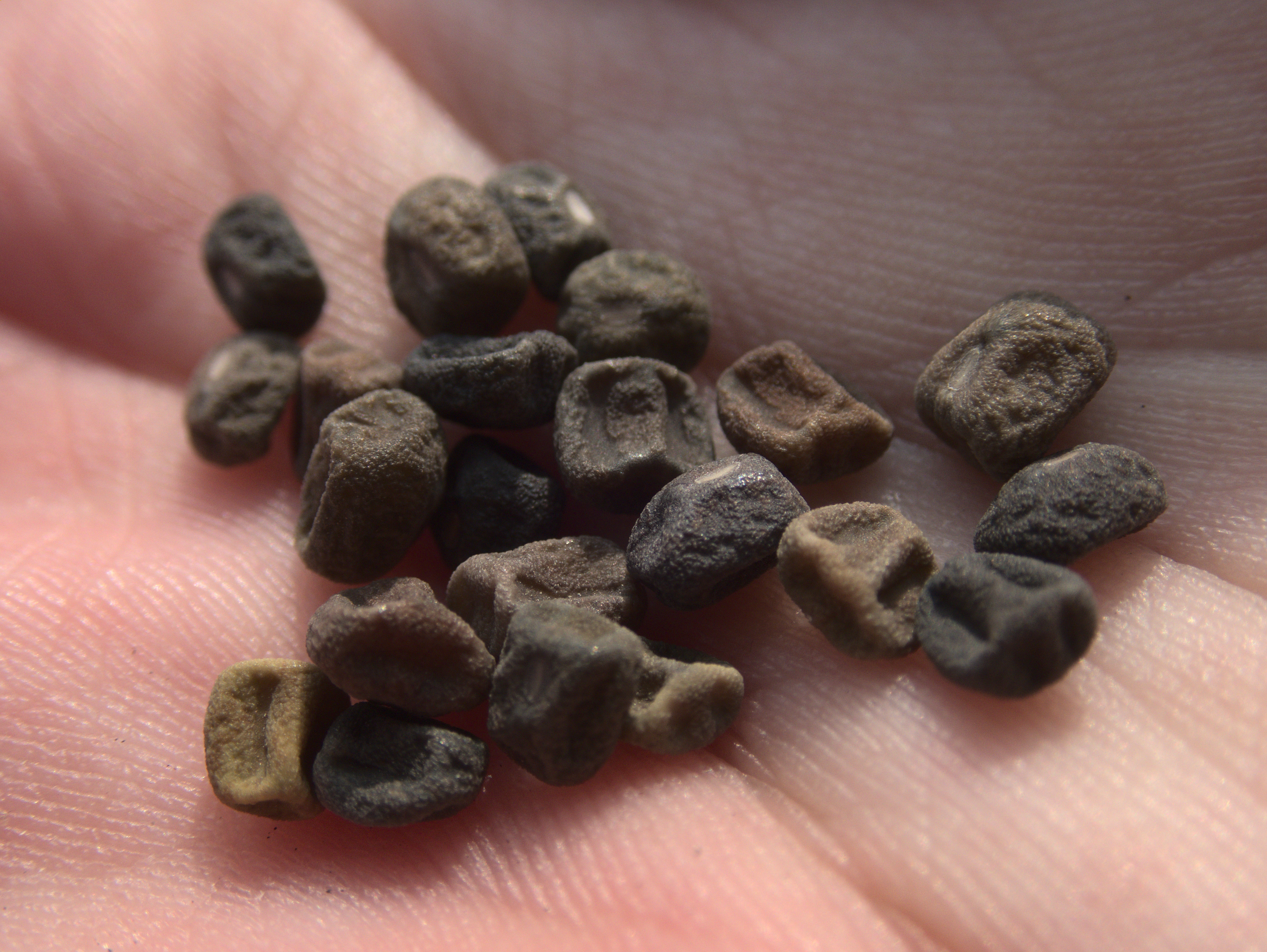
L. belinensis seeds.

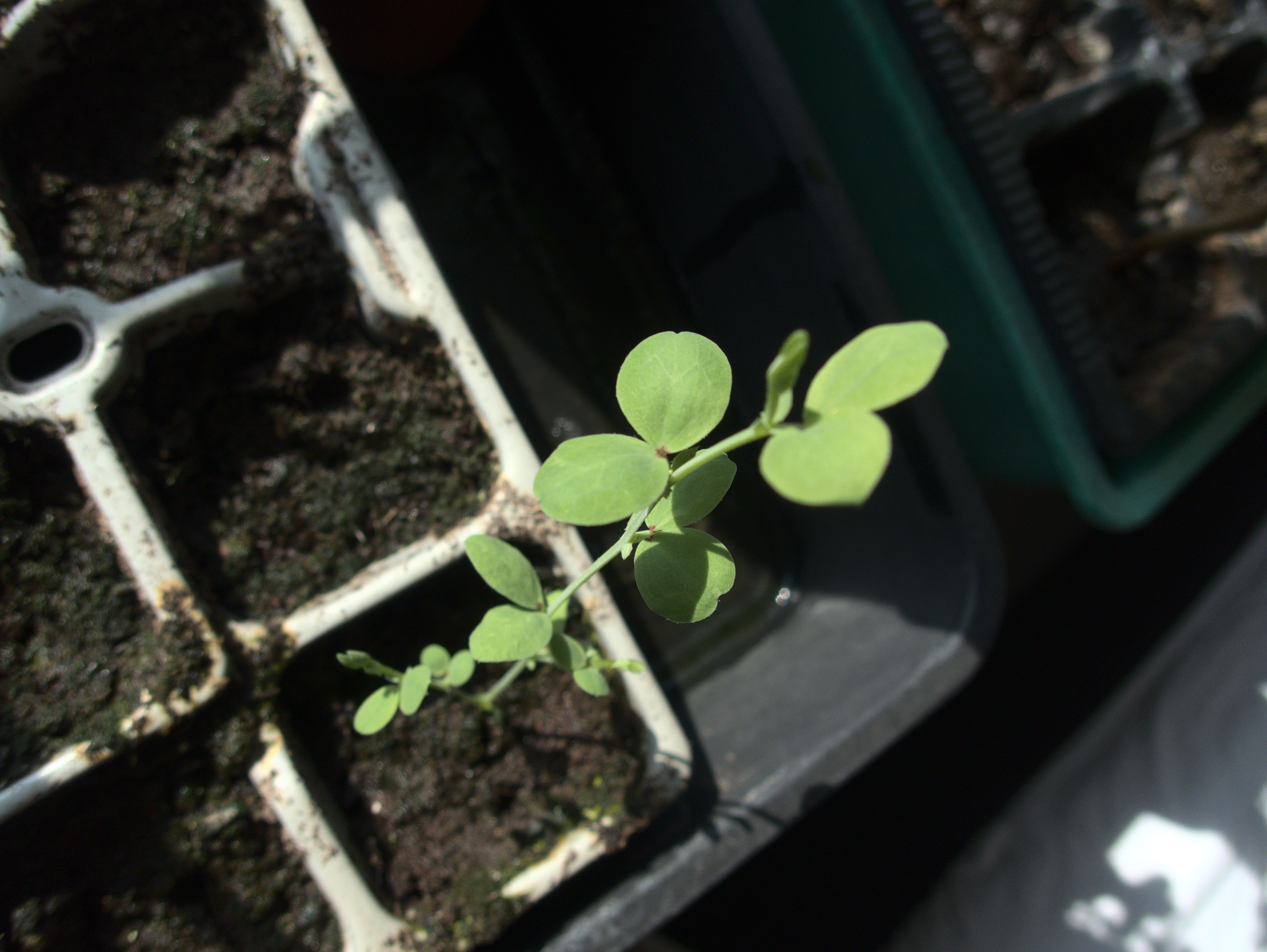
Young L. beinensis plant.

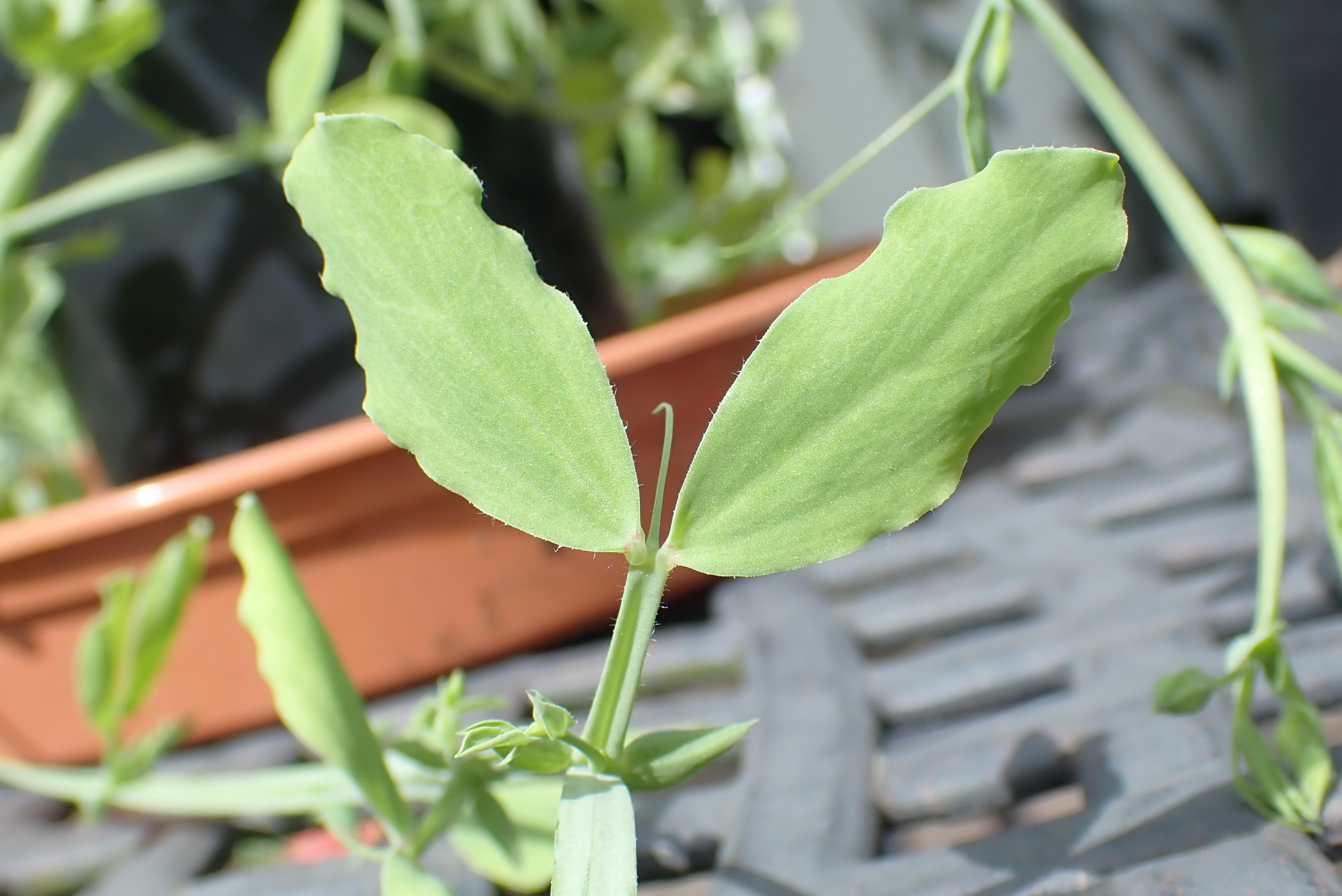
Lathyrus belinensis leaves
