= List of Award of Garden Merit sweet peas =

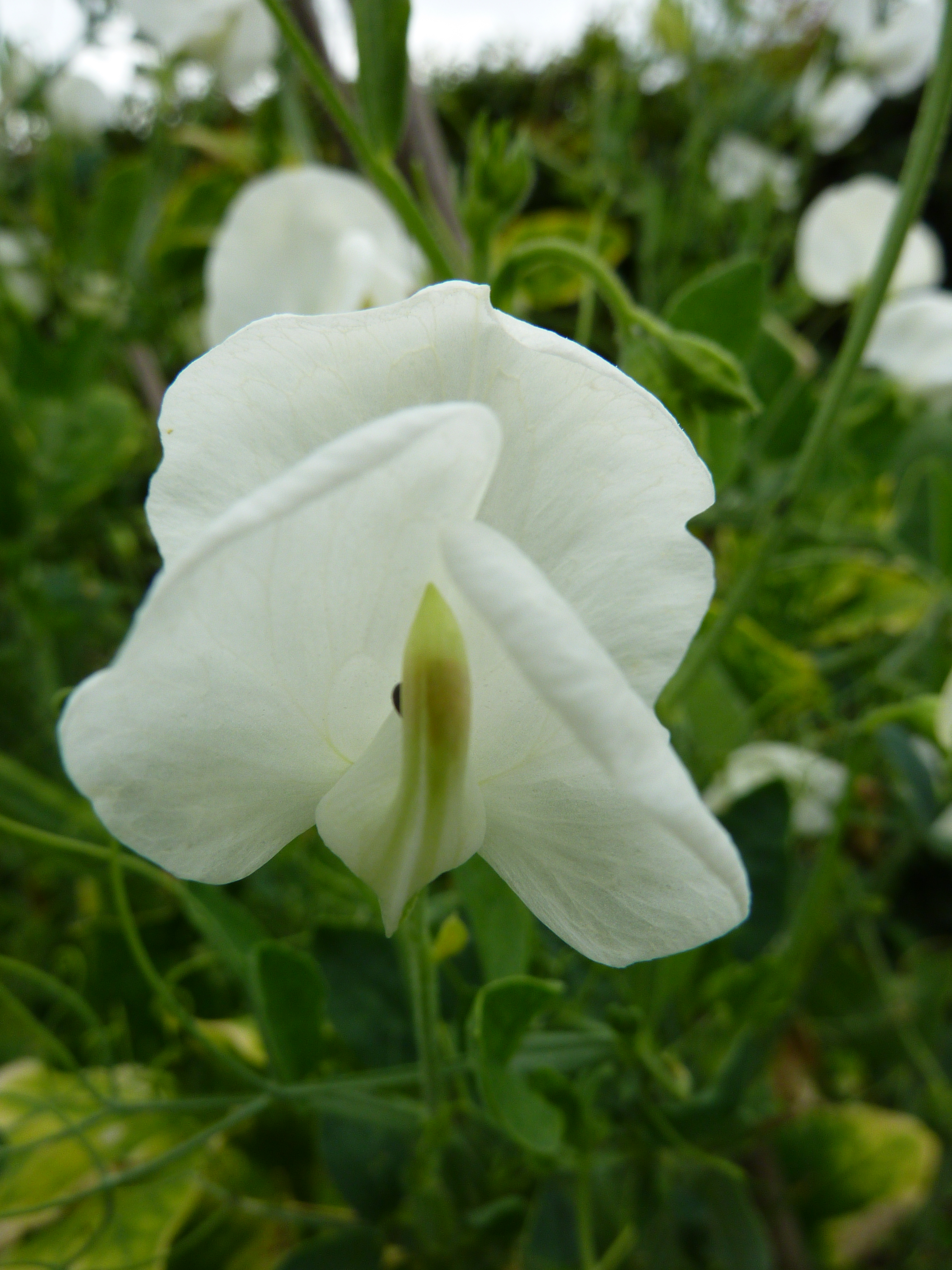
'Dorothy Eckford', a sweet pea cultivar, grown at Cambridge University Botanic Garden

A number of sweet pea (Lathyrus odoratus) cultivars have gained the Royal Horticultural Society's Award of Garden Merit. They are annuals grown as twining climbers, with flowers in pastel shades from white through pink to blue and deep purple. There are several bi-colours. Several cultivars are scented to a greater or lesser degree. Sweet peas can be badly affected by aphids, slugs and snails.

== List ==
Cultivar	Colour	Height	Fragrance	Ref
America	white/purple	1.8 m (5 ft 11 in)	medium	
Aphrodite	white	1.5 m (4 ft 11 in)	strong	
Ballerina Blue	blue (pale)	1.8 m (5 ft 11 in)	strong	
Bobby's Girl	pale salmon pink	1.8 m (5 ft 11 in)	medium	
Bounce Mid Blue	lavender	1.0 m (3 ft 3 in)		
Bounce Navy Blue	blue (deep)	0.6 m (2 ft 0 in)		
Bramdean	white	1.8 m (5 ft 11 in)	strong	
Bristol	pale violet	1.7 m (5 ft 7 in)	strong	
Brook Hall	white	2.0 m (6 ft 7 in)		
Cathy	white	2.0 m (6 ft 7 in)	medium	
Charlie's Angel	violet (pale)	2.0 m (6 ft 7 in)	strong	
Chris Harrod	blue (pale)	2.0 m (6 ft 7 in)		
Crimson Cherub	red	0.4 m (1 ft 4 in)	medium	
Dorothy Eckford	white	1.9 m (6 ft 3 in)	medium	
Duo Salmon	red/pink	2.1 m (6 ft 11 in)	strong	-
Evening Glow	pale pink	1.7 m (5 ft 7 in)	slight	
First Flame	salmon	2.0 m (6 ft 7 in)		
Flora Norton	blue	1.5 m (4 ft 11 in)	medium	
Gwendoline	pale pink	2.0 m (6 ft 7 in)	medium	
Hannah's Harmony	white/red	1.1 m (3 ft 7 in)	slight	
Heathcliff	blue (violet)	2.5 m (8 ft 2 in)	strong	
High Scent	white/violet	1.8 m (5 ft 11 in)	strong	
Jacqueline Heather	white/pale pink	2.5 m (8 ft 2 in)		
Janet Scott	pale pink	1.8 m (5 ft 11 in)	strong	
Jilly	white	2.2 m (7 ft 3 in)	medium	
John Gray	white/pale pink	2.5 m (8 ft 2 in)	medium	
Just Julia	blue (mid)	2.5 m (8 ft 2 in)	strong	
King Edward VII	crimson	1.5 m (4 ft 11 in)	medium	
Lady T. Cherub	pink/red	1.5 m (4 ft 11 in)	medium	
Lauren Landy	cream/pink	2.5 m (8 ft 2 in)	medium	
Lavender Sprite	pink (lilac)	0.25 m (9.8 in)	medium	
Lipstick	pink (magenta)	2.2 m (7 ft 3 in)	strong	
Madison	pink/red	2.0 m (6 ft 7 in)	strong	
Margaret Joyce	violet	1.9 m (6 ft 3 in)	strong	
Martha Mary	white	2.0 m (6 ft 7 in)	medium	
Mary Mac	cream	2.0 m (6 ft 7 in)		
Matucana	violet/crimson	2.0 m (6 ft 7 in)	strong	
Mrs Bernard Jones	pink/white	2.3 m (7 ft 7 in)	strong	
Noel Sutton	violet blue	2.2 m (7 ft 3 in)	medium	
Northern Lights Cherub	pink/blue	0.5 m (1 ft 8 in)		
Oklahoma	white/crimson	1.8 m (5 ft 11 in)	strong	
Pandemonium	white/pink	2.5 m (8 ft 2 in)		
Patricia Anne	white/violet	1.8 m (5 ft 11 in)	medium	
Pocahontas	white/pink	2.5 m (8 ft 2 in)	medium	
Sicilian Pink	cerise/white/purple	1.8 m (5 ft 11 in)	strong	
Solway Sapphire	blue/white	1.3 m (4 ft 3 in)	slight	
Solway Snowflake	white/pink	1.0 m (3 ft 3 in)		
Somerset Lady	pink (magenta)	2.5 m (8 ft 2 in)		
Starlight	magenta	2.5 m (8 ft 2 in)	medium	
Sunset	white/pink	2.0 m (6 ft 7 in)	strong	
Tahiti Sunrise	white/coral	1.7 m (5 ft 7 in)	strong	
Teresa Maureen	white/purple	0.9 m (2 ft 11 in)	medium	
Tranquillity	red	2.0 m (6 ft 7 in)		
Valerie Harrod	white/pink	2.1 m (6 ft 11 in)	medium	
Wedding Day	white	2.1 m (6 ft 11 in)	strong	
White Supreme	white	2.3 m (7 ft 7 in)	strong	
Wretham Pink	pink (pale)	1.8 m (5 ft 11 in)	strong	
