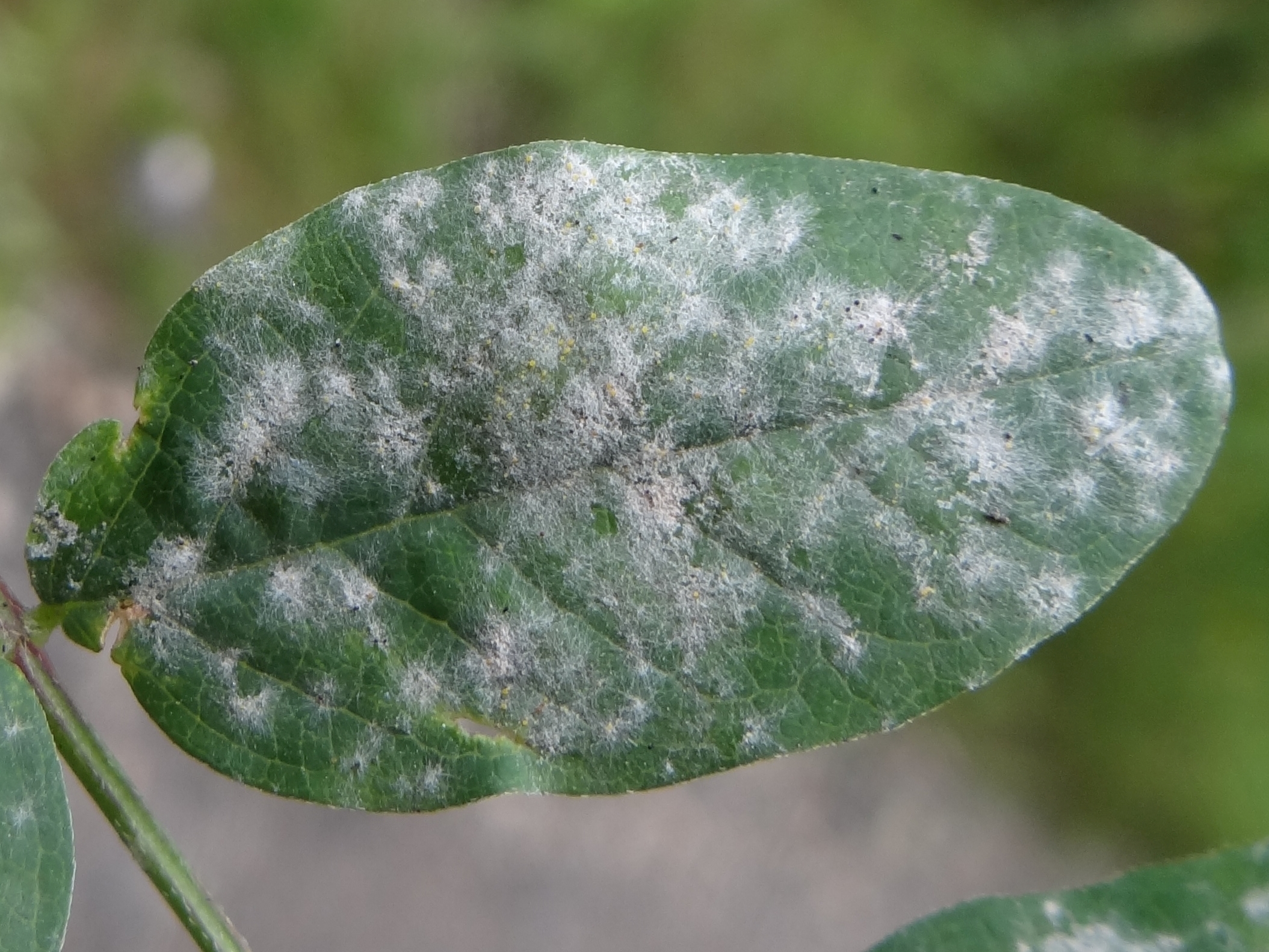

Scientific classification
- Kingdom: Fungi
- Division: Ascomycota
- Class: Leotiomycetes
- Order: Helotiales
- Family: Erysiphaceae
- Genus: Erysiphe
- Species: E. pisi

Binomial name
- Erysiphe pisi DC., (1821)

Synonyms
- Alphitomorpha pisi Erysiphe communis f. hosackiae Erysiphe communis f. phaseoli Erysiphe communis f. pisi Erysiphe communis f.sp. medicaginis-lupulinae Erysiphe communis f.sp. medicaginis-sativae Erysiphe macropus Erysiphe martii Erysiphe pisi Erysiphe pisi f.sp. medicaginis-lupulinae Erysiphe pisi f.sp. medicaginis-sativae Erysiphe pisi f.sp. pisi Erysiphe pisi f.sp. viciae-sativae Ischnochaeta pisi

= Erysiphe pisi =

Species of fungus

Erysiphe pisi is a plant pathogen that causes powdery mildew on several plant species.

== Distribution and habitat ==
Erysiphe pisi has an almost circumglobal distribution and can be found across much of the world where it infects a large variety of host plants many within the family Fabaceae. The powdery mildew caused by this species is most prevalent within regions that experience dry climates, with hot days and cool nights.
